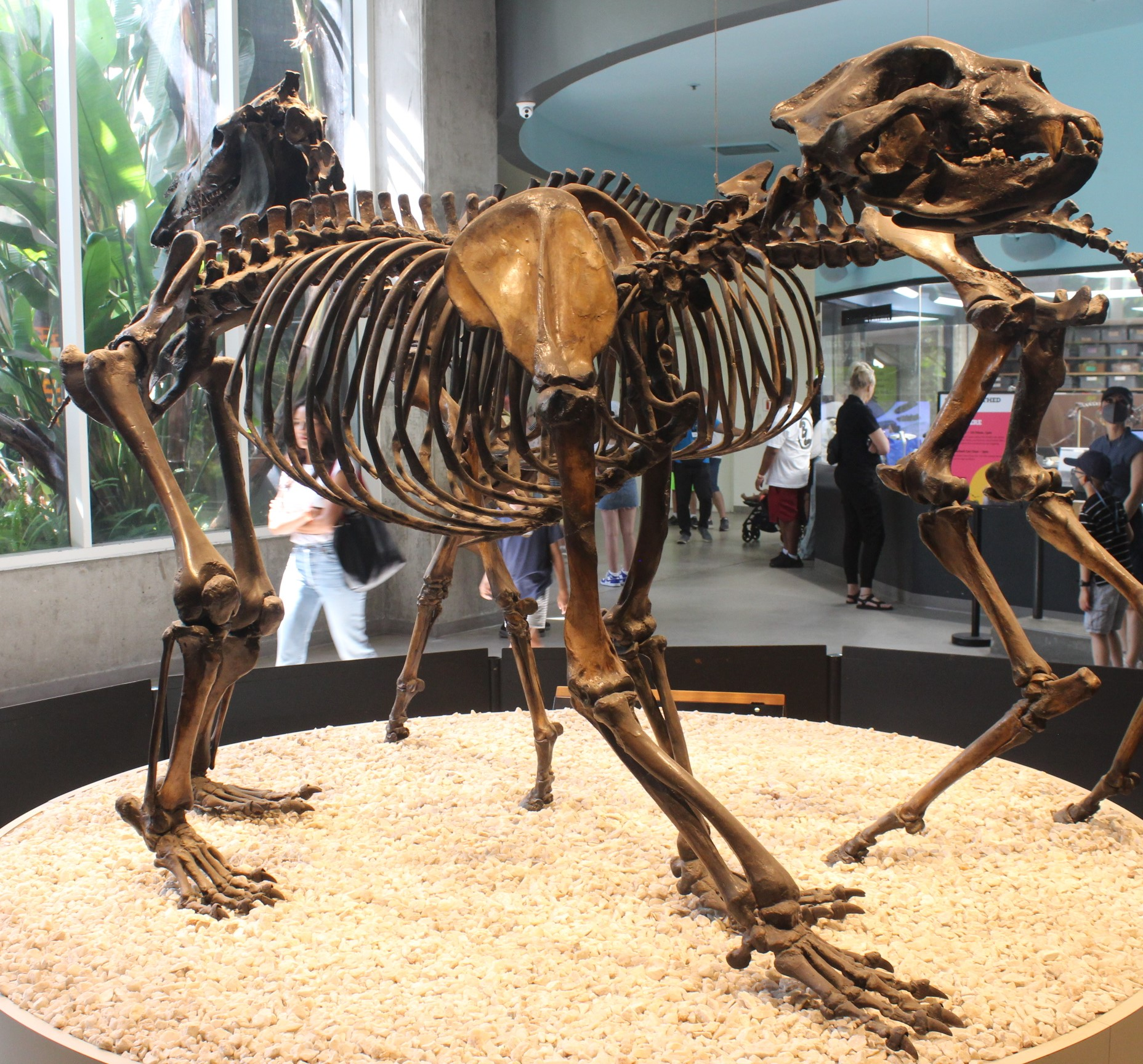
- A. simus from the La Brea Tar Pits

Scientific classification
- Kingdom: Animalia
- Phylum: Chordata
- Class: Mammalia
- Order: Carnivora
- Family: Ursidae
- Subfamily: Tremarctinae
- Genus: †Arctodus; Leidy, 1854

Type species
- †Arctodus pristinus Leidy, 1854

Other species
- †A. simus (Cope, 1879)
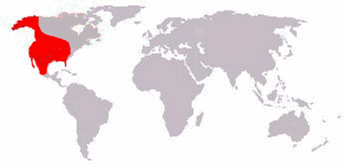
- Arctodus simus range

Synonyms
- synonyms of A. pristinus: Arctodus haplodon Hay 1902; Arctotherium pristinum Cope 1895; Ursus haplodon Cope 1896; Tremarctos haplodon Trouessart 1897; synonyms of A. simus: Arctodus nebrascensis Berger 1930; Arctotherium californicum Merriam 1911; Arctotherium simum Cope 1879; Arctotherium yukonense Lambe 1911; Dinarctotherium merriami Barbour 1916; Tremarctotherium californicum Rinker 1949; Tremarctotherium simum Gidley 1928; Tremarctotherium simus Hibbard 1955

= Arctodus =

Arctodus Temporal range: 2.58–0.0128 Ma Blancan - Rancholabrean

Extinct genus of bears

Arctodus is an extinct genus of short-faced bears that inhabited North America during the Pleistocene (about 2.58 Mya until 12,800 years ago). The two recognized species are the lesser short-faced bear (Arctodus pristinus) and the giant short-faced bear (Arctodus simus). Of these species, A. simus was larger, is known from more complete remains, and is considered one of the best-known members of North America's extinct Ice Age megafauna. A. pristinus was largely restricted to the Early Pleistocene of the eastern United States, whereas A. simus had a broader range, with most finds being from the Late Pleistocene of the United States, Mexico and Canada. A. simus evolved from A. pristinus, but both species likely overlapped in the Middle Pleistocene. Both species are relatively rare in the fossil record.

Today considered to be an enormous omnivore, Arctodus simus is believed to be one of the largest known terrestrial carnivorans that has ever existed. Arctodus, like other bears, was highly sexually dimorphic. Adult A. simus ranged between 300 and 950 kilograms (660 and 2,090 lb), with females clustering at ≤500 kg (1,100 lb), and males around 800 kg (1,800 lb). The largest males stood at 1.67 m (5 ft 5.7 in) at the shoulder, and up to 3.4 m (11 ft) tall on their rear legs. Studies suggest that A. simus browsed on C_{3} vegetation and consumed browsing herbivores such as deer, camelids, and tapir. The species preferred temperate open woodlands, but was adaptable, taking advantage of many habitats and feeding opportunities.

Arctodus belongs to the Tremarctinae subfamily of bears, which are endemic to the Americas. Of these short-faced bears, Arctodus was the most widespread in North America, and was present in the Blancan, Irvingtonian and Rancholabrean faunal stages. A. pristinus went extinct around 300,000 years ago, with A. simus disappearing about 12,800 years ago in the Late Pleistocene extinctions. The cause behind these extinctions is unclear, but in the case of A. pristinus, was likely due to climate change and competition with other ursids, such as the black bear and Tremarctos floridanus. A. simus likely went extinct due to ecological collapse disrupting the vegetation and prey on which it relied.

== Taxonomy ==
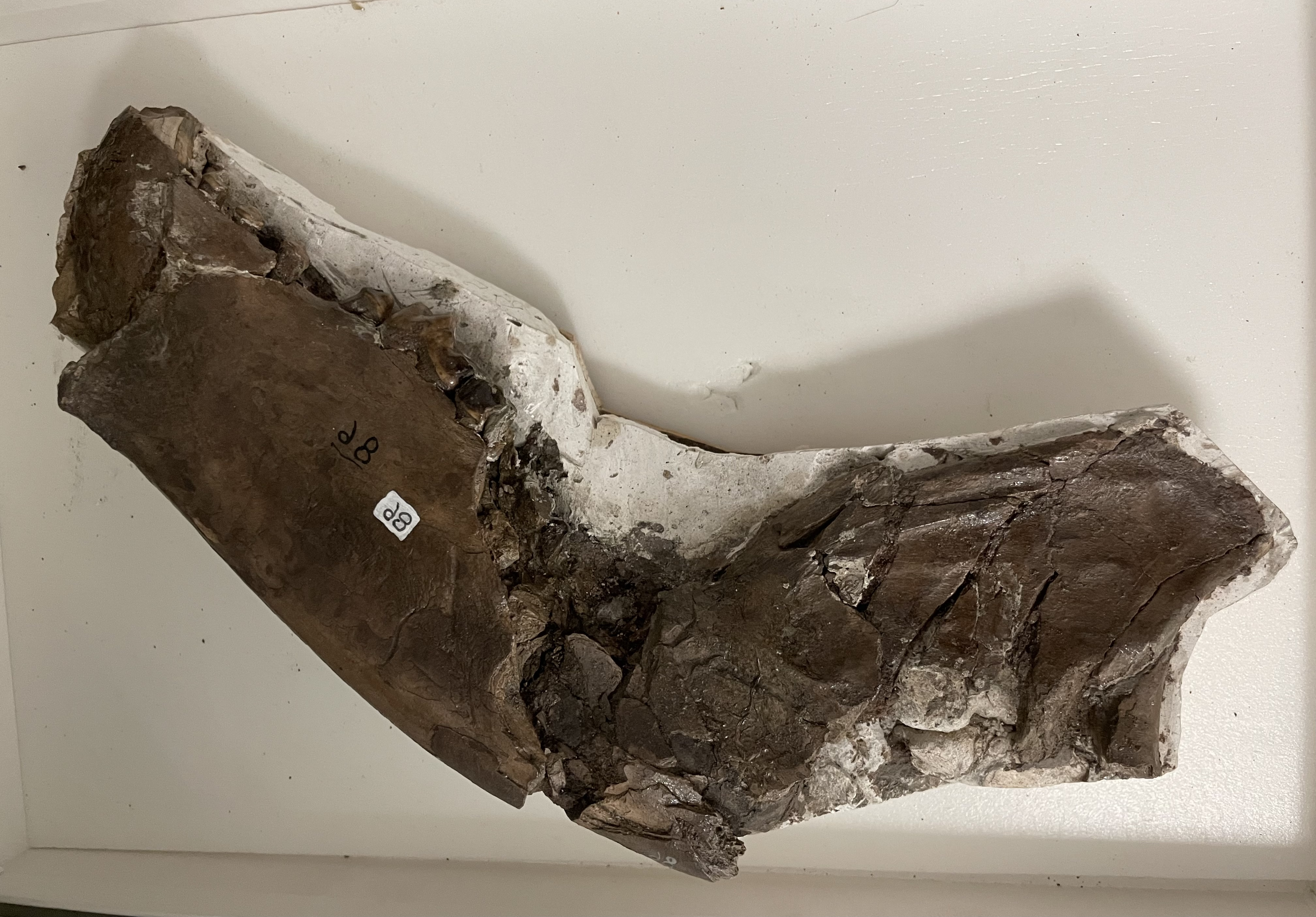
Partial mandible of A. pristinus uncovered from Port Kennedy Cave

Arctodus was first described by Joseph Leidy in 1854, with finds of A. pristinus from the Ashley Phosphate Beds, Charleston County, South Carolina. The scientific name of the genus, Arctodus, derives from Greek, and means "bear tooth". The first fossils of A. simus were found in the Potter Creek Cave, Shasta County, California, by J. A. Richardson in 1878, and were initially described as Arctotherium simum by Edward Drinker Cope in 1879. Historically, all specimens were grouped together under A. pristinus until a revision by Björn Kurtén in 1967. The (lost) holotype and neotype of A. pristinus are both from South Carolina, with the specimen from Potter Creek Cave now considered the holotype for A. simus.

In the 19th and early 20th centuries, specimens of Arctodus were occasionally referred to Arctotherium, and vice versa. However, Arctodus and Arctotherium did not overlap biogeographically, with the southernmost specimens of Arctodus being from the Trans-Mexican Volcanic Belt, and the northernmost records of Arctotherium (A. wingei) being from the Yucatán Peninsula. Other early researchers believed Arctodus to be a sister lineage of the agriotheriin Indarctos. Sometimes described as the "American cave bear", Arctodus should not be mistaken for the similarly large Eurasian cave bear (Ursus spelaeus). As an ursine, the Eurasian cave bear last shared a common ancestor with the tremarctine Arctodus circa 13.4 Mya.

Fossils of Arctodus pristinus can be confused with the similarly sized, partially contemporaneous short-faced bear, Tremarctos floridanus. Arctodus has higher crowned and considerably larger teeth than its relative Tremarctos. A. pristinus can be distinguished by broader and taller molars on average, but as they are often worn, differentiation can be difficult. Moreover, diagnosing isolated A. simus remains (such as femora, scapulae, certain vertebrae, ribs, podials) from brown bears can be challenging, as some large brown bears overlap in dimensions with small A. simus specimens. Beyond standard differences between tremarctine and ursine bears, A. simus has a more anterior protocone and extended enamel ridge forming a shearing blade on the maxillary P4. The molars are also shorter and broader in Arctodus than brown bears.

=== Evolution ===
Tremarctinae within Ursidae

- †Hemicyoninae
- - †Ursavinae
  - - Ailuropodinae
    - - Ursinae
      - - Tremarctinae (short-faced bears)
          - †Plionarctos
          - - †Arctodus
            - - Tremarctos
              - †Arctotherium

Arctodus belongs to the subfamily Tremarctinae, which appeared in North America during the late Miocene epoch in the form of Plionarctos. The medium-sized Arctodus pristinus, Tremarctos floridanus, and Arctotherium species evolved from Plionarctos in the Blancan faunal stage of North America. The genetic divergence date for Arctodus is between 5.5 million and 4.8 million years ago, around the Miocene-Pliocene boundary, when tremarctine bears, along with other ursids, experienced an explosive radiation in diversity, as C_{4} vegetation (grasses) and open habitats dominated. The world experienced a major temperature drop and increased seasonality, and a faunal turnover, which extinguished 70–80% of North American genera.

Arctodus first appears in the early Late Blancan faunal stage (Gelasian), with the earliest finds being A. pristinus from the Kissimmee River 6 and Santa Fe River 1 sites in Florida, dated from 2.6 to 2.3 Mya, and Arctodus sp. from 111 Ranch (~2.6 Mya) and San Simon (about 2.2 Mya) in Arizona, and La Union in New Mexico (Mesilla Fauna B, 2.2-1.8 Mya). This appearance coincides with the start of the Quaternary glaciation, and the second phase of the great American biotic interchange, with the first records of the main South American faunal wave into the United States. A. pristinus was mostly restricted to the more densely forested thermal enclave in eastern North America. with the greatest concentration of fossils being in Florida.

During the early Irvingtonian faunal stage (1.9 Mya to 850,000 BP), a western population of A. pristinus evolved into the enormous A. simus. Early Irvingtonian sites mostly come from California, being from Elsinore, the Irvington type locality, and possibly El Casco, with additional footprints from Oregon. However, anomalous records from the late Blancan faunal stage of southern California hail from Anza-Borrego (Palm Spring Formation, ~2Mya), and possibly Murrieta and Victorville. Correspondingly, A. simus is most plentiful from western North America, albeit preferring mixed habitat such as temperate open woodlands.

Irvingtonian age specimens of A. simus are particularly sparse, with additional later Irvingtonian remains being from California, Kansas, Nebraska, Montana and Texas, and potentially Irvingtonian trace fossils from Missouri. However, A. simus became a pancontinental species in the proceeding Rancholabrean faunal stage (190,000 BP - 12,000 BP), sharing that distinction with the American black bear. Despite A. simus' large temporal and geographic range, fossil remains are comparatively rare (109 finds as of 2010, in otherwise well-sampled localities).

Although both Arctodus species certainly co-inhabited North America during the Middle Pleistocene (A. pristinus became extinct about 300,000 BP), no robust evidence of overlap or competition has been recovered, with both species appearing to establish largely separate ranges. However, anomalous Late Pleistocene records of A. pristinus suggest co-existence in the Trans-Mexican Volcanic Belt of Mexico. In the United States, their ranges may have met in the Middle Pleistocene of Kansas, with A. simus migrating east in the Late Pleistocene (around the extinction of A. pristinus).

The mitochondrial genome of Tremarctos ornatus (the modern spectacled bear) is more closely Arctotherium than Arctodus. However, a preliminary investigation of the nuclear DNA of short faced bears suggests either an extensive history of hybridization between Arctodus and Tremarctos in North America, or hybridization between Tremarctos and Arctotherium (likely A. wingei) in either Central America or South America. Regardless, no evidence of hybridization between Arctodus and ursine bears was found despite an overlap with black bears and brown bears in Pleistocene North America.

== Description ==
=== Size ===
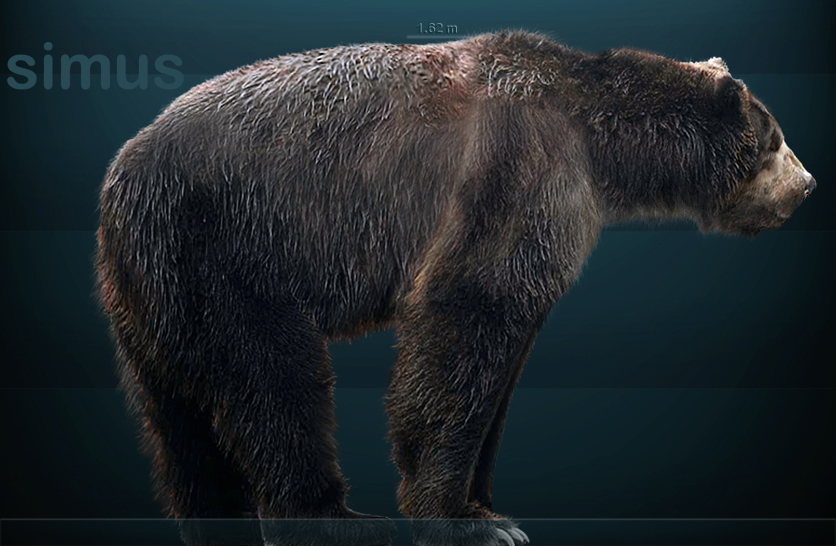
Restoration of A. simus

==== Arctodus pristinus ====
Around the size of grizzly bears, A. pristinus specimens closely overlap the size of Tremarctos floridanus, with some males of A. pristinus overlapping in size with the females of A. simus. Floridan A. pristinus individuals were calculated to an average around 140 kg (310 lb). The dimensions of some individuals from Port Kennedy Bone Cave and Aguascalientes, though, suggest that northern and western A. pristinus populations may have been larger than Floridan A. pristinus, being up to 400 kg (880 lb).

==== Arctodus simus ====
Some A. simus individuals might have been the largest land-dwelling specimens of Carnivora that ever lived in North America. Standing up on its hind legs, A. simus stood 2.4–3.4 m (8–11 ft), with a maximum vertical arm reach of 4.3 m (14.1 ft). When walking on all fours, A. simus stood 1–1.67 m (3.3–5.5 ft) high at the shoulder, with the largest males being tall enough to look an adult human in the eye. The average weight of A. simus was about 625 kg (1,378 lb), with the maximum recorded at 957 kg (2,110 lb).

==== Sexual dimorphism ====
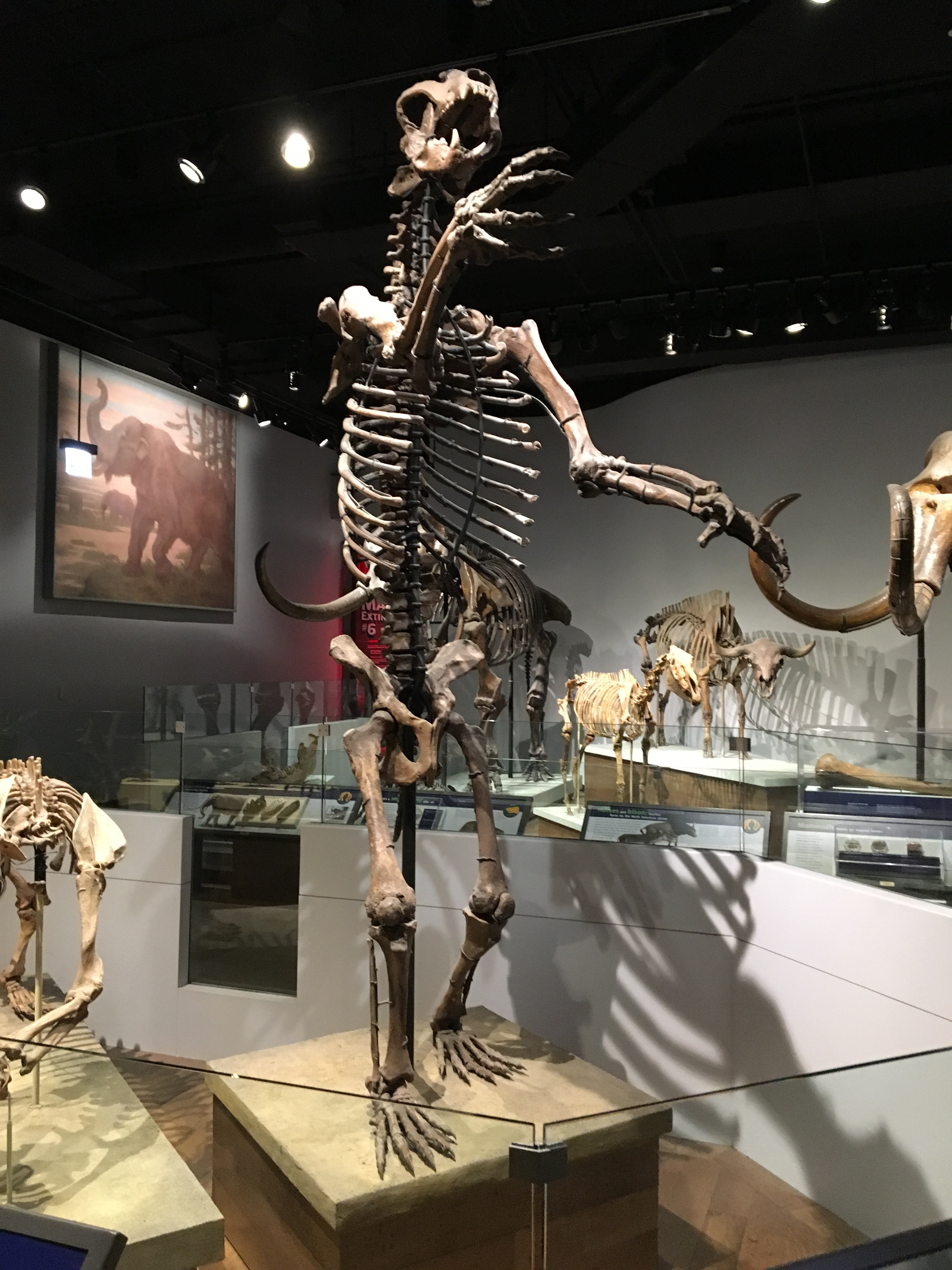
A. simus skeletal at the Field Museum of Natural History, Chicago

Arctodus has been described as very sexually dimorphic; A. simus males were sometimes twice as large as females. Akin to its relative, the spectacled bear (with male spectacled bears being 30-40% larger than females), the larger, massive Arctodus individuals are considered male, particularly older males, with the smaller, more lightly built individuals being females. As with T. ornatus, specimens with a large sagittal crest were likely male, whereas females had a reduced or no sagittal crests. A 2025 mitochondrial DNA study affirmed sexual dimorphism in A. simus, with sexually dimorphic size classes and a uniform population being described from at least 31 individuals recovered from 28 sites across the United States and Canada.

===== Studies =====
In a 2010 study, the mass of six A. simus specimens was estimated; half of the specimens weighed between 740 and 957 kg (1,631 and 2,110 lb), with a mean weight around 850 kg, suggesting larger (male) specimens were probably more common than previously thought. The other (female) specimens were calculated to be less than 500 kg (1,100 lb). The weight range calculated from all examined specimens was between 957 kg and 317 kg (699 lb). A 1999 study by Per Christiansen calculated a mean weight of 770 kilograms (1,700 lb) from seven male A. simus limb bones, suggesting large males weighed between 700 and 800 kg (1,500 and 1,800 lb). Hypothetically, the largest A. simus males may have approached 1,000 kg (2,200 lb), or even 1,200 kg (2,600 lb). However, a 2006 study argued that the maximum size of Arctodus was roughly 555 kg (1,224 lb), based on the largest known skull.

=== Anatomy ===
The two species of Arctodus are differentiated not only by size, but also by the shorter snout, greater prognathism, more robust teeth, and longer limbs of A. simus, and the relative proportions of each species' molars and premolars. A. pristinus is distinguished from A. simus by smaller, narrower, and less crowded teeth. The morphologies of both species are otherwise very similar. As a result, differentiating A. simus from A. pristinus can be difficult, as male individuals of A. pristinus can overlap in size with females of A. simus. Arctodus simus superficially resembled living hyaenids in skull shape and relative lengths of the trunk, back and limbs. The most nearly complete skeleton of A. simus found in the United States was unearthed in Fulton County, Indiana; the original bones are in the Field Museum of Natural History, Chicago. Historically, individual specimens of A. simus from Missouri and Texas have been suggested to represent new species, due to limb and cranial characteristics respectively.

==== Skull ====
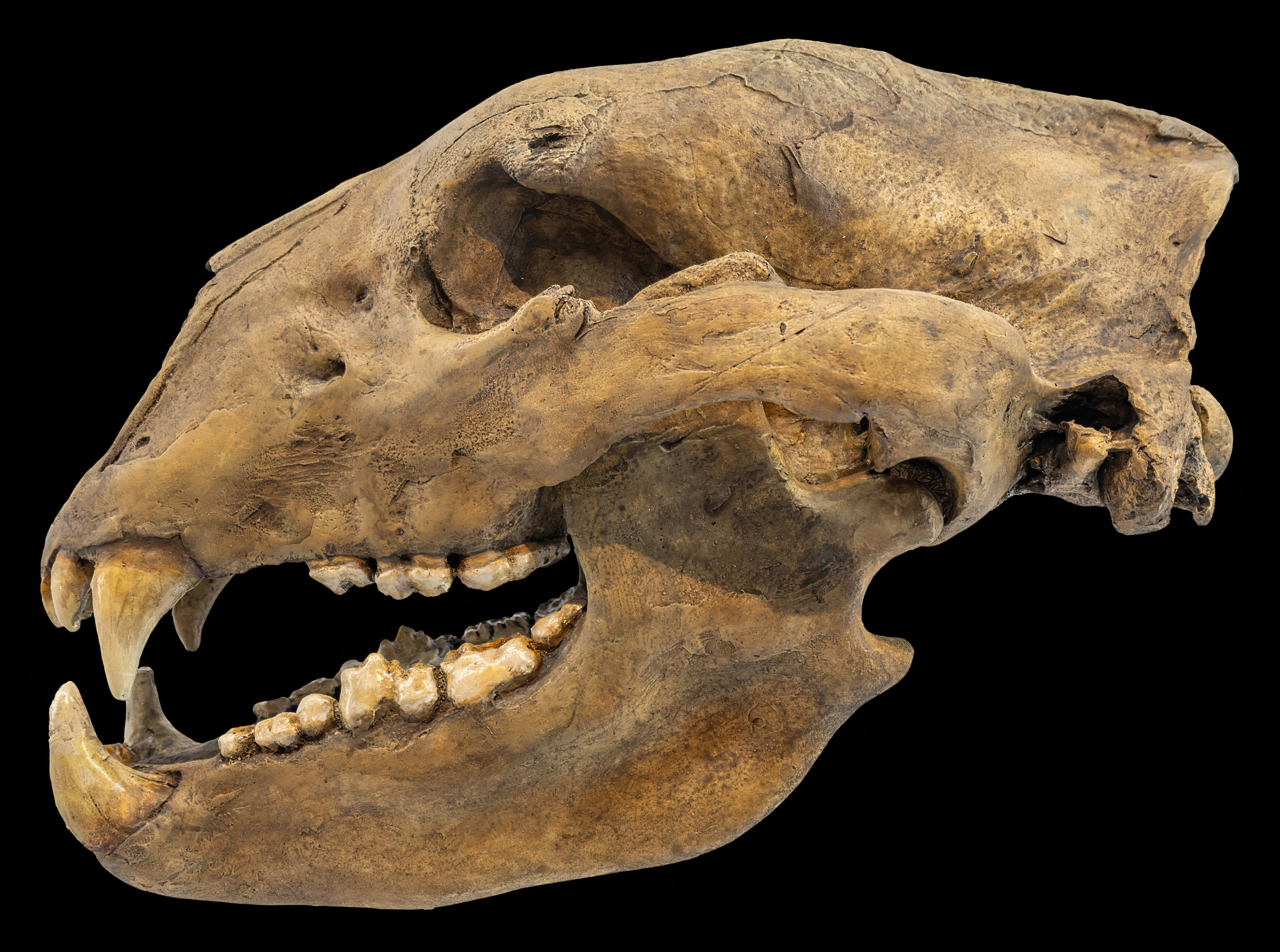
A. simus skull, Royal Tyrrell Museum of Palaeontology in Drumheller, Alberta

Members of the Tremarctinae subfamily of bears appear to have a disproportionately short snout compared with most modern bears, giving them the name "short-faced". Arctodus has also been argued to exhibit a wide and shortened rostrum, potentially giving Arctodus a more felid-like appearance. Matheus suggested that a broad snout could have housed a highly developed olfactory apparatus, or accommodated a larger throat passage to bolt down large food items, akin to spotted hyenas. This apparent shortness, though, is an illusion caused by the deep snouts and short nasal bones of tremarctine bears compared with ursine bears; Arctodus has a deeper but not a shorter face than most living bears. This characteristic is also shared by the only living tremarctine bear, the omniherbivorous spectacled bear. Snout deepness could be variable, as specimens from Huntington Reservoir in Utah, and the Hill-Shuler locality, Texas, were noted as being distinctly "short-faced" in comparison with other A. simus individuals.

The orbits of Arctodus are proportionally small compared to the size of the skull, and somewhat laterally orientated (a characteristic of tremarctine bears), more so than actively predatory carnivorans or even the brown bear, suggesting that stereoscopic vision was not a priority. The optic canal and other sphenoidal openings crowd together more in A. simus than in Ursus. Although samples are limited, the middle ear bones of A. simus are proportionally larger than modern ursine bears, suggesting the species was particularly attuned to low-frequency sounds. The canalis semicircularis lateral suggests that A. pristinus had a head posture of 48°, which being more oblique than several Arctotherium and Tremarctos species, could also infer a greater capacity for long-distance vision. An endocast of an A. simus skull calculated the brain's length to 16.8 cm, with an encephalization quotient of 0.84 and a neocorticalization percentage of 59.45%. With values comparable to a black bear and notably higher than a brown bear, the neocorticalization percentage for A. simus was average for the Quaternary mammals studied.

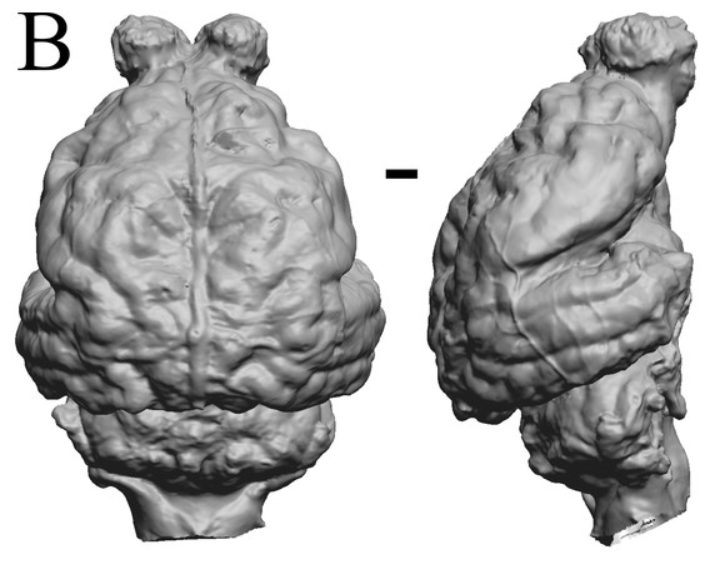
Digital endocast of the cranial cavity of A. simus (FMNH PM 59022).

Morphologically, Arctodus simus exhibits masticular characteristics common to herbivorous bears. This includes cheek teeth with large, blunt surface areas, a deep mandible, and large mandibular muscle attachments (which are rare in carnivorous mammals). As herbivorous carnivorans such as Arctodus lack the gut microbiota to efficiently break down plant matter, these features created a high mechanical advantage of the jaw to break down plant matter via extensive chewing or grinding. Although the low mandibular condyle relative to the tooth row (and therefore potential wide gape) of Arctodus simus has been inferred as an adaptation for carnivory, it is also present in the omniherbivorous spectacled bear. Both A. pristinus and T. floridanus have condyles raised well above the plane of the teeth, although some A. pristinus specimens from Florida seem to also possess a low mandibular condyle. The purpose of the highly vaulted calvarium and straight cheek bones of A. simus have been similarly disputed. Michael Voorhies and Richard Corner argue that the jaws of A. simus are suited to deliver a strong bite at the canines, and calculated the force of the temporalis muscle of A. simus as being stronger than modern Ursus and canids, but equivalent to modern lions and Panthera atrox.

A 2009 analysis of the mandibular morphology of tremarctine bears found notable differences between A. pristinus and A. simus, with A. simus specimens possessing a concave jaw, large masseter and temporalis muscles, deeper horizontal ramus, and a reduced slicing dentition length when compared to A. pristinus. Instead, A. simus was most similar to Arctotherium angustidens, but both species of Arctodus and Arctotherium angustidens were still comfortably in the "omnivorous" bear craniomorphotype.

===== Dentition =====
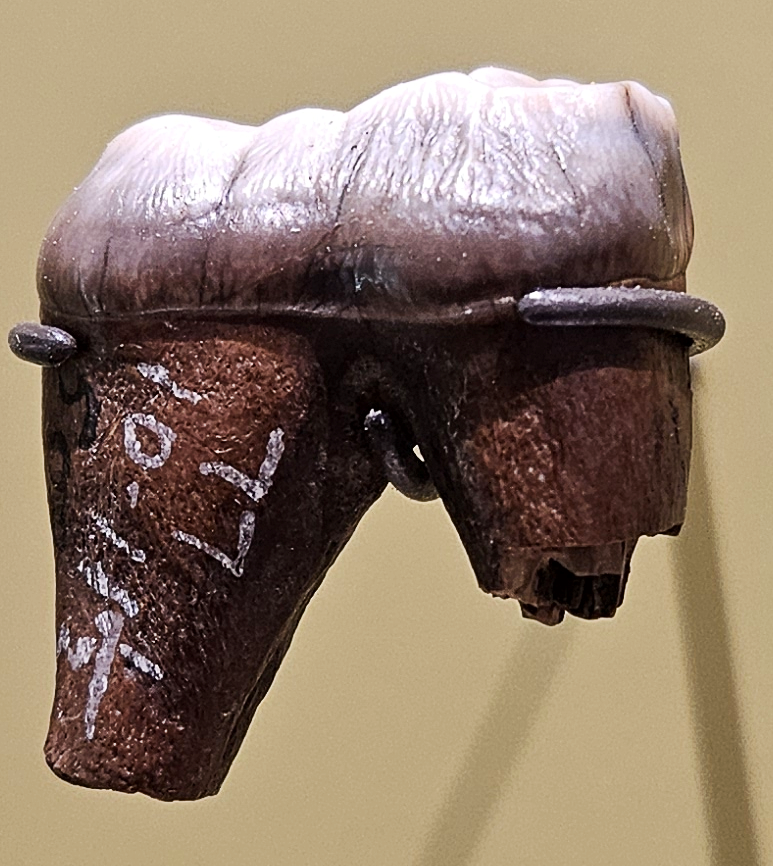
Right lower second molar (M2) of A. simus, from Rancho La Brea, California

The premolars and first molars of A. pristinus are relatively smaller and more widely spaced than those of A. simus. As with other tremarctines, the features of the dentition can be quite variable, particularly the M2 molar. Dentition can be a poor indicator of size in A. simus, as some medium-sized individuals have teeth that surpass the size of those with the largest skeletons. Additionally, while A. simus evolved from the smaller A. pristinus, their teeth remained generally the same size.

An analysis of the Hunter-Schreger bands from the teeth of A. pristinus and A. simus demonstrated an evolutionary trend towards partially reinforced tooth enamel. This has been convergently evolved with giant pandas, agriotheriin bears, and Hemicyon. The dentition of A. simus has been used as evidence of a predatory lifestyle, in particular the large canines, and the high-crowned lower first molar creating a possible carnassial shear with the upper fourth premolar. Additionally, old individuals of A. simus exhibit heavy wear of the first molar and upper fourth premolar. However, the wearing of the molars to a relatively flat and blunt loph (suitable as a crushing platform as per modern omnivorous bears), small shear facet, and the flattened cusps across age ranges (unlike carnivores, which instead have carnassial shears) disagree with this hypothesis. Preliminary research suggests that while A. pristinus evolved proportionally larger lower first molars, A. simus saw the marked reduction in the size of these teeth. The purpose of the low relative grinding area of the molars has been questioned.

==== Postcranial ====
===== Limbs =====
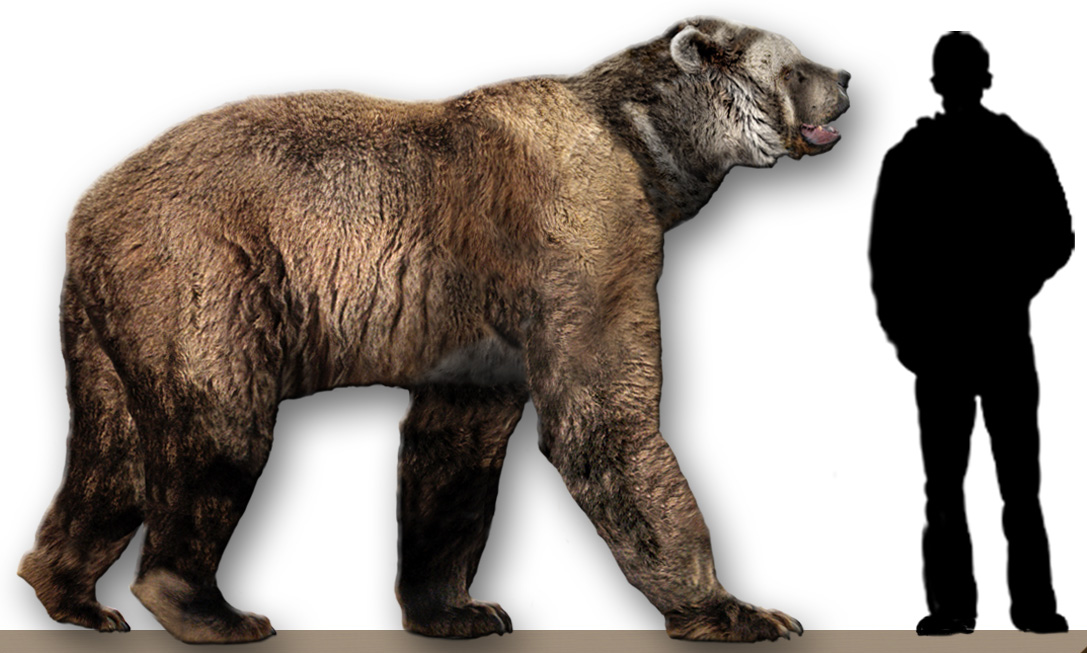
A. simus compared with a human.

Researchers have differing interpretations on the limb morphology of Arctodus. A comprehensive 2010 study concluded that the legs of Arctodus were not proportionally longer than modern bears would be expected to have, and that bears in general are long-limbed animals, obscured in life by their girth and fur. The study concluded the supposed "long-legged" appearance of the bear is largely an illusion created by the animal's relatively shorter back and torso. In fact, Arctodus probably had an even shorter back than other bears, due to the necessary ratio between body length and body mass of the huge bear. Other researchers, however, argue that the limb bones of A. simus are proportionally longer than those of other bears, leading to a "gracile" appearance. Although longer, the proportions still overlap with Ursus, and the limb bones are stouter than in big cats. Rather than for running, these elongated limb bones may have evolved for increased locomotor efficiency during prolonged travel. This stiff-legged, swinging gait could have been similar to that of a polar bear. The forelimb morphology of A. simus has been argued to represent the early stages of cursorial evolution, however the lack of distally elongated limbs and elbow morphology discredits this. Additional theories suggest that proportionally longer limbs may be an adaptation for increased vision over tall ground cover in an open habitat, or were used in tearing and pulling down vegetation.

Most researchers believe that A. simus had well developed medial humeral epicondyles, facilitating powerful forelimbs. The relatively broad humeral and femoral epicondyles (being characteristic of polar bears and diggers) supports the idea of powerful forearms capable of subduing large prey, while also suggesting A. simus could have foraged for roots, tubers, and ground squirrels. A. simus has also been argued to possess higher degree of forelimb dexterity, due shape of the elbow joint, along with a well-developed medial epicondyle (forming an angle with the condyle), and a shallower olecranon fossa supporting a wide range of ulna rotation. While terrestrial, this ancestral trait for arboreality was retained in Arctodus (along with Arctotherium and the giant panda) to either assist in foraging for vegetation, subdue prey, or scavenge carcasses.

===== Paws =====
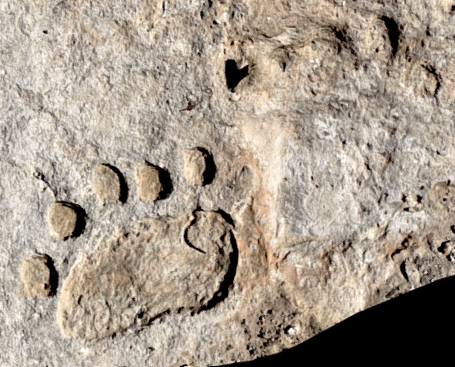
Pawprints of A. simus recovered from White Sands National Park, New Mexico.

The paws (metapodials and phalanges) of Arctodus were characteristically long, slender, and more elongated along the third and fourth digits compared to ursine bears. Arctodus' paws were therefore more symmetrical than ursine bears, whose feet have axes aligned with the most lateral (fifth) digit. Also, the first digit of Arctodus was positioned more closely and parallel to the other four digits (i.e. with straight toes, Arctodus had less lateral splaying).

However, trackways attributed to A. simus from near Lakeview, Oregon exhibit strong toe splaying, with three centrally aligned and evenly spaced toes at the front, and two almost perpendicular lateral toes (80° from the axis of the foot on either side). The pawprints possessed oval-shaped, undivided pads on their soles, front paws that were slightly larger than its back paws, long claws, and suggest A. simus had a hindfoot overstep the forefoot when walking like modern bears. An A. simus pawprint from White Sands National Park measured 15 cm (5.9 in) long and 19 cm (7.5 in) wide, with some claw marks attributed to A. simus at Riverbluff Cave (as they were 4 m above the floor of the cave) also being nearly 20 cm in width.

The presence of a partial false thumb in A. simus is a characteristic shared with T. floridanus and the spectacled bear, and is possibly an ancestral trait. Absent in the Ursinae, the false thumb of the spectacled bear has been suggested to assist in herbivorous food manipulation (such as bromeliads, leaves, berries, tree bark and fruits, cactus fruits and pulp, palm hearts and fronds) or arboreality.

==== Pelage ====
Hair assigned to A. simus has been recovered from Big Bear Cave, Missouri, along with Pendejo Cave, New Mexico and The Mammoth Site in South Dakota. Both the Mammoth Site and Pendejo Cave specimens' hair possessed a heavily pigmented cortex densely clustered around a globular, uniserial ladder type of medulla, with the hair from the Mammoth Site further described as "black, curly and somewhat coarse, and measures approximately 5 cm in length".

==== Paleopathology ====
Beyond carbohydrate-associated dental pathologies present in the genus, extensive pathologies have been preserved on the most nearly complete skeleton of Arctodus. The leading hypothesis suggests the Fulton County Arctodus specimen suffered from a syphilis-like (treponemal) disease, or yaws, based on the various lesions present. The same individual records a pathological growth distorting the right humerus, with abscesses noted between the molars and on both ulnae. Hypotheses include syphilis, osteoarthritis, a fungal infection in addition to long-term syphilis, or an infected wound. Several specimens from Fairbanks, Alaska, also exhibit either pathological growths or periodontal disease, along with a healed toe bone from Big Bear Cave, Missouri.

== Paleobiology ==
=== Locomotion ===
Paul Matheus proposed that A. simus may have moved in a highly efficient, moderate-speed pacing gait, more specialized than modern bears. His research concluded that the large body size, taller front legs, high shoulders, short and sloping back, and long legs of Arctodus also compounded locomotive efficiency, as these traits swelled the amount of usable elastic strain energy in the tendons, and increased stride length, making Arctodus built more for endurance than for great speed. His calculations suggested that Arctodus likely had a top speed of 40–45 km/h (25–28 mph), and based on hyaenid proportions, would shift from single-foot locomotion to a pace at 8.5 km/h (5.3 mph), and would begin to gallop at 18.5 km/h (11.5 mph), a fairly high speed. Based on other mammals, the optimal pace speed of Arctodus would have been 13.7 km/h (8.5 mph). For comparison, hyenas cross country at 10 km/h (6.2 mph). This mobility would have facilitated travelling across a large home range, which may have topped 1,000 sq mi (2,600 km^{2}). Swimming has also been presented as a hypothesis for the colonization of Vancouver Island by Arctodus simus.

=== Maturity ===
Examinations on a mostly full-sized (likely 4 to 6-year-old female) individual of A. simus from an Ozark cave suggest that Arctodus, like other ursids, reached sexual maturity well before full maturity. Fused sutures, epiphyses, and epiphyseal plates, well developed premassateric fossa, along with tooth eruption and tooth wear, have been used to determine adulthood in Arctodus.

=== Genetic diversity ===
DNA distribution map of Arctodus simus

Legend: A. simus described by Salis et al. (2025)

Chiquihuite Cave A. simus

Unassigned A. simus

Several mitochondrial DNA studies suggest Arctodus simus had a notably low level of genetic diversity, comparable with solitary & wide-ranging carnivorans such lynx and puma, or species with recent bottlenecks. A landmark 2025 study demonstrated that A. simus lived in a single interconnected population and was wide-ranging, which may be linked with its morphological adaptations towards long-distance travel. A. simus lacked mitochondrial endemism, and like other fauna endemic to the pre-Pleistocene Americas, A. simus maintained genetic connectivity between its eastern Beringian population and populations south of the ice sheets until the isolation of Beringia during the Last Glacial Maximum, with four distinct lineages across five haplotypes intermingled with eastern Beringian specimens. The last common ancestor between Beringian and southern populations was 31,500 BP.

While suggested by Kurtén in the past, there is no evidence for subspecies in A. simus, such as distinctive genetic diversity or phylogeographic structure. The last common ancestor between all specimens from the 2025 study was the Middle Pleistocene (209,100 BP); however, all specimens which postdate 100,000 BP have a last common ancestor was in the Late Pleistocene (73,600 BP). However, this does not entirely preclude genetic diversity in Arctodus simus, with genetic samples from Chiquihuite cave, Zacatecas possibly indicating a deep divergence with other specimens of A. simus. A sample from the Channel islands has been studied but its relatedness is unknown.

A 2020 analysis of the genetic history of three A. simus individuals from the Yukon suggests an extended history of small effective population size. A steady decline of the breeding population around 1 Mya (from about 16,500 individuals to 4,000 individuals) was halted by a slight increase in numbers 60,000 BP (7,500 individuals). This was followed by a decrease around 48,000 BP (correlated with expanding Yukon forests circa the MIS 3 interstadial), which continued until the local extinction of Beringian A. simus by near 23,000 BP during the last glacial maximum.

== Hibernation ==
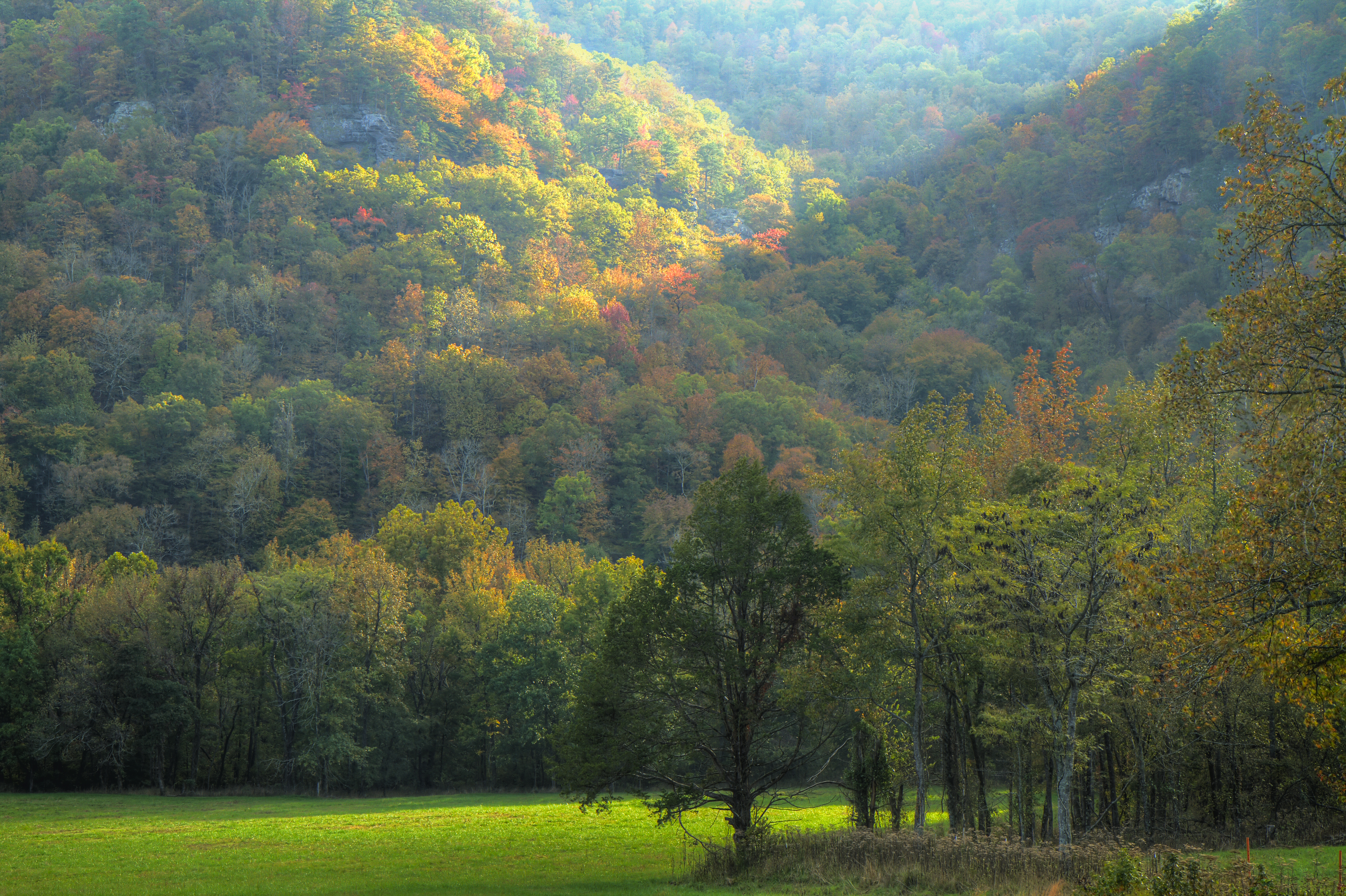
A. simus specimens have been particularly plentiful from caves in the montane woodlands of the US Interior Highlands, such as the Ozarks.

Arctodus pristinus specimens have been found in caves such as Port Kennedy (Pennsylvania, where fossils from as many as 36 individuals have been found), Cumberland Cave (Maryland) and Hamilton Cave (West Virginia), often in association with the black bear. This suggests a close association with the biome.

According to a 2003 study, in karst regions, fossils of A. simus have been recovered almost exclusively from cave sites. In the contiguous United States, that about 38% of all sites are from caves (possibly 50% in western USA) suggests a close association between this species and cave environments. Metabolic denning (hibernation/torpor) is unclear in Arctodus. Like polar bears, males and unmated females of A. simus may have forgone denning, leaving maternal denning by females as the preferred explanation behind the recovery of the small, yet relatively complete individuals recovered from caves. No physical remains of adults with associated offspring are currently known, however trace fossils of co-denning have been reported from Riverbluff Cave. Regardless, Arctotherium angustidens, a fellow giant short-faced bear, has been recovered with offspring from a cave in Argentina.

At Riverbluff Cave, the most abundant claw marks are from A. simus. They are most abundant at the bear beds and their associated passageways, indicating a close relationship with denning. Numerous "bear" beds often preserve A. simus and both Pleistocene and modern American black bears in association (U.a. amplidens and U. a. americanus)- such deposits have been found in Missouri, Oklahoma, and Potter Creek Cave, California. These mixed deposits are assumed to have accumulated over time, as individual bears (including Arctodus) died during winter sleep. Furthermore, environmental DNA suggests that Arctodus and black bears shared a cave in Chiquihuite Cave, Zacatecas. At Labor-of-Love Cave (Nevada) both American black bears and brown bears have been found in association with A. simus. A 1985 study noted that sympatry between Arctodus and brown bears preserved in caves is rare, with only Little Box Elder Cave (Wyoming) and Fairbanks II (Alaska) hosting similar remains.

== Diet ==
Scholars today mostly conclude that A. simus was a colossal, opportunistic omnivore, with a flexible, locally adapted diet akin to the brown bear. If A. simus wasn't largely herbivorous, the scavenging of megaherbivore carcasses, and the occasional predatory kill would have complimented the large amounts of vegetation consumed when available.

=== Herbivory ===
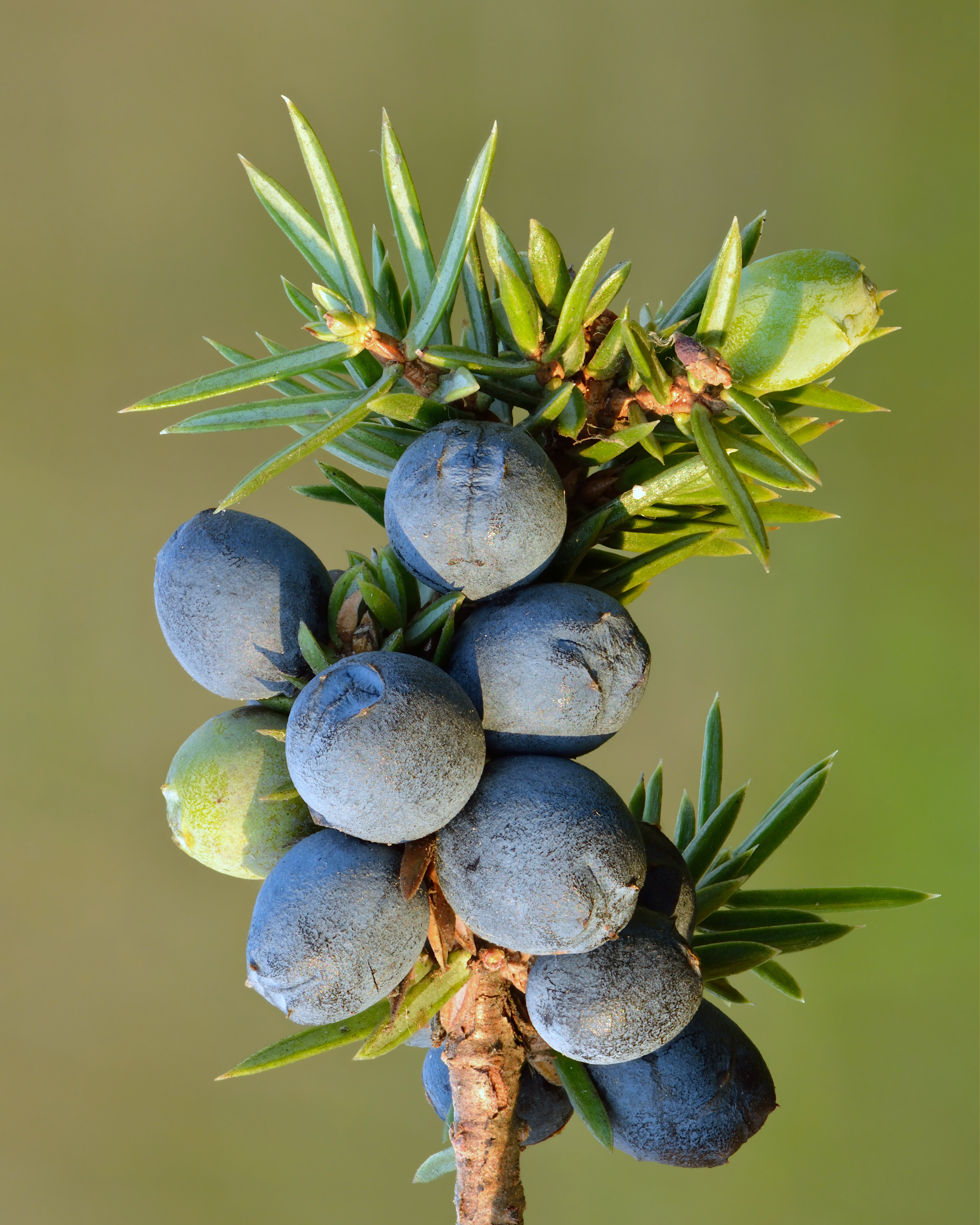
Arctodus faeces found at South Dakota and the Yukon contain Juniperus seeds. Seed cones and berries are still important food sources for northern bears today.

The fact that Arctodus did not significantly differ in dentition or build from modern bears has led most authors to support the hypothesis that the A. simus was omnivorous, like most modern bears, and would have eaten significant amounts of plant matter. Morphologically, A. simus exhibits masticular and dental characteristics that confirm that short-faced bears such as the spectacled bear and Arctodus were adapted to and actively consumed vegetation. This is affirmed by a lack of dental damage associated with carnivory amongst specimens of Arctodus. Dental pathologies that have been found, such as incisor wear and supragingival dental calculi in a young individual from Missouri, and cavities associated with carbohydrate consumption in individuals from the La Brea Tar Pits and Pellucidar Cave (Vancouver Island), further suggest an omnivorous diet for A. simus. Additional morphological adaptations include dexterous forelimbs and a partial false thumb, which would have assisted in foraging for vegetation, along with the body size of large A. simus (about 1000 kg) matching or exceeding the expected upper limitations for a terrestrial carnivore (based on the more restrictive energy base for a carnivorous diet).

While features of A. simus' morphology suggest herbivory, their close phylogenetic relationship to the omniherbivorous spectacled bear presents the possibility that these traits may be an ancestral condition of the group. A browsing diet foraged from the canopies of trees and shrubs could have been difficult with the large and flattened rostrum and incisor build of Arctodus, while evidence of digging adaptations in Arctodus' forelimbs and claws (e.g. for rooting) is mixed. Regardless, gross tooth wear suggests consumption of plant matter in the diet of A. simus. The diet of individuals from La Brea was most similar to the spectacled bear, which consumes tough leafy matter, seeded and pitted fruits, and occasional animal flesh. Arctodus' tooth wear remained consistent throughout the Pleistocene in La Brea. This indicated a less generalized diet than modern omniherbivorous black bears, with none of the dental evidence of hard food consumption (such as carcasses or nuts) found in polar bears, black bears, and hyenas. Comparisons with the dental microwear of Ursus speleaus suggest dietary differences between the species, with cave bears consuming tougher vegetation than A. simus. Although some researchers argue that herbivory should be more obvious from the isotope data gathered from northern A. simus, several A. simus coprolites from The Mammoth Site in South Dakota and Meander Cave at Ni'iinlii'njik Territorial Park, Yukon contain Juniperus seeds (toxic to black and brown bears).

=== Predatory behavior ===
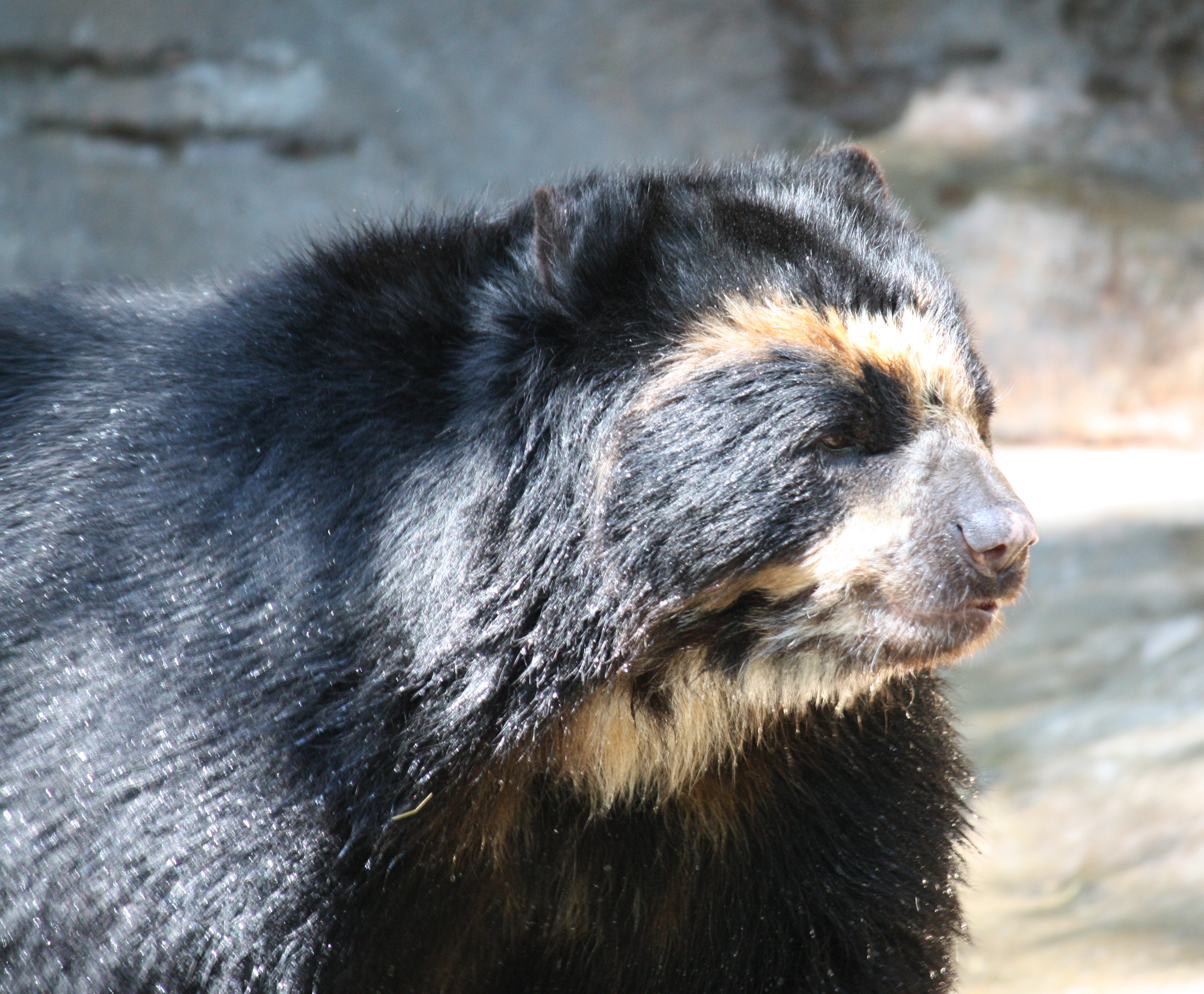
Arctodus' closest living relative is the spectacled bear. Although mostly herbivorous, Tremarctos ornatus is occasionally an active predator.

Evidence suggests that Arctodus also consumed meat, as evidenced by elevated nitrogen-15 isotope levels (corresponding to protein consumption) and bone damage on contemporary fauna. Additionally, elevated carbon-13 levels (corresponding to C_{3} resources) largely suggest browsers (and browsed vegetation) were the core of A. simus' diet.

Arctodus simus' status as a predator is questioned by its gracility and lack of agility, which could have complicated predation upon adult megaherbivores, and hindered the chasing down of nimbler prey. Nevertheless, larger A. simus males are suggested to have been more carnivorous than females, as very large brown bears may not be able to sustain themselves on a vegetarian diet. Furthermore, the much larger frame of A. simus would have provided an advantage in disputes over carcasses.

Studies establish that A. simus would have had a varied diet across its range, and was outcompeted and/or more herbivorous with increased competition from other predators. The extinction of cursorial, hypercarnivorous Borophagus and Huracan in the more open western North America left a vacant niche, possibly contributing to the evolution of A. simus (along with the proliferation of bovids in the herbivore guild).

==== Bone damage ====
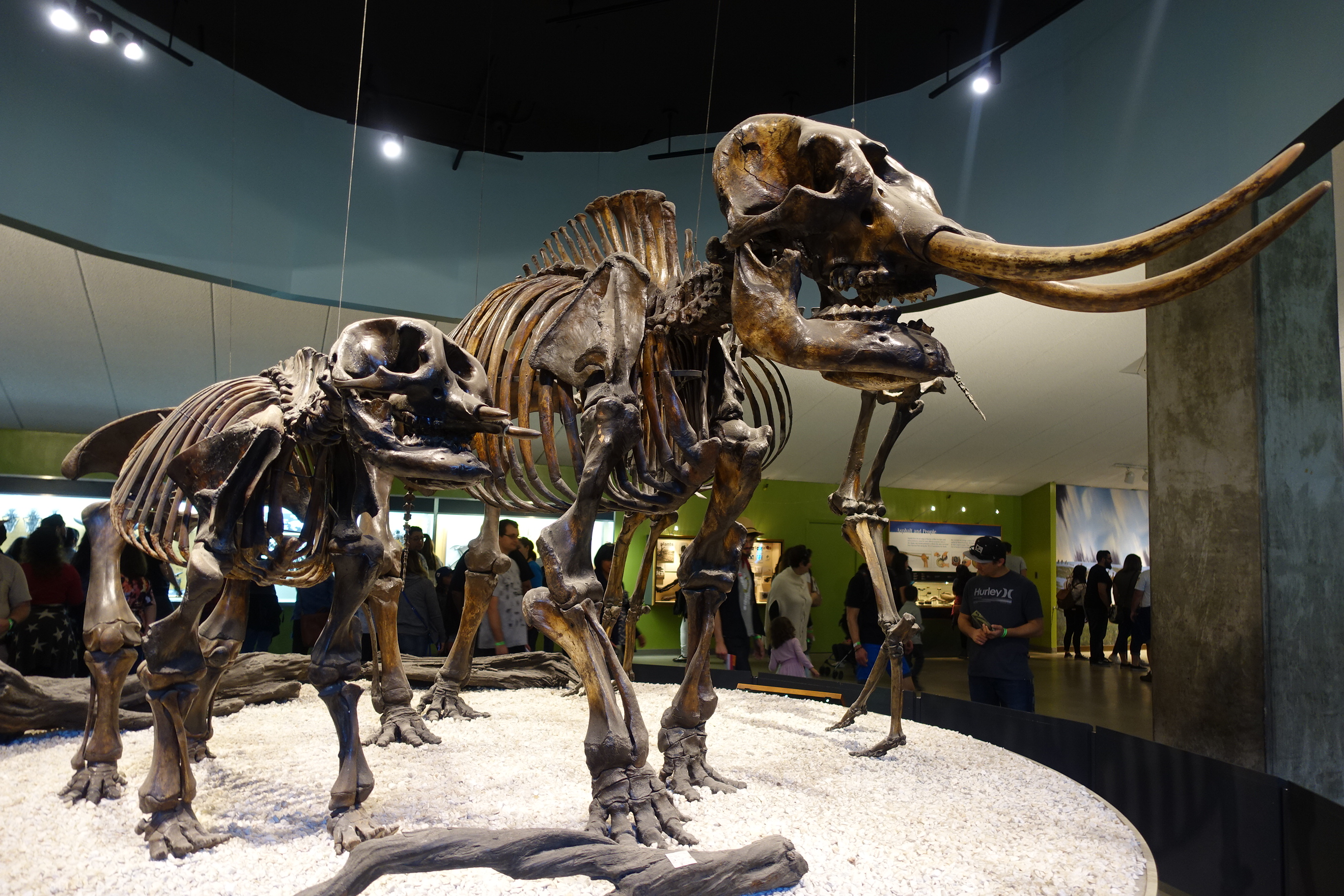
Arctodus may have found young proboscideans to be suitable prey.

The bite marks found on many bones of ground sloths (Northrotheriops texanus) and young proboscideans at Leisey Shell Pit in Florida matched the size of the canine teeth of A. pristinus. Whether these bite marks are the result of active predation or scavenging is unknown. Additionally, A. pristinus was the most common large predator from Port Kennedy Cave, Pennsylvania, where the majority of mastodon remains were juveniles and likely represent accumulated prey.

Arctodus simus has been found in association with proboscidean remains near Frankstown, Pennsylvania, (juvenile mastodon), and near Huntington Reservoir, Utah and the Mammoth Site, South Dakota (Columbian mammoths). Additionally, a mammoth rib from the Mammoth Site has a canine puncture likely caused by A. simus, with several Columbian mammoth bones from Huntington Reservoir also recording ursid gnaw marks attributed to A. simus. A woolly mammoth specimen from Saltville, Virginia was likely scavenged on by A. simus, as evidenced by a canine gouge through the calcaneus.

While the canines of Panthera atrox overlap in size with A. simus, complicating the identification of tooth marks, damaged bones from near Tanana River, Alaska, suggest that A. simus transported megafaunal long bones back to a cave-like den and chewed on them, at a time when lions had a limited overlap with A. simus in Beringia. Spiral fractures on ungulate long bones from Red Willow, Nebraska may have also been caused by A. simus. Furthermore, a perforated peccary ilium from Sheriden Cave, and peccary remains from Riverbluff Cave may also have been modified by A. simus. Bone damage on a cranial fragment (and possibly the humerus) of an Arctodus individual on Vancouver Island may have been due to cannibalism.

=== Isotope analysis ===
==== Carbon-13 ====
Carbon-13 levels in Arctodus simus (enriched by both plants and prey matter) consistently reflect a diet based on C_{3} resources, as analyzed from specimens from Alaska, California, San Luis Potosí, Texas, Vancouver Island, Wyoming, and the Yukon. C_{3} resources are typically found in closed to mixed habitats with at least some tree cover (such as open woodlands). This includes C_{3} vegetation (leaves, stems, fruits, bark, and flowers from trees, shrubs, and cool season grasses) and the browsers that fed on them, such as deer, camelids, tapir, bison, peccaries and ground sloths.

Isotope sample map of Arctodus simus (hover over dots for more information)

Legend: δ13C δ15N

Both δ13C & δ15N

However, studies are complicated by a lack of compound-specific data, with isotope data being variable in carbon-13. For example, while the specimen from Cedral, San Luis Potosí had the strongest δ^{13}C value of its local fauna, specimens analyzed in a 2012 study from Wyoming (Little Box Elder Cave, Natural Trap Cave) had the lowest δ^{13}C of the studied fauna, with only Ursus from Little Box Elder Cave being lower. The authors suggest that seasonality & individual choices within omnivorous diets could result in extreme isotope data in certain teeth.

==== Nitrogen-15 ====
Broadly elevated nitrogen-15 levels in A. simus suggest that A. simus occupied a relatively high trophic level. Data can be variable across individuals and localities; while samples from Rancho La Brea were on a spectrum, some specimens were on the same trophic level as Smilodon fatalis. Specimens from northern Vancouver Island had distinctly lower nitrogen-15 levels, however this may be due to competition between female A. simus and brown bears. While samples from Alaska, Texas, and Vancouver Island were of terrestrial origin, samples from coastal California suggested a ~19% consumption rate of seals (along with bison and camels). This partial reliance on marine resources has been suggested to be as a result of a competitive carnivore guild on mainland California.

Although elevated nitrogen-15 levels have been argued to indicate pure carnivory, even the isotope data of the most carnivorous Beringian Arctodus overlapped with modern, typically omniherbivorous brown bears from Europe, central Montana, and eastern Wyoming, demonstrating that isotope data cannot distinguish between hypercarnivores and omnivores that eat a significant amount of animal matter. Studies are also complicated by a lack of compound-specific data. The variability of δ^{15}N, such as the extremely high levels from Natural Trap Cave (Wyoming) and Dawson (Yukon) have been suggested by authors to be influenced by the isotopic composition of the local environment and prey (such as muskox), individual/evolving prey and plant choices, the regionalization and flexibility of A. simus' diet, and nutritional stress.

== Paleoecology ==
=== Arctodus pristinus ===
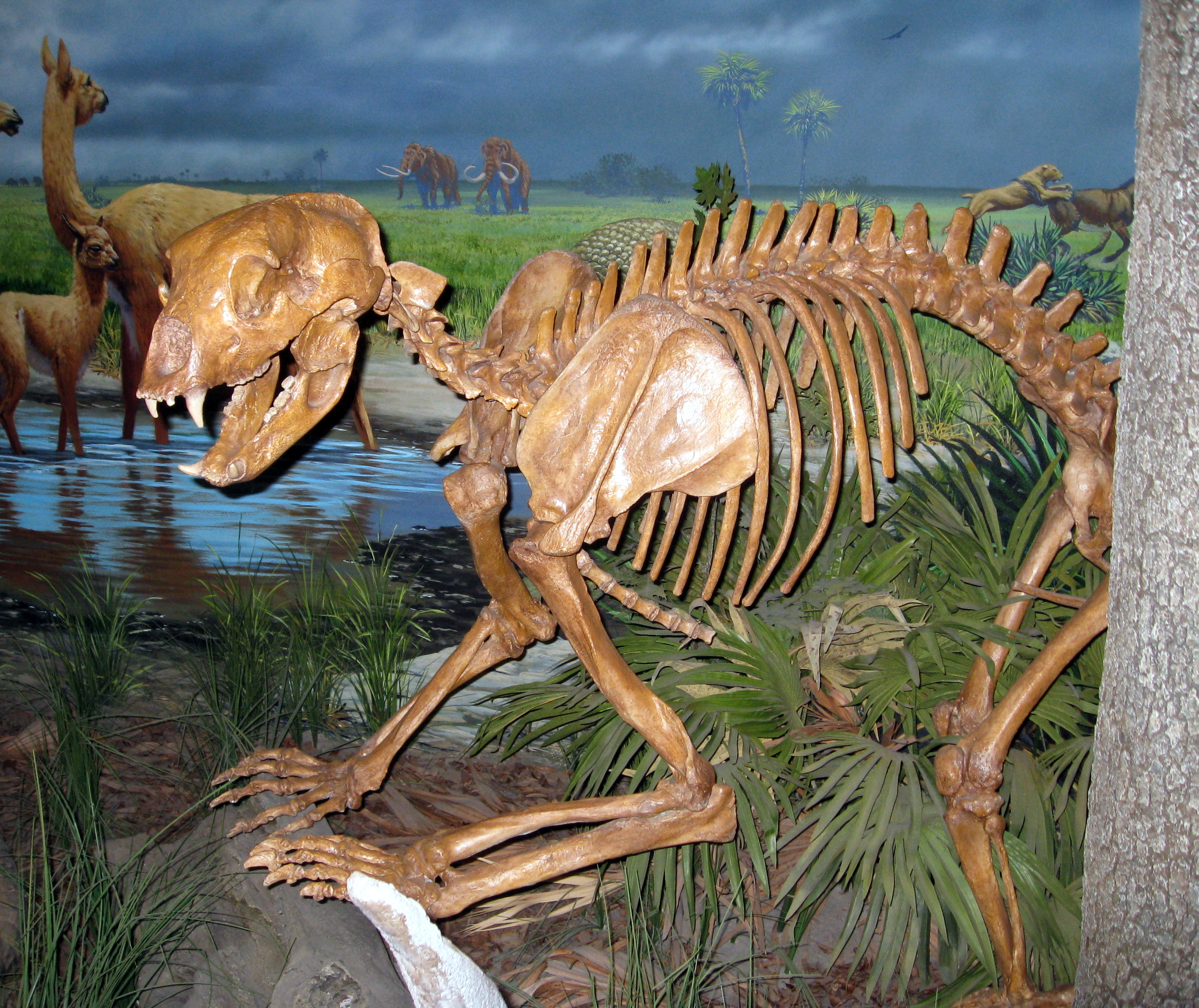
A reconstruction of Arctodus pristinus, from the Bishop Museum of Science and Nature, Florida.

Traditionally thought to be endemic to the late Blancan faunal stage and Irvingtonian faunal stage, Arctodus pristinus was a relatively large tremarctine bear. Sometimes referred to as the eastern short-faced bear, A. pristinus has been found in Florida, Kansas, Maryland, Nebraska, New Mexico, Pennsylvania, South Carolina, and West Virginia in the US, and Aguascalientes & Jalisco in Mexico. Possible remains have also been recovered from Arizona, along with potential Rancholabrean sites from Mexico (Puebla, State of Mexico). A. pristinus is particularly well known from Florida, especially from the Leisey Shell Pit. Like A. simus and other tremarctine bears, A. pristinus had adaptations for herbivory, and was likely largely herbivorous itself, although Arctodus has been suggested to be generally more carnivorous than contemporary bears.

==== Eastern North America ====
Arctodus pristinus is considered a biochronological indicator for the period between the Late Blancan and late Irvingtonian periods of Pleistocene Florida- more fossils of A. pristinus are known from Florida (about 150) than anywhere else. A. pristinus recovered from Florida have intraspecific variation that has probable temporal and geographic origins. Regardless of overall size, some A. pristinus specimens from Leisley Shell Pit 1A possessed dental dimensions and mandibular characteristics more similar to A. simus than to other A. pristinus. In the Early Pleistocene of Blancan Florida, the Santa Fe River 1 site (~2.2 Ma), which Arctodus pristinus inhabited, was a fairly open grassland environment dotted with karst sinks and springs and dominated by longleaf pine flatwoods. Arctodus pristinus co-existed with terror birds, sabertooth cats, giant sloths (Eremotherium, Megalonyx, Paramylodon), giant armadillos (Glyptotherium, Holmesina, Pachyarmatherium), gomphotheres, hyenas, canids (Borophagus, Canis lepophagus), peccaries, llamas, dwarf pronghorns, and three-toed horses. Smaller fauna included condors, rails, ducks, porcupines, and alligators.

=== Arctodus simus ===
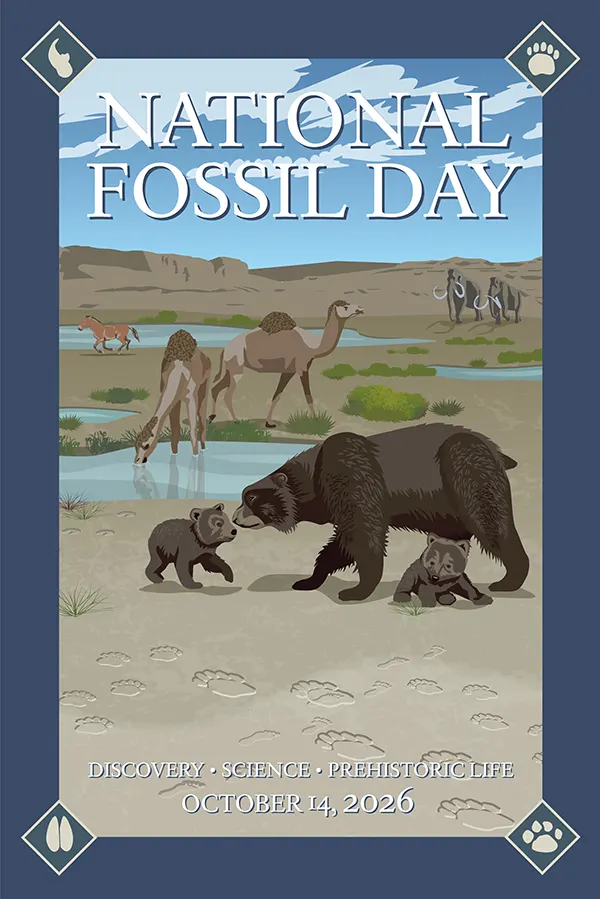
Official artwork for National Fossil Day 2026, featuring an Arctodus simus family and pawprints in White Sands National Park.

Evolving from the smaller A. pristinus in the early Irvingtonian faunal stage, Arctodus simus has been recovered from a comparatively small number of finds in relation to other large carnivorans, with the species suggested to have lived in low population densities. Sometimes referred to as the bulldog bear, short-faced cave bear, or great short-faced bear, Matheus argues that unlike other Nearctic carnivorans, A. simus did not appear to have an ecological equivalent ("super-huge bear") in the Palearctic realm.

Irvingtonian age specimens of Arctodus simus have currently only been recovered from the United States (west of the Mississippi River). However, in the following Rancholabrean faunal stage, A. simus expanded its range across the Nearctic realm of North America, inhabiting a variety of climatic conditions and environments. A 2009 study examining megafaunal extinctions in Northern America noted 12 records (<40,000 BP) of Arctodus simus from the Intermontane Plateaus, 7 from the Pacific Mountain System, 6 each from the Interior Plains and Interior Highlands, 3 each from the Atlantic Plains and Rocky Mountain System, and 1 from the Appalachian Highlands. Huge individuals from Alaska to Florida suggest that the late Rancholabrean may have contained the largest known individuals of A. simus.

==== North American Cordillera ====
The western United States seems to represent a cradle of evolution for Arctodus simus, with the earliest known finds being recovered from the early Irvingtonian faunal stage of the Pacific Mountain System (California, Oregon), with potential records from the Pacific Mountain System and Intermontane Plateaus of southern California possibly being from the late Blancan faunal stage.

Thereafter in the Rancholabrean faunal stage, A. simus was relatively plentiful in western North America, with over 50% of specimens from the western contiguous United States (<40,000 BP). Arctodus simus was integral to what has been referred to as the Camelops fauna, or alternatively Camelops/"Navahoceros" fauna, a faunal province centered in western North America. The Camelops fauna was also characterized by shrub-ox, prairie dogs, dwarf pronghorns, Shasta ground sloths, and American lions. The diverse flora of the Camelops faunal province included montane conifers and oak parklands, shrub and grassland that stretched across the North American Cordillera south of Canada, to the Valley of Mexico. This faunal province supported a variety of large grazing and browsing mammals.

===== Western Mountains =====
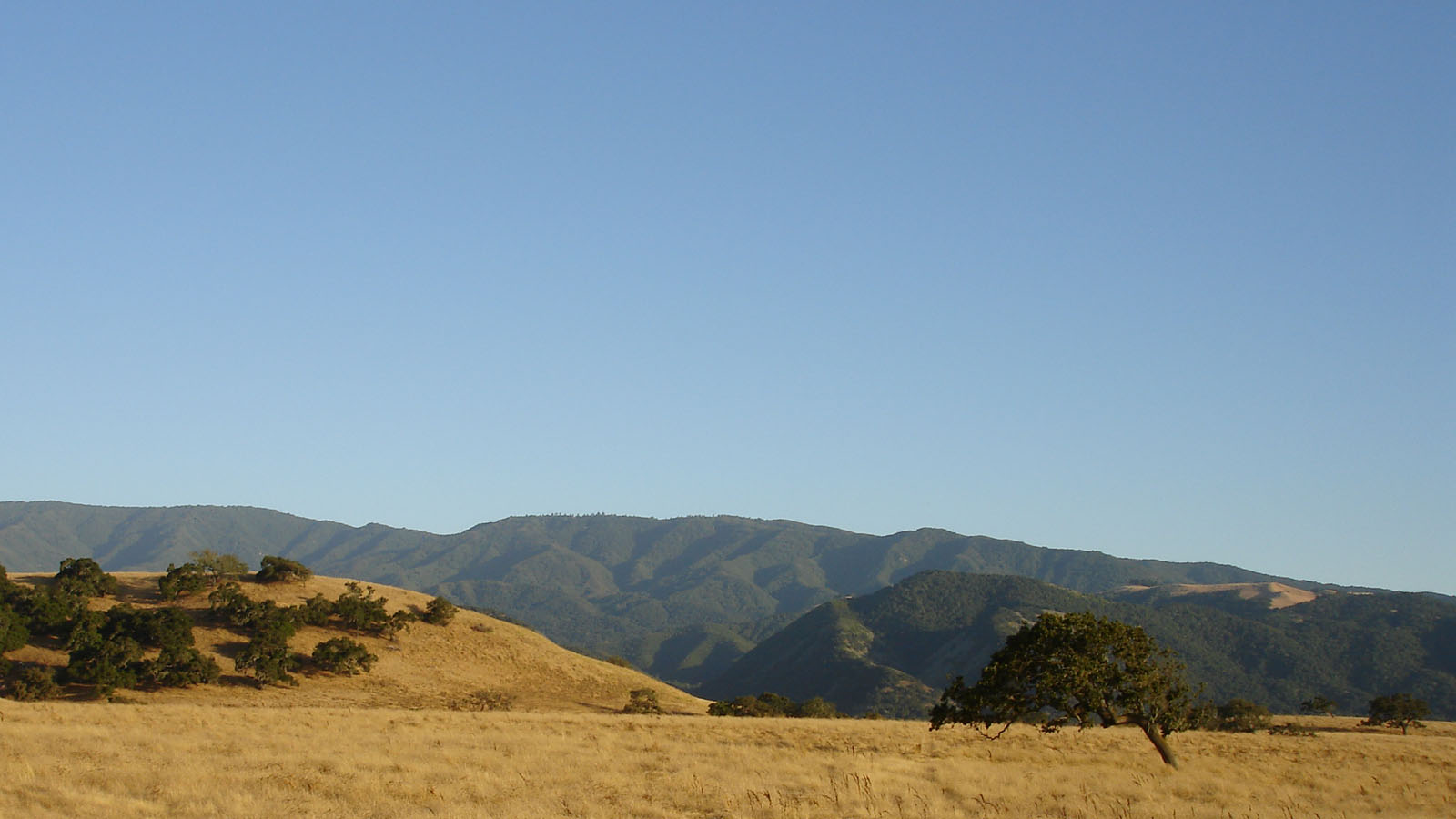
Arctodus simus inhabited Californian savannas for more than a million years.

In the Pacific Mountain System, despite the shift from C_{3} dominated habitats (Fairmead & Irvington) to aridified, mixed C_{3}-C_{4} grasslands (McKittrick Tar Pits) between the Early and Late Pleistocene of the Central Valley, Arctodus simus remained consistent with the consumption of C_{3} resources, and was the only constant member of the local predator guild (along with dire wolves). Although dental wear and cavities from specimens collected from the La Brea Tar Pits suggest A. simus preferred a herbivorous diet, nitrogen-15 samples from La Brea varied across A. simus individuals, with some specimens being in the same trophic level as Smilodon fatalis. A. simus is particularly famous from fossils found in the La Brea Tar Pits, with 33 individuals recovered (the most of any locality). As only one juvenile has been found from La Brea, A. simus is suggested to have been solitary. Many more finds come from across California.

In Vancouver Island, and Washington, the Pacific Mountain System transitioned from semi-arid woodland/scrub to pine parklands, heath, and forest steppe. According to an isotope analysis, A. simus held an intermediate trophic position between brown bears and black bears on Vancouver Island (~14,500 BP). As per brown and black bears, female A. simus may have had a significant decrease in protein consumption compared with male A. simus when co-existing with brown bears. Additionally, an analysis of Arctodus' data suggested that when consuming protein, meat was preferred. While niche-partitioning on Vancouver Island was possible, both A. simus and brown bears appear to have preferred more open habitats.

Comparatively, the Rocky Mountain System had the fewest number of specimens of A. simus in western North America. However, one of the youngest dated A. simus is from a cave near Huntington Reservoir, Utah, which sits at an elevation of 2,740m (~9,000 ft). The central and southern Rocky Mountains may have acted as refugia for boreal parkland megafauna from the plateau such as A. simus, with the Huntington specimen being the only confirmed extinct megafauna dated to the Younger Dryas of the Great Basin. Other remains have been found from Wyoming (such as Natural Trap Cave), and Montana.

===== Intermontane Plateaus =====
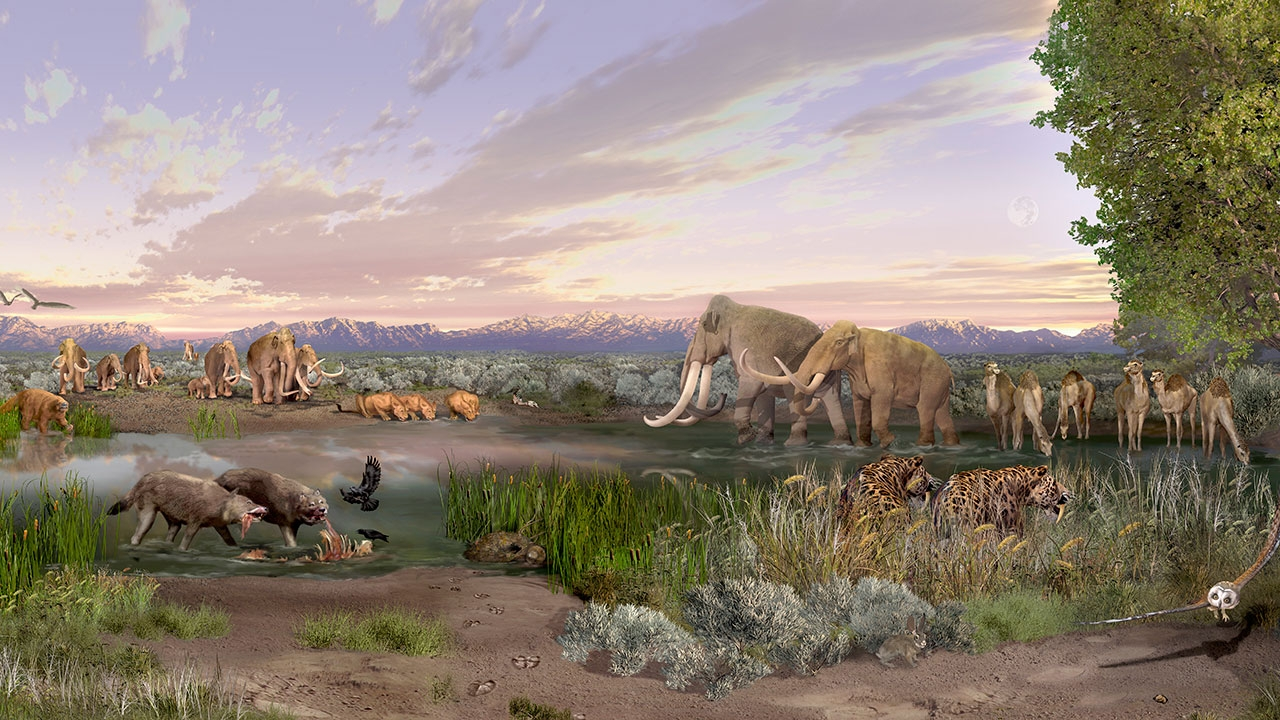
A reconstruction of Rancholabrean New Mexico (White Sands).

The Intermontane Plateaus had the highest number of Arctodus simus specimens south of the ice sheets. The region has yielded some of the largest specimens of A. simus, including what was once the largest specimen on record, from Salt Lake Valley, Utah. In contrast with other parts of North America, the plateaus received more rainfall during the Late Pleistocene, greatly expanding the range of subalpine parkland, piñon-juniper & ponderosa woodlands, sagebrush grasslands and pluvial lakes where desert exists today. Arctodus simus has been recovered from the mid-Wisconsian U-Bar Cave, New Mexico, alongside Shasta ground sloth, shrub-ox, pronghorns (Stockoceros, Capromeryx), Camelops, Odocoileus, horses, Lynx, puma, black bear, mountain goats, prairie dogs, and Stock's vampire bat. Dire wolves were also found in association with Arctodus simus, and both species are the most common large carnivorans of Rancholabrean New Mexico. Beyond Utah and New Mexico, other important US specimens have also been found in Arizona, eastern California, Idaho, Nevada, and eastern Oregon.

The Intermontane Plateaus extended into central Mexico, with the Mexican Plateau sharing the Late Pleistocene mesic savanna and piñon–juniper woodland ecoregion with the southwestern USA. While Arctodus was limited to the Mexican plateau, the typical tropical thorn scrub and scrub woodland of the plateau was seemingly prime habitat for tremarctine bears. An Arctodus simus individual from Cedral, San Luis Potosí, inhabited closed vegetation, with its diet possibly incorporating local C_{3} specialists such as tapir, llamas, camels, and Shasta ground sloth along with browsed vegetation. The site hosted an open gallery forest near grassland or scrub with a humid climate. Similar highland remains have been recovered from Jalisco, Michoacán, Puebla, State of Mexico, and Zacatecas.

==== Interior Plains ====
The Interior Plains were composed of temperate steppe grassland, and among the specimens yielded from this region is one of the largest Arctodus simus currently on record, from the banks of the Kansas river. The late Irvingtonian Doeden gravel pits in Montana preserves an open grassland habitat, with riparian woodlands, and likely some shrublands. A. simus co-existed with ground sloths (Megalonyx, Paramylodon), Pacific mastodon, camels, and Bootherium. As bison were yet to migrate into North America, Columbian mammoths and horses dominated these early Illinoian grasslands. Additional Irvingtonian remains are from Kansas, Nebraska and Texas.

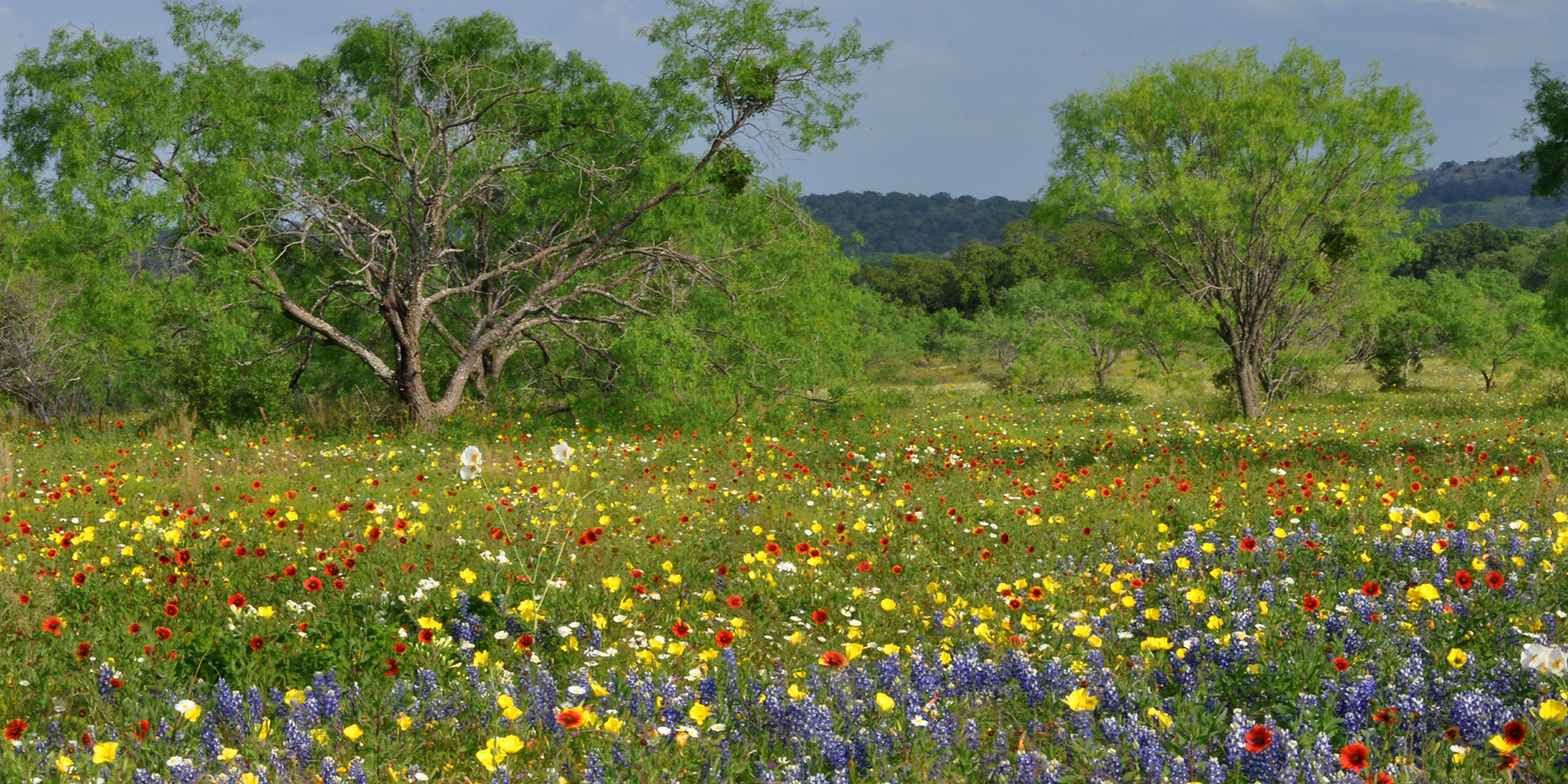
Arctodus also roamed the southern mixed grasslands of Texas.

In the Rancholabrean age, Arctodus simus, grey wolves and coyotes were part of a predator guild throughout the great plains, and were joined by Columbian mammoths, camels, Hemiauchenia, and American pronghorns. While the northern plains aridified into cold steppe (e.g. Mammoth site, South Dakota), the southern plains were a parkland with riparian hackberry forests, and large expanses of mixed grass prairie grasslands grading into wet meadows, with limited seasonality. In the south (Lubbock Lake, Texas), this fauna was joined by Smilodon, dire wolves, grey fox and red fox, preying upon prairie dogs, horses (Equus & Haringtonhippus), peccaries, Odocoileus, Capromeryx, Bison antiquus and Holmesina. A specimen from Friesenhahn Cave had a nitrogen-15 sample closest to the omnivorous striped skunk. Beyond Texas, Arctodus has also been found in Iowa, Kansas, Nebraska, and southern Canada (Alberta & Saskatchewan), which when unglaciated, would have formed a tundra ecosystem with an ice-free corridor to Beringia.

In the lowlands of the eastern Interior plains, the plains transitioned to closed habitat. At the terminal Pleistocene Sheriden Cave, Ohio, a mosaic habitat consisting of marsh, open woodland, and patchy grassland was home to Arctodus simus, Cervalces scotti, caribou, peccaries (Mylohyus, Platygonus), giant beaver, porcupine, and American pine marten. Similar remains have been found in Alabama, Indiana, and Kentucky.

==== Interior Highlands ====
To the south, the Interior Highlands had a very high density of Arctodus simus specimens, due to the high rate of preservation in the cave-rich region, particularly in Missouri. Irvingtonian trace fossils and claw-marks from Riverbluff Cave may be as old as 570,000 years old. Black bears were also very common, with A. simus has been found in association with black bears at Bat, Big Bear, and Perkins caves. During the Last Glacial Maximum, both bears were joined by dire wolves, coyotes, jaguars, snowshoe hare, groundhogs and beavers at Bat Cave, which also records thousands of Platygonus remains. These fauna inhabited well-watered forest-grassland ecotone with a strong taiga influence, although the region did occasionally cycle through drier, grassier periods. These open woodlands were dominated by pines and spruce, and to a lesser extent by oaks. Additional finds have been recovered from Oklahoma.

==== Eastern North America ====
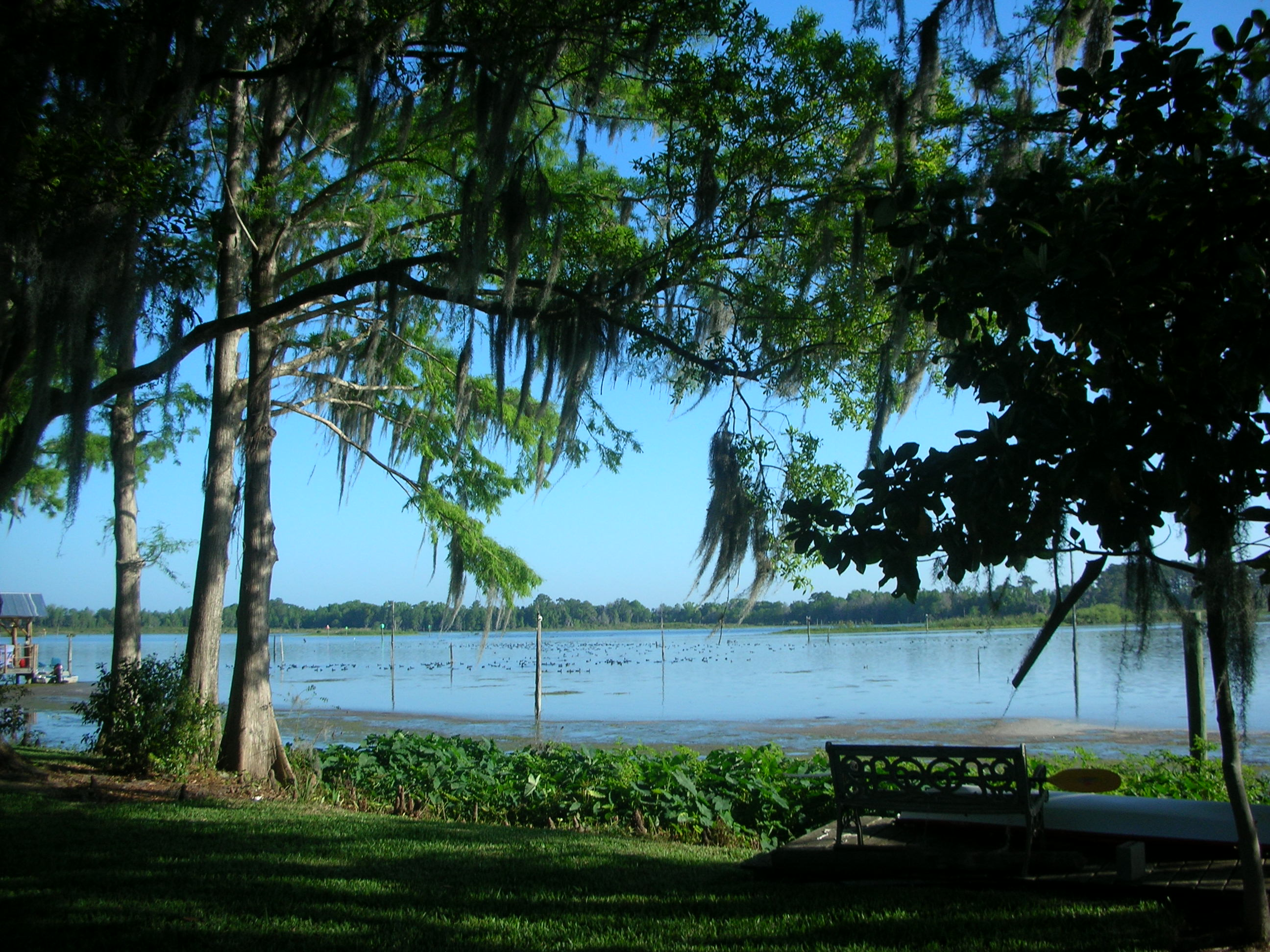
Lake Rousseau, Florida, is the south-easternmost locality which Arctodus simus is known to have inhabited.

Compared to other regions, Arctodus simus was relatively rare in eastern North America. To the north, the Appalachian Highlands were dominated by taiga. Post-LGM Saltville, Virginia, was a mosaic of grassy/herb laden open areas intermixed with open canopy boreal woodlands (oaks, pines, spruce, birch, firs) and marshes. Inhabiting in this C_{3} resource dominated environment were Arctodus simus, mastodon, (southernmost) woolly mammoths, Bootherium, horses, caribou, Megalonyx, dire wolves, beavers, Cervalces, and a variety of warm-adapted reptiles, suggesting a more mesic and less seasonal climate than today. Heavy bone damage on a mammoth carcass by both dire wolves and Arctodus suggests a potentially competitive scavenging relationship. Beyond Virginia, additional remains have been found in Pennsylvania.

To the south, the subtropical Atlantic Plains covered a great expanse of lowland, from the open deciduous woodlands of the Atlantic coast, to the semi-arid woodland/scrub of Florida, to the spruce-fir conifer forests and open habitat of the Gulf Coastal Plain. Although scarce, this contrast of habitats highlights the adaptability of Arctodus simus. At the Rainbow River and Lake Rousseau localities in Rancholabrean Florida, three Arctodus simus specimens have been recovered, alongside Smilodon, dire wolves, jaguars, ground sloths (Megalonyx, Paramylodon), llamas (Hemiauchenia, Palaeolama), Vero's tapir, giant beaver, capybara, Holmesina, horses, Bison antiquus, mastodon, Columbian mammoths and T. floridanus, in a climate similar to today's. Furthermore, the abundance of black bears, and particularly T. floridanus in Florida, has led to a theorized niche partitioning of ursids in Florida, with T. floridanus being herbivorous, and black bears and A. simus being omnivorous, with Arctodus being possibly more inclined towards carnivory. Additional finds of south-eastern A. simus are from Alabama, Arkansas, Mississippi, South Carolina, and Texas.

==== Beringia ====
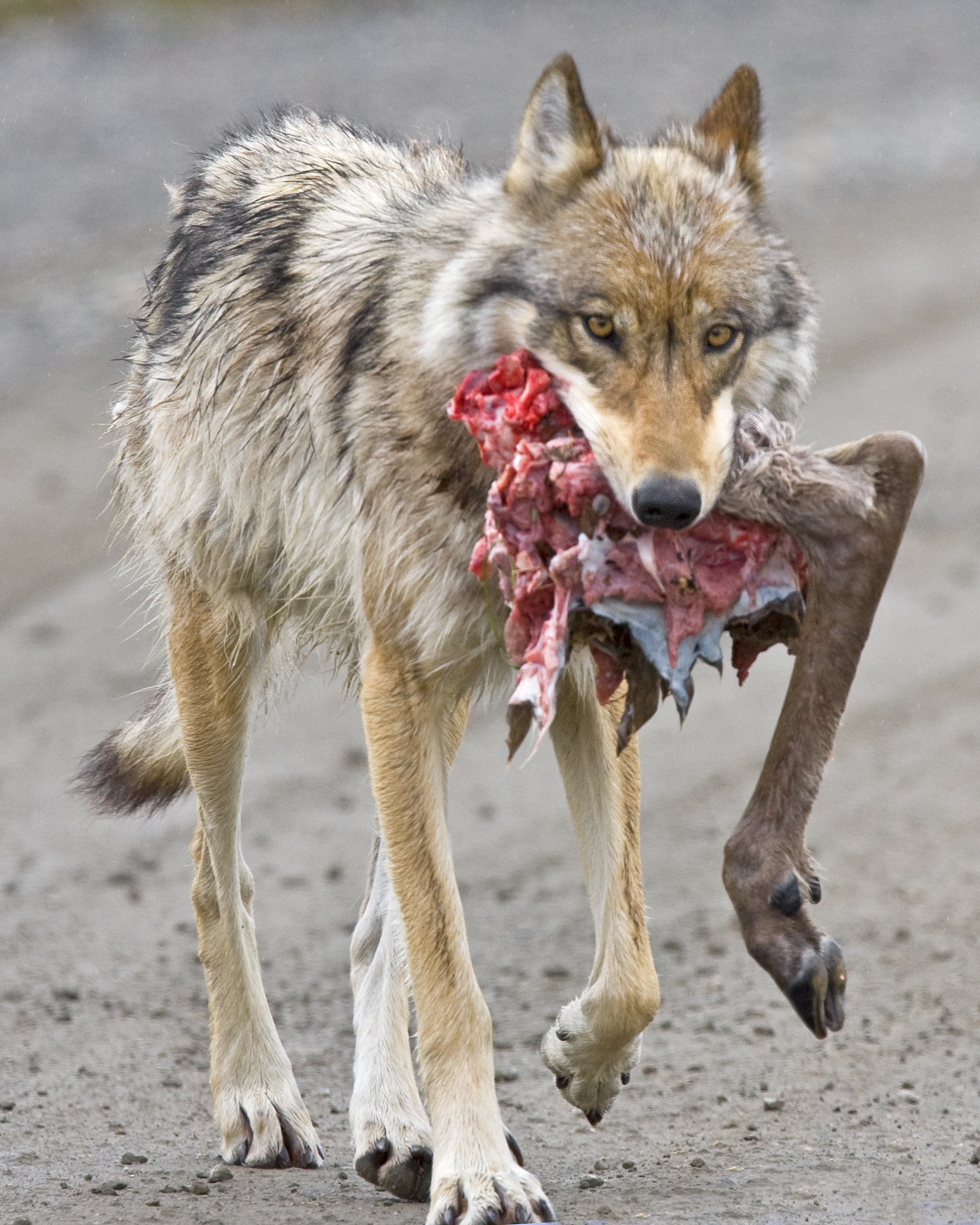
Arctodus is suggested to have had a kleptoparasitic relationship with Beringian wolves, akin to modern wolves and brown bears.

Mostly isolated from the rest of North America, eastern Beringia (Alaska and the Yukon) was largely an extension of the mostly open and treeless Eurasian mammoth steppe, supporting a unique assemblage of fauna. Currently, all specimens of A. simus in Beringia have been dated to a 27,000 year window (50,000 BP - 23,000 BP) from eastern Beringia, while additional undated remains may be of Sangamonian age. Unlike contemporary Beringian carnivorans, A. simus apparently never inhabited western Beringia (and therefore Asia). The largest known skull of A. simus was recovered from the Yukon, and may represent the largest specimen known.

A. simus is suggested to have been more carnivorous in Beringia than the rest of North America, in part due to elevated levels of nitrogen-15 recovered from specimens. Increased carnivory may be due to a lower proportion of competitors and probably a lower availability of carbohydrate-rich food supplies across the year in the far northern latitudes. No evidence of the carbohydrate-related dental pathologies have been found in Beringian A. simus. However, few specimens exist, and seeds have been recovered from A. simus scat from the Yukon. Survival during the cold season for some northern populations of A. simus could have depended on the regular scavenging of ungulate carcasses, as is the case with Alaskan brown bears.

The North Slope of Alaska <40,000 BP (Ikpikpuk and Titaluk rivers) preserves an upland and floodplain environment, with horses, bison then caribou being the most populous herbivores, and woolly mammoths, muskox, elk and saiga antelope more scarce. Cave lions, bears (Ursus arctos and Arctodus simus), and Beringian wolves made up the megafaunal predator guild. Isotope data implies that caribou and muskox were principal components of the carnivorous portion of A. simus' Arctic diet, suggesting that the warmer, wetter vegetation on the margins of the dry mammoth steppe (similar to the moist acidic tundra vegetation which dominates today) was the preferred habitat of Arctodus in Beringia. Ultimately, an opportunistic foraging strategy including up to 50% vegetation, and the meat of reindeer, muskox, carrion, and possibly some predators, is consistent with the isotopic data and the conclusions of the ecomorphological studies.

The co-ecologies of brown bears and A. simus in Beringia has also been examined. Isotope values in numerous Beringian Arctodus simus specimens suggests A. simus usually occupied a higher trophic level compared with invading brown bears. While the diet of Beringian brown bears was diverse (with some individuals consuming salmon), the data suggests that only terrestrial sources of meat were important for Beringian Arctodus. Researchers drew parallels with modern brown bears and American black bears. Where they overlap, black bears take the lower trophic niche, with lower population densities, much smaller territorial ranges, and seasonal migrations.

Additionally, upon the flooding of the Bering Strait and expansion of moist tundra and peatlands in eastern Beringia during MIS-3, brown bears and Homotherium went regionally extinct ~35,000 BP, whereas wolves and Arctodus persisted. Simultaneously, most megafaunal herbivores in Beringia experienced population bottlenecks. This restriction of prey and habitat could explain the extinctions. However, brown bears appear in MIS-2 circa the extinction of Arctodus in a re-emerged Beringia ~23,000 BP, opening up the possibility that some level of competition was at play. The idea that Arctodus had a kleptoparasitic relationship with wolves and Homotherium in Beringia has been explored, with the additional possibility that Arctodus successfully competed against brown bears and Homotherium for access to caribou pre-LGM. The lack of Arctodus in Siberia and cave hyena in North America may be due to competitive exclusion, however many other fauna did not cross the Rancholabrean Beringian gap, such as the American badger, Bootherium and the woolly rhino.

The local extinction of Arctodus in Beringia ~23,000 BP (possibly due to sharp climatic cooling associated with Heinrich event-2), was much earlier than in other parts of its range. While recolonized by cave lions and brown bears from Eurasia, Arctodus did not repopulate Beringia once the ice-free corridor to the south re-opened later in the Pleistocene. When brown bears recolonized Beringia ~23,000 BP, they had more carnivorous diets than their Beringian kin pre ~34,000 BP. This bolsters the idea that these bears competed for similar resources and niches.

== Map of fossil localities ==
Interactive distribution map of Arctodus (hover over dots for locality information)

Legend: Blancan faunal stage & Irvingtonian faunal stage A. pristinus (2.58 million - 300,000 BP?)

Irvingtonian faunal stage A.simus (1.8 million? - 250,000 BP)

Rancholabrean faunal stage A. simus (190,000 BP - 12,800 BP)

Radiocarbon dated A.simus (14C Date (1σ), ≤50,000 BP)

== Relationships with other bears ==
=== Arctodus pristinus ===
In the Early Pleistocene, Arctodus pristinus was much more populous in the south-east of North America, whereas the black bear was more common in the north-east. The black bear has inhabited North America since at least the Middle Pleistocene, while Tremarctos floridanus, a tremarctine bear inhabiting western North America at the time, is very similar to A. pristinus in terms of size, skeletal anatomy, and dietary preferences.

Despite this, generally speaking large tremarctine fossils from the Early and Middle Pleistocene of Florida are considered to be A. pristinus, whereas those from the Late Pleistocene of Florida are considered to be T. floridanus. Indeed, black bears and T. floridanus are believed to have only colonized Florida with the extinction of A. pristinus (both of which only appear in Florida in the Late Pleistocene), however, T. floridanus could yet still be found from older sites in Florida. T. floridanus was possibly an ecological replacement of A. pristinus, with T. floridanus finds being widespread in Rancholabrean Florida and the wider southeastern United States.

=== Arctodus simus ===
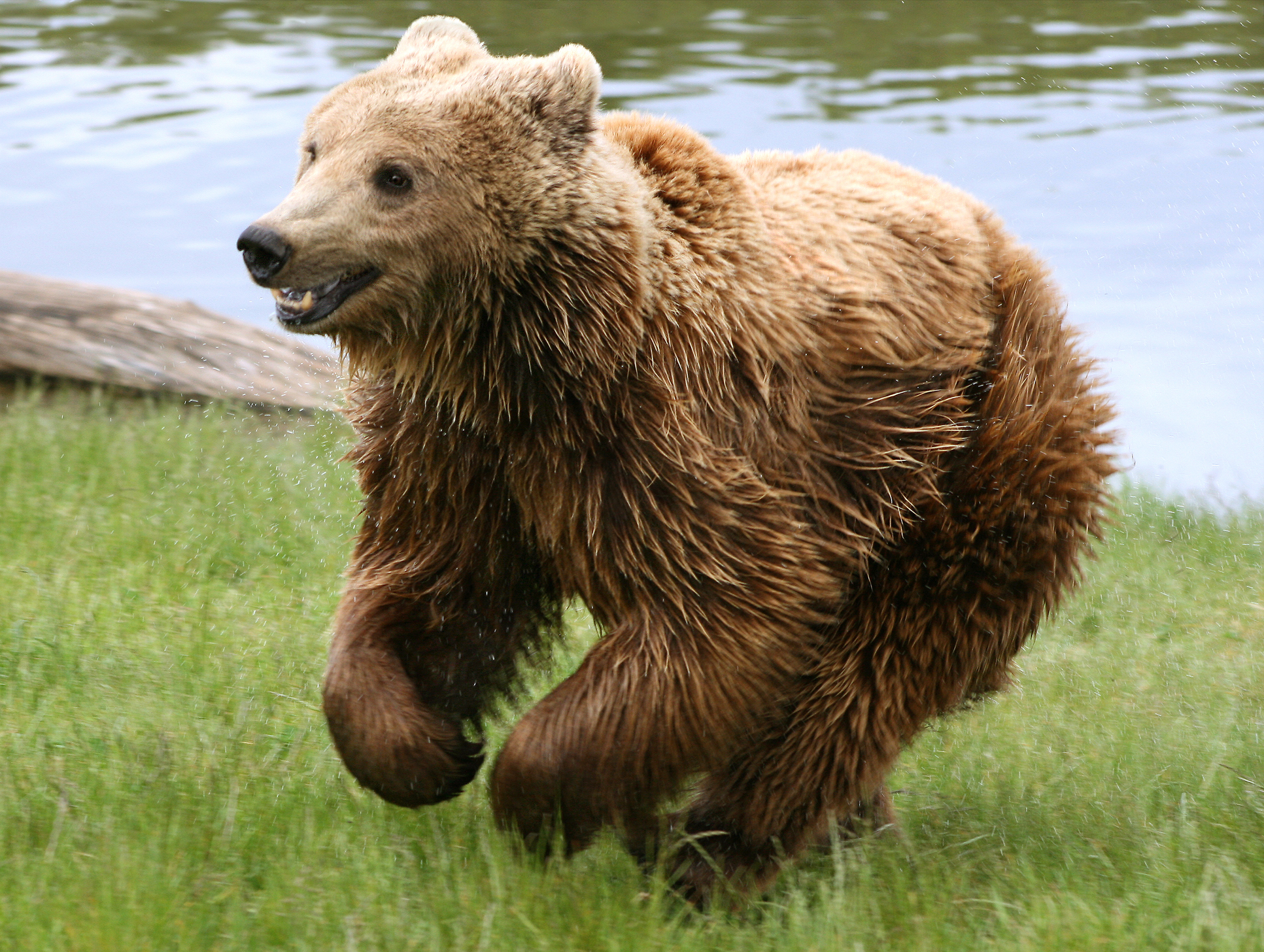
The brown bear was a direct competitor of Arctodus simus.

The most commonly accepted ecological parallel of Arctodus simus in scientific literature is the brown bear. Both brown bears and A. simus exhibit a high degree of dietary variability, and while largely herbivorous, meat can be an important dietary element to certain populations of both species. Additionally, the potential of habitual kleptoparasitism is often noted in Arctodus, with brown bears being opportunistic, curious, and regularly stealing kills from smaller predators. One past theory behind the extinction of A. simus is that A. simus may have been out-competed by brown bears as the latter expanded southwards from eastern Beringia ~13,000 BP, and gradually established itself in North America.

However this has been refuted as new dates establish an extended coexistence, with some isolated A. simus remains being re-evaluated as brown bears. Brown bears (along with lions, bison and red foxes) first emigrated to North America via Beringia during the Illinoian Glaciation, with brown bears first arriving between ~177,000 BP and ~111,000 BP in eastern Beringia. Genetic divergences suggest brown bears first migrated south during MIS-5 (~92,000 - 83,000 BP) upon the opening of the ice-free corridor, with the first fossils being near Edmonton (26,000 BP). On a continent-wide scale, although the brown bear and A. simus were sympatric at times as brown bears spread into North America, A. simus may typically have dominated competitive interactions, and displaced brown bears from specific localities. For example, brown bear at the La Brea Tar Pits only postdate Arctodus. Additionally, Arctodus' prolonged co-existence with black bears may have put significant constraints on the black bear's evolution.

At the end of the Pleistocene, one reason brown bears persisted where Arctodus simus went extinct was because Arctodus may have been less flexible in adapting to new and rapidly changing environments that impacted the availability or quality of food and habitat. Brown bears and Arctodus have been discovered together in Alaska (then Beringia) between 50,000 BP and 34,000 BP, and in later Pleistocene deposits in California, Nevada, Vancouver Island, and Wyoming.

=== Convergent evolution ===
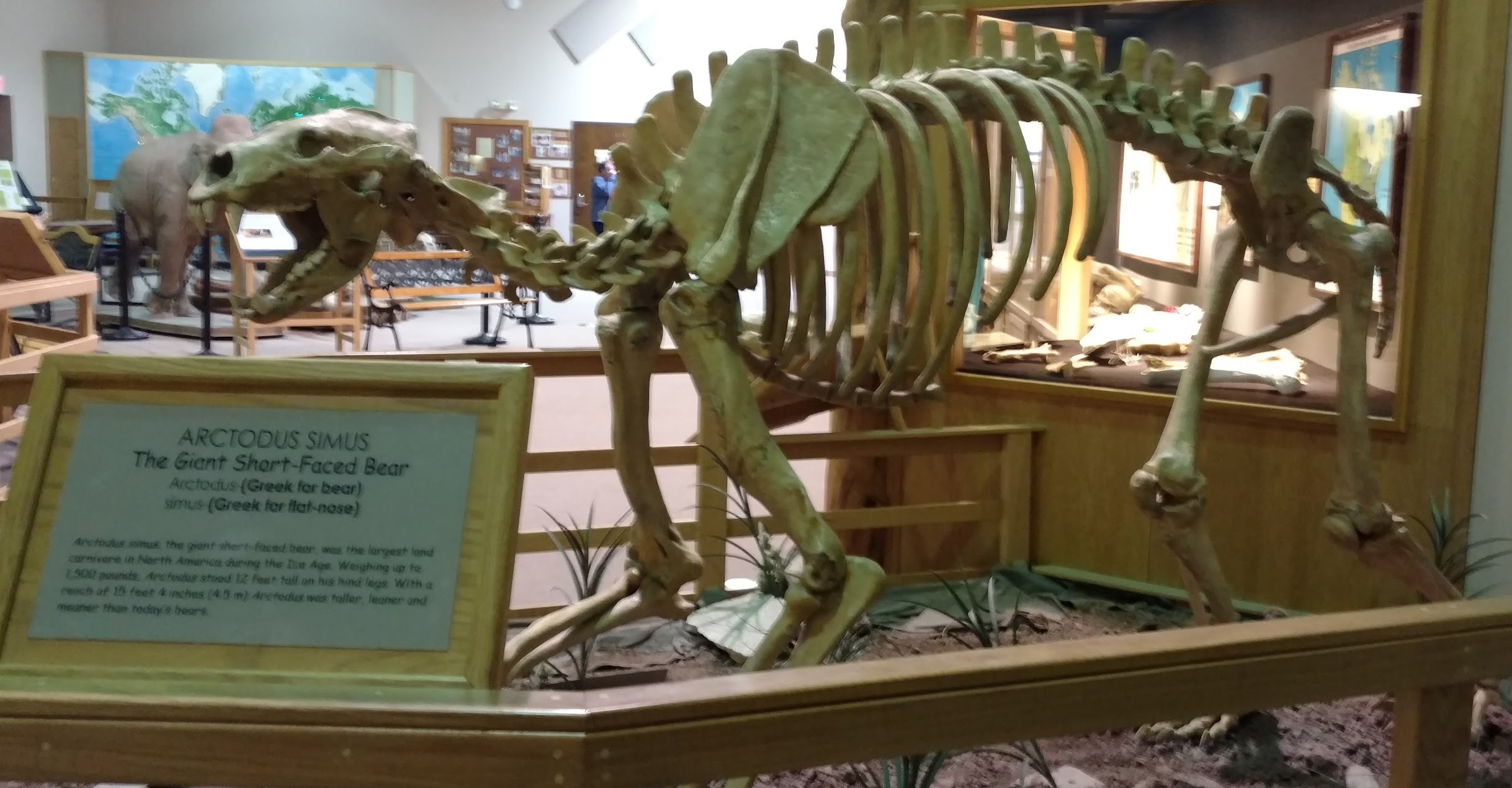
Arctodus simus reconstruction at the Hot Springs Mammoth Site, South Dakota.

While both Arctodus and Arctotherium may have convergently evolved huge body sizes, their inverse evolutionary trends towards body size during the Pleistocene suggests different selective pressures between North American and South American ecosystems. Additionally, there are notable differences between the giant short-faced bears Arctodus simus and Arctotherium angustidens. Not only did Arctotherium angustidens reach a higher maximum weight (an exceptional specimen was calculated at ~1,670 kilograms (3,680 lb)), A. angustidens was a much more robust animal, in contrast with the gracile Arctodus simus. Excluding the exceptional specimen, Arctotherium angustidens had been calculated to a weight range between 1,200 kilograms (2,600 lb) and 412 kilograms (908 lb), with the largest specimens of either species being said to be comparable to one another. Massive body size appears to be less frequent in A. simus than in A. angustidens.

Arctodus simus has also been suggested to share ecomorphological convergences with other extinct bears (Arctotherium bonariense, Agriotherium africanum, and Huracan). Together with great size, these species converged on several adaptations, including a skull with a short broad rostrum, premasseteric fossa on the mandible, possible Carnassial shears (P4 and m1), and long limbs (relative to body length). Additionally, an analysis of the elbow joint of an indeterminate Arctodus specimen and several Arctotherium species suggested a mutual preference for mixed habitats. However, while Agriotherium and Huracan have definitive adaptions for meat-heavy diets stemming from a running, predatory lifestyle, Arctodus simus lacks similar adaptations beyond proportionally longer limbs.

== Interactions with humans ==
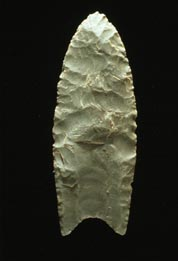
The Clovis people are the first known culture to have interacted with Arctodus.

=== Exploitation ===
Several A. simus remains document evidence of consumption by humans. The most famous example comes from Lubbock Lake Landmark, Texas. An Arctodus simus was processed for subsistence (butchery marks indicated skinning, de-fleshing and disarticulation) and tool production by Clovis people, much in the same way as a mammoth carcass (~13,000 BP / 11,100 ^{14}C BP ). Additional remains of consumed A. simus include a charred A. simus footbone fragment recovered from Spalding, Idaho, along with A. simus hair in a cooking pit from Pendejo Cave, New Mexico. Other remains of A. simus have been found in association with Paleo-Indian artifacts in Sheriden Cave, Ohio, and Huntington Dam, Utah. The direct relationship between humans and some associated Arctodus remains has been occasionally debated.

=== Competition ===
Human hunting and butchery of large megafauna, particularly mammoths and mastodon, would likely have put people in competition with A. simus. Defense against these large bears and the abandonment of carcasses are plausible outcomes, along with the possible caching and disposal of carcass remains underwater to mask its odor from Arctodus. Co-existence in Chiquihuite cave, Zacatecas also suggests potential competition between A. simus and humans for shelter.

==== Migration barrier hypothesis ====
In the late 1980s, Val Geist hypothesized that "specialist, aggressive, competitive Rancholabrean fauna" such as Arctodus simus were a barrier for humans (along with other Siberian megafauna such as moose, grey wolves and brown bears) when migrating into North America (both Beringia and below the ice sheets). Male A. simus were the largest and most powerful carnivorous land mammals in North America, with the potential specialization in obtaining and dominating distant and scarce resources. Humans in this hypothesis, though familiar with brown bears, would not have been able to avoid predation or effectively compete with A. simus and other large Pleistocene North American carnivores, making human expansion difficult in Beringia and impossible south of the ice sheets.

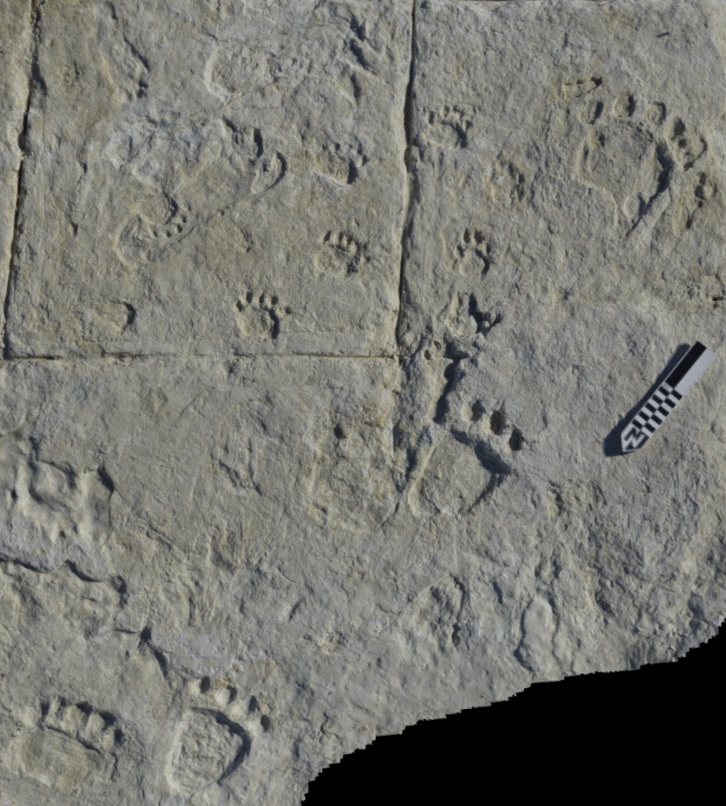
Human footprints intersecting the pawprints of an A. simus family (White Sands, New Mexico).

However, this theory has never been accepted by anthropologists. Paul Matheus argues that there were negligible ecological differences across the mammoth steppe, and that humans successfully competed against and even hunted territorial cave bears, cave hyenas, cave lions, leopards, tigers and wolves in Eurasia before reaching eastern Beringia, making the solitary Arctodus an unlikely impediment to expansion. Indeed, both humans and A. simus are first dated to ~50,000 BP in Beringia, both from sites in the Yukon, and co-existed until A. simus went extinct in Beringia ~23,000 BP during the Last Glacial Maximum. This co-existence continued despite the regional extinction of other Beringian predators such as cave lions, brown bears and scimitar-tooth cats.

The human colonization of North America south of the ice sheets further disproves the idea that Arctodus was a migration barrier. The earliest universally accepted pre-Clovis site south of Beringia are the White Sands footprints in New Mexico, with the earliest being dated to ~22,000 cal. BP. Trackways from multiple A. simus and humans recovered from the White Sands National Park appear to intersect with one another; as these prints are among the more recent trace fossils at the site, these trackways demonstrate humans co-existed alongside A. simus and other megafauna in southern North America for thousands of years. Further studies affirm that humans proliferated in the Late Pleistocene of North America for more than ten thousand years, with humans being definitively widespread across the Americas by at least 15,000 BP.

=== Oral traditions ===
Stories of giant bears present in the oral traditions of the Haudenosaunee, Lakota and Ojibwe may be potential cultural memories of interactions between humans and A. simus, however stories of Katshituashku ("stiff-legged bear") amongst broader eastern Algonquian peoples may not represent links to extinct megafauna.

== Extinction ==
=== Arctodus pristinus ===
Arctodus pristinus went extinct in the Middle Pleistocene (300,000 years ago), being last recorded from the Coleman 2A site, Florida. The evolution of Arctodus simus, competition with Tremarctos floridanus and black bears, and possibly the transitioning of Pleistocene Florida from a hot, wet, densely forested habitat to a still hot, but drier and much more open biome are thought to be factors behind the gradual disappearance of A. pristinus in the late Irvingtonian faunal stage. There are dubious records of A. pristinus in South Carolina and California from the Late Pleistocene, however these are heavily disputed. Additional Late Pleistocene sites have been recorded from Tequixquiac and the Valsequillo Basin of Mexico. However, most research establishes A. pristinus as existing between the Pliocene-Pleistocene boundary and the Middle Pleistocene.

=== Arctodus simus ===
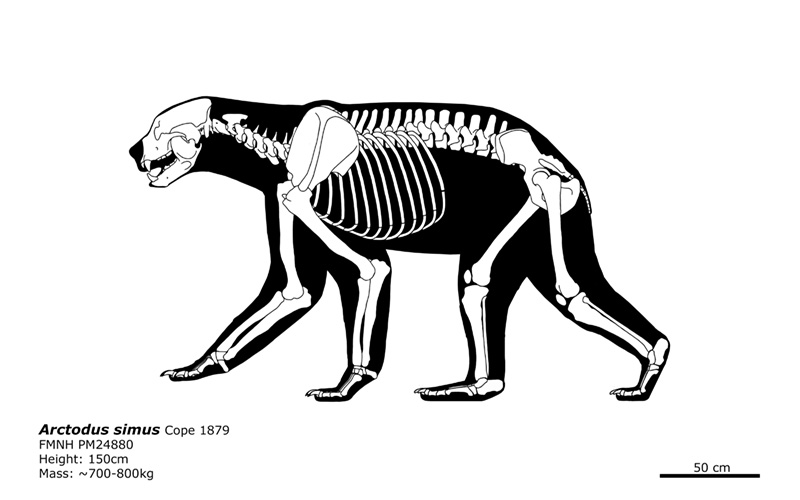
Skeletal reconstruction of Arctodus simus.

With the extinction of Arctodus pristinus, A. simus became the final representative of the genus. A simus went extinct around 12,800 years ago, and is one of the most recently dated megafauna to go extinct in North America, being reliably dated to within the Pleistocene-Holocene boundary (13,800 BP - 11,400 BP). A. simus is one of 9 species which represent over 85% of dated megafaunal remains between 20,000 and 10,000 years ago. Both local and regionalized dietary flexibility has been a factor suggested for the species' longevity.

Various factors, including the depletion in number of large herbivores, the diminishing nutritional quality of plants during climate change, and competition with fellow omnivores (humans and brown bears) for food resources, have been suggested as the cause of Arctodus simus' extinction. However, multiple studies put doubt on brown bears being culpable in A. simus' extinction, with the brown bear being more of an ecological replacement that was more adaptable to change. Moreover, there is no systematic evidence that humans hunted large extinct Pleistocene carnivores in North America, and no clear indication of direct human involvement in the extinction of A. simus. Additionally, dental wear evidence from Rancho La Brea does not suggest that food shortages were to blame for the demise of large bodied carnivorans such as A. simus.

==== Climate change ====
Of the factors discussed, vegetation shifts in the latest Pleistocene may have been particularly unfavorable for Arctodus simus, due to a reduction of quality foraging for subsistence. For example, on Vancouver Island (~13,500 BP), vegetation changed rapidly from open woodlands with abundant lodgepole pine to increasingly closed forests with shade-tolerant spruce, mountain hemlock, and red alder. These changes, effective by ~12,450 BP, point toward cool and moist conditions during the Younger Dryas stadial. Closed forests continued to expand in the early Holocene. Even though A. simus was not restricted to open areas and could inhabit in different environments, the timing of the regional shift from an open pine woodland habitat to a densely forested vegetation implies that these vegetation changes contributed to the local extinction of A. simus, along with many other megafauna.

==== Low genetic diversity ====
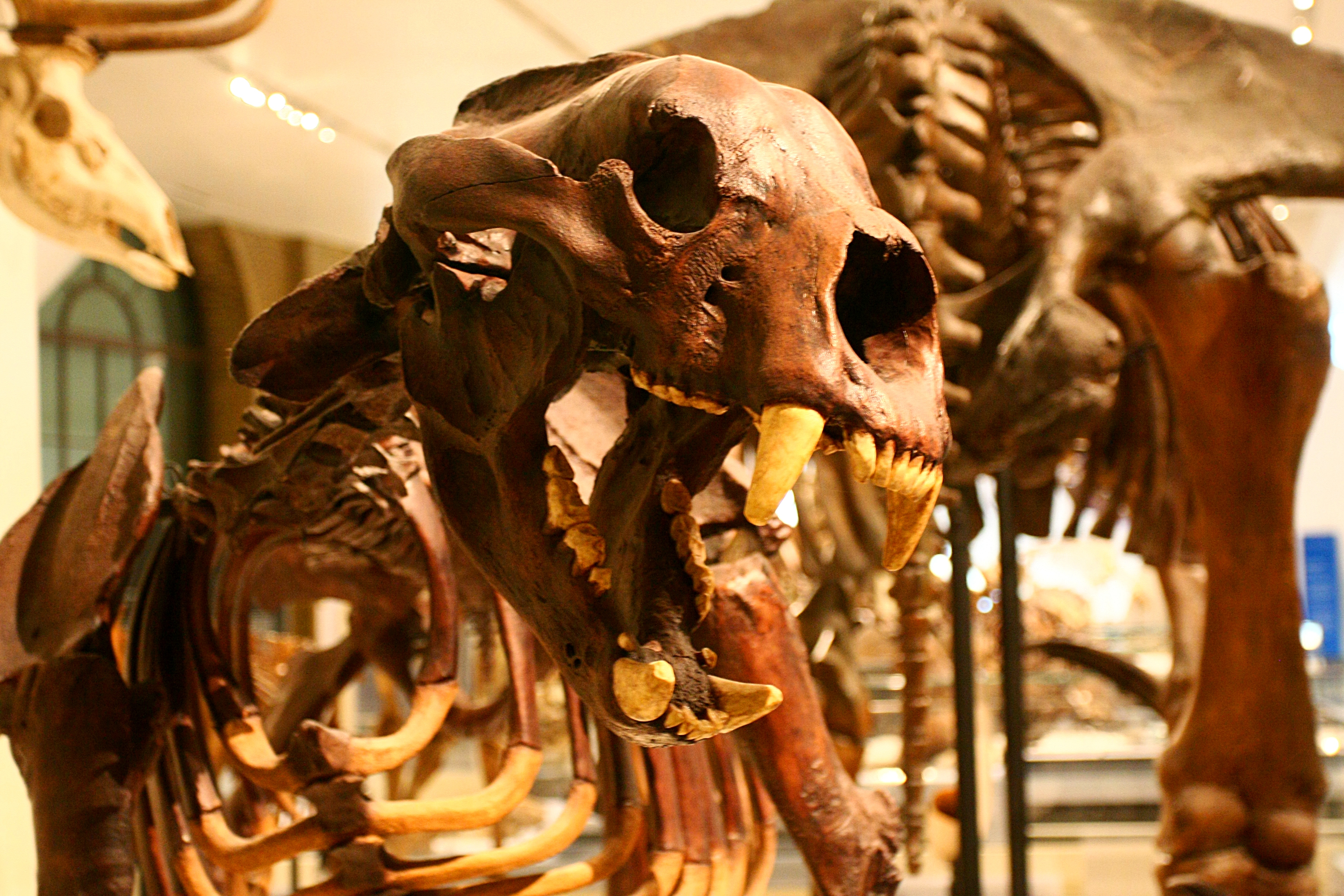
Low genetic diversity could have hastened Arctodus' extinction.

A. simus had a low level of genetic diversity from most sampled specimens, with a genetic study suggesting an extended history of low effective population size. A loss and/or replacement of mitochondrial DNA lineages before the Last Glacial Maximum, and decrease in population size from a previously genetically diverse population, has been noted in a variety of Eurasian and American Late Pleistocene megafauna. That the southern specimens were very closely related to Beringian specimens may further support this idea, as these populations had been isolated from before the Last Glacial Maximum (last common ancestor - 31,500 BP).

A lack of genetic diversity has been attributed to a reduced ability to adapt to environmental conditions. Small population sizes may be characteristic of tremarctine bears- the spectacled bear, while having low levels of genetic diversity, has no signs of a recent genetic bottleneck. However, brown bears had diverse, sympatric source populations in Eurasia, with a high genetic (mitochondrial) diversity of Beringian brown bears in contrast with Beringian A. simus. This contrast in genetic diversity may also suggest that while female brown bears have a permanent home range, female A. simus may not have. If Arctodus simus experienced genetic bottlenecks or local extinctions prior to the Last Glacial Maximum, A. simus would have been unable to supplement their reduced genetic diversity with new migrants like the brown bear could, making them vulnerable to extinction.

==== Overkill hypothesis ====
A 2025 study found that diurnality and a high basal metabolic rate (BMR) were traits reliably shared amongst extinct Pleistocene carnivorans, with A. simus having the highest BMR of all the studied fauna. As both these extinct predators and humans primarily operated during daylight hours and required intensive foraging to sustain their energy demands, these predators would have disproportionately increased exposure to human competition, and a reduced resilience to even moderate hunting pressure during the Pleistocene.

==== Last dates ====
The youngest date for A. simus is circa 12,700 BP from Friesenhahn Cave, Texas, calibrated from 10,814 ± 55 radiocarbon years (^{14}C BP). However, this date should be viewed with caution, as analyses suggest the collagen protein was degraded. A vertebra from Bonner Springs, Kansas, was dated to ca. 12,800 BP (based on 10,921 ± 50 radiocarbon years) from well preserved collagen. However, the same vertebra was previously assigned a younger date of ca. 10,980 BP (9,630 ± 60 radiocarbon years) from a different laboratory, which widens the possible age of this vertebra to between 9,510 and 11,021 ^{14}C BP (at 2σ). Nevertheless, a specimen from Huntington Dam, Utah was also dated to ca. 12,800 BP from two radiocarbon dates (10,870 ± 75 & 10,976 ± 40 ^{14}C BP) and is therefore considered reliable.

== History of research ==
=== Subspecies hypothesis ===
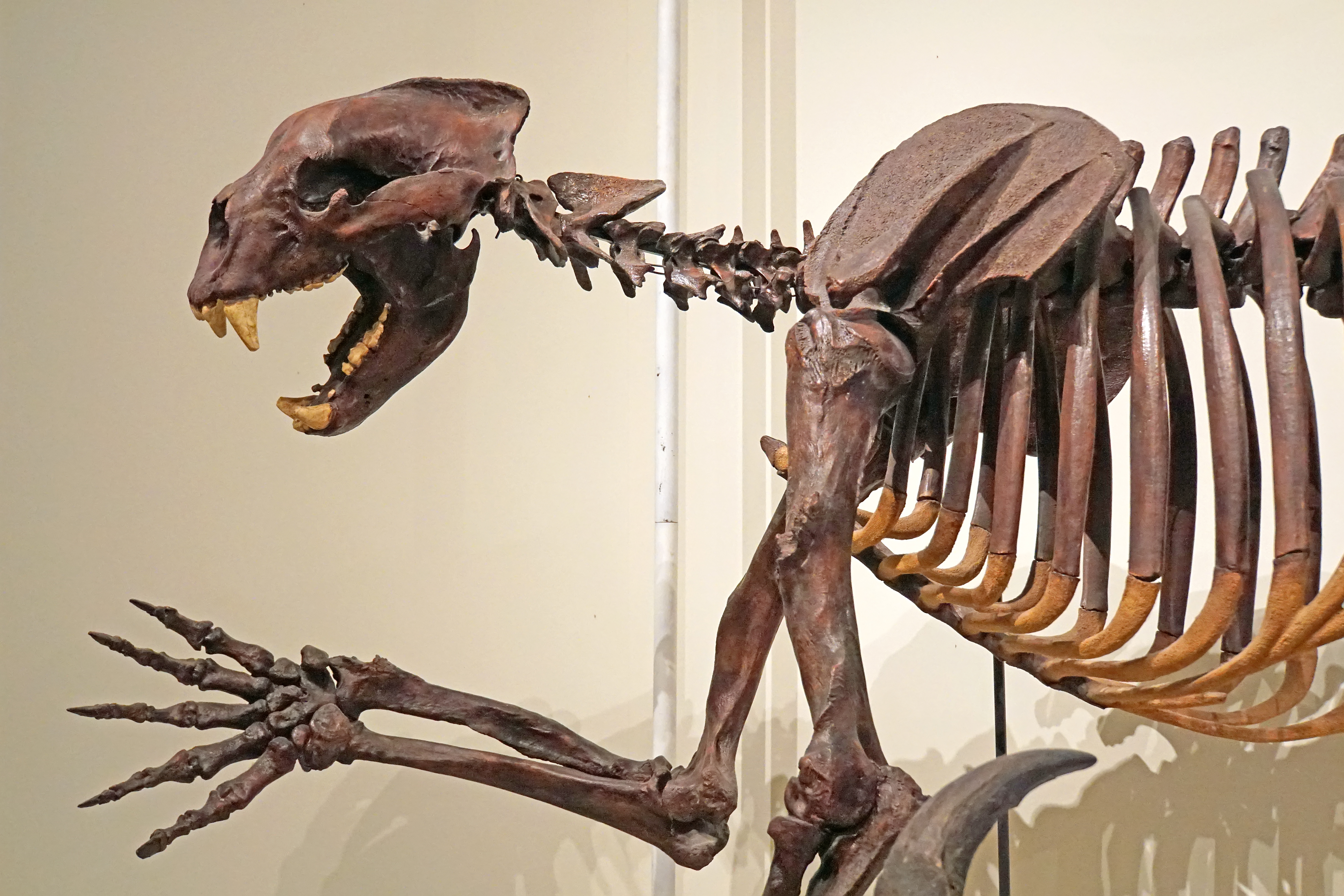
Skeletal reconstruction of Arctodus simus at the Royal Ontario Museum, Toronto.

Size differences between specimens of Arctodus simus (such as skull and long bone dimensions) led Kurtén in 1967 to propose two forms; a larger subspecies emerged in the Irvingtonian (A. s. yukonensis), which was then displaced in the south by a smaller subspecies (A. s. simus) during the Rancholabrean epoch. An additional subspecies (A. s. nebrascensis) was described by Childs Frick. Other theories, such as the sexual dimorphism and individual variation known from Tremarctine bears, potential ecomorphs, and the overall lack of finds were additional factors used to explain the significant variation in Arctodus.

However, sexual dimorphism has already been noted in A. pristinus, and has been historically described in A. simus since the early 20th century. Furthermore, the presence of very large southern A. simus specimens (in California, Florida, and New Mexico) and notably small northern specimens (Yukon and Vancouver Island) already put doubt on this designation, with the low number of specimens and sex-biased sampling potentially leading to perceived ecomorphologies. For example, none of the specimens assigned to the larger morph (A. s. yukonensis) is from a cave passage, being usually isolated remains from open sites. Furthermore, over 70% of the smaller specimens (once assigned as the A. s. simus subspecies) are from cave deposits where bacula (penis bones) would likely be found if present, suggesting that mostly female individuals of A. simus were using caves. The only baculum currently known from A. simus may belong to a black bear (Potter Cave), while DNA evidence currently only affirms female specimens as having been recovered from caves. Sexual dimorphism also explained why Arctodus teeth (from multiple individuals at the same site) generally clustered into two sizes. While Rancho La Brea (the locality with the highest number of A. simus specimens) is the only site to preserve both size classes, radiocarbon dates confirm both sizes coexisted temporally, and were therefore sexes. A 2025 mitochondrial DNA study found sexually dimorphic size classes and a uniform population from at least 31 individuals (derived from 28 deposits across the United States and Canada), further affirming sexual dimorphism in A. simus.

=== "Super predator" hypothesis ===
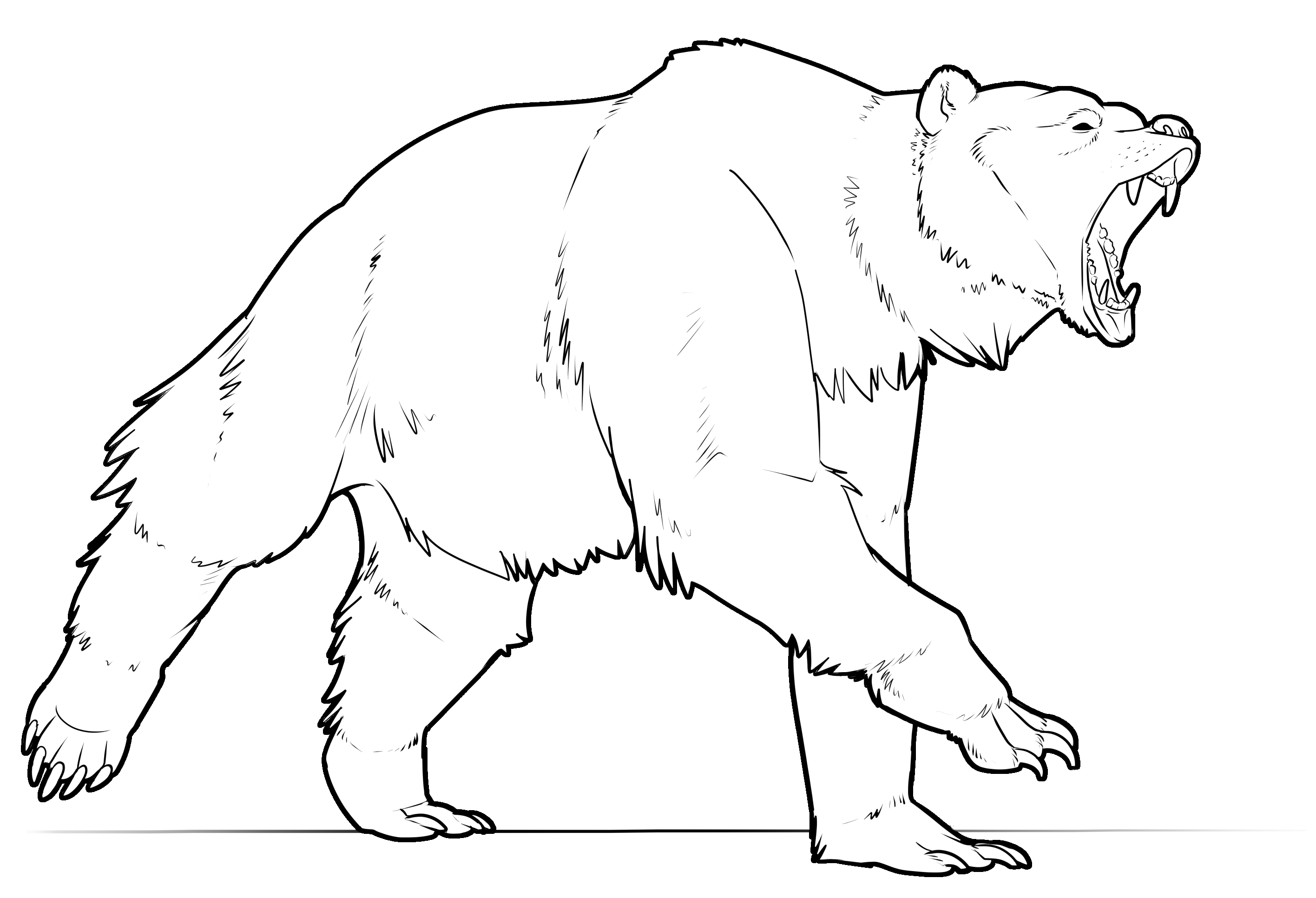
Life restoration of a running A. simus

One past proposal envisaged Arctodus simus as a brutish predator that overwhelmed very large but slow megafauna with its great physical strength. However, despite being very large, its limbs were too gracile for such an attack strategy, significantly more gracile than Arctotherium angustidens at that.

Due to their long legs, an alternative hypothesis suggested by Björn Kurtén is that it may have hunted by running down Pleistocene herbivores such as wild horses and saiga antelopes, an idea that at one time earned it the name "running bear". However, during pursuit of speedy game animals, the bear's sheer physical mass, inflexible spine and plantigrade gait would be a handicap; modern brown bears can run at the same speed but quickly tire and cannot keep up a chase for long. Correspondingly, although a 700 kg (1,500 lb) Arctodus may have been able to reach a maximum speed of 51 kilometres per hour (32 mph), all modern bears have maximum speeds significantly lower than mass-based calculations for speed. As a result, paleontologist Paul Matheus suggests that Arctodus' top speed was 40–45 km/h (25–28 mph). Arctodus skeletons do not articulate in a way that would have allowed for quick turns – an ability required of any predator that survives by chasing down agile prey. Proportionally taller legs, a short trunk, proximally elongated limbs, a stride which had little to no unsupported intervals, small and laterally-orientated eyes, and proportionally short canines ill-suited for spinal and tracheal attacks further complicated ambush hunting as a lifestyle for Arctodus.

Furthermore, the lack of definitive predatory adaptions (such as the absence of laterally compressed canines, and carnassials built for crushing and grinding rather than shearing meat) puts doubt to any species-wide hyper-carnivorous interpretations of A. simus. The anatomical requirements for a large, cursorial, hyper-carnivorous bear are present in Huracan and Agriotherium, but not Arctodus. Adaptations for predatory behavior are highly divergent in ursids versus other carnivorans, with features such as a short rostrum and long carnassials not being indicative of a predatory lifestyle in Arctodus. Although the only living hyper-carnivorous ursid, the polar bear, also lacks carnassial shears, the species' specialization on small prey and reliance on blubber (rather than coarser flesh) invalidates this comparison with Arctodus. However, both Arctodus simus and polar bears may have had similar overall limb proportions. Regardless, carnivory was likely limited to the regular scavenging of carcasses and opportunistic hunting, as is the case with the modern brown bear.

=== Specialist kleptoparasite vs Omnivore ===
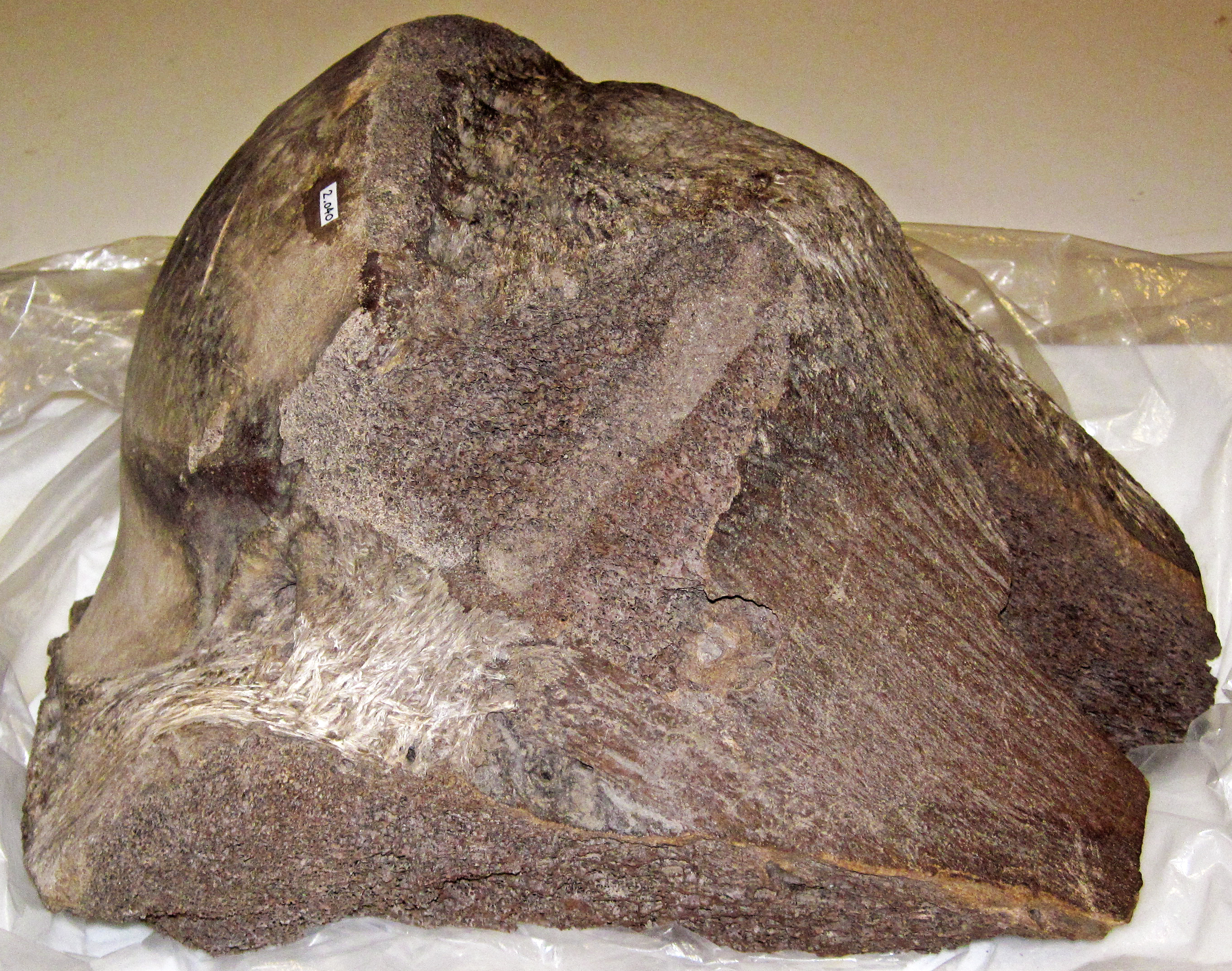
Mastodon arm bone from the Snowmastodon site with predator damage at the Denver Museum of Nature & Science in Denver, Colorado.

The idea that Arctodus simus was an obligate kleptoparasite was most notably proposed by Paul Matheus. Under this model, A. simus was ill-equipped to be an active predator, having evolved as a specialized scavenger adapted to cover an extremely large home range in order to seek out broadly and unevenly distributed mega-mammal carcasses. There would have been additional selective pressure for increased body size, so that Arctodus could procure and defend carcasses from other large carnivores, some of which were gregarious, or chase them from their kills and steal their food. Matheus calculated that with a hyper-carnivorous diet, a 700 kg (1,500 lb) Beringian Arctodus would need to consume ~5,853 kilograms (12,904 lb) of meat per year- the equivalent of 12 bison, 44.6 horses, or 2 woolly mammoths (adjusted for the non-edible portions of the body). Therefore, Arctodus would have had to obtain 100 kg (220 lb) of flesh/edible carrion every 6.25 days (16 kg (35.3 lb) per day).

Furthermore, the short rostrum, resulting in increased out-forces of the jaw-closing muscles (temporalis and masseter), may have been an adaptation for cracking bones with their broad carnassials. Such use of the P4 and m1 teeth is supported by the heavy wear on these teeth in old individuals of Arctodus simus and Agriotherium (another giant bear). Additionally, strengthened tooth enamel in Arctodus may have evolved to crack bone. Moreover, at least in Beringia, the conservative growth strategies, long lives and low natural mortality rates of horses and mammoths should have provided somewhat evenly distributed carcasses throughout the year (unlike ruminants such as bison, whose mortality peaks in late winter to early spring).

==== Rebuttal ====
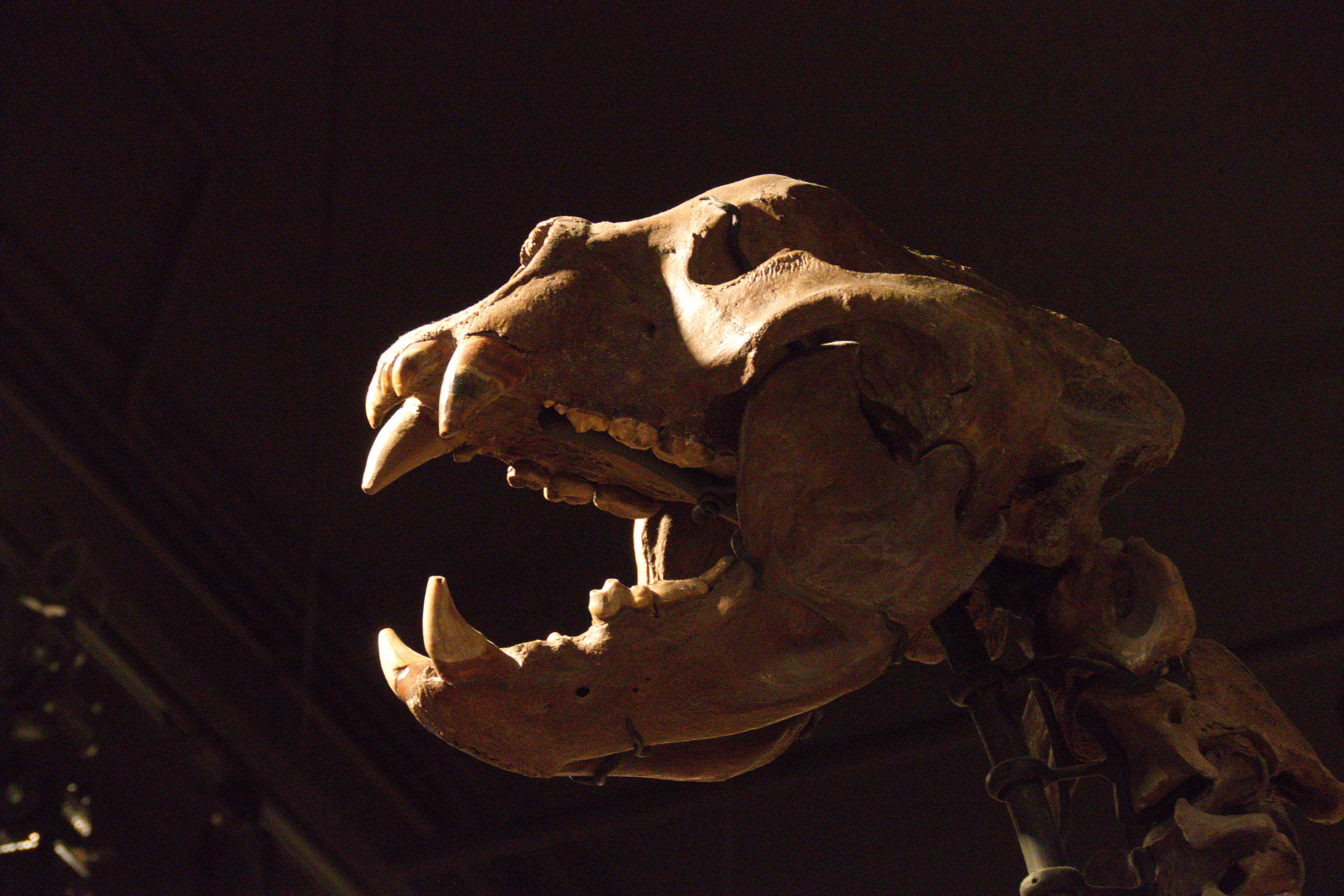
Clues from Arctodus' dentition, such as the absence of molar damage associated with processing bone, dental cavities, and the lack of specialization in the canines, discourages a hyper-carnivorous interpretation of Arctodus.

The kleptoparasite hypothesis has been repeatedly challenged. The short, broad rostrum of Arctodus is a characteristic also shared with the sun bear and the spectacled bear, which are both omnivorous. Specialized scavengers like hyenas show distinctive patterns of molar damage from cracking bones. Based on lack of "bone-cracking" wear in specimens from Rancho La Brea, researchers in 2013 concluded that A. simus was not a specialized scavenger. Of living bears, the population of A. simus from La Brea showed the most similar tooth wear patterns to its closest living relative, the spectacled bear, which can have a highly varied diet ranging from omnivory to almost pure herbivory.

Additionally, severe tooth crown fractures and alveolar infections were found in the South American giant short-faced bear (Arctotherium angustidens). These were interpreted as evidence of feeding on hard materials (e.g. bones), which could tentatively indicate for these bears the regular scavenging of ungulate carcasses obtained through kleptoparasitism. However, such dental pathologies were not observed in various specimens of A. simus, other than the strong wear facets of old individuals. Instead, recovered dental damage (incisor wear, dental calculus & cavities) is herbivorous in origin. Moreover, researchers reviewing links between canine breakage, microwear texture patterns and carnivorans from La Brea (along with further analyses on specimens from Tequixquiac) found that A. simus consumed foods softer yet tougher than black bears and polar bears, avoided hard/brittle foods such as bone, and reaffirmed affinities between A. simus and modern, omnivorous spectacled bears.

Furthermore, the relative lack of Arctodus remains at predator traps such as the La Brea Tar Pits, suggests that Arctodus did not regularly compete for carcasses. Although La Brea has produced more Arctodus simus specimens than any other site, Arctodus represents only 1% of all carnivorans in the pits. While more abundant than brown bears and black bears, Arctodus was calculated to its baseline continental abundance, contrasting with the overabundance of other large carnivorans. A similar rate (~0.9%) of relative abundance was calculated for Arctodus compared to other megafauna at the Natural Trap Cave in Wyoming by 1993. Additionally, isotope analyses of Beringian Arctodus specimens suggest that Arctodus had a low consumption rate of horses and mammoths in Beringia, despite those species making up ~50% of the available biomass in Beringia. Further evidence comes from the evolution of brain size relative to body size- bears with high caloric diets and which do not exhibit dormancy showed a weak but significant correlation with bigger relative brain size. Arctodus simus plotted in between the likely hypercarnivorous Cephalogale, and the almost exclusively herbivorous Eurasian cave bear and Indarctos, suggesting omnivory.

== See also ==
- Arctotherium
- Agriotherium
- Quaternary extinction event
