= Paleontology in Florida =

Paleontological research in the U.S. state of Florida

The location of the state of Florida

Florida has a very rich fossil record spanning from the Eocene to recent times. Florida fossils are often very well preserved. The oldest known fossils in Florida date back to the Eocene. At this time Florida was covered in a sea home to a variety of marine invertebrates and the primitive whales, such as Basilosaurus. During the later Miocene Florida was exposed as dry land again due to geologic uplift and mountain building. In the Florida Keys, however, coral reefs were forming. The marine environments of Pliocene Florida were home to creatures like dugongs, porpoises, sharks, and whales. On land, camels, dogs, horses, relatives of modern elephants, saber toothed cats, enteleodonts (hell pigs), and tapirs inhabited the state. The period of time best documented in the fossil record of Florida is the Pleistocene epoch. Among them were short-faced bears, saber-toothed cats, glyptodonts, mammoths, mastodons, giant ground sloths, and dire wolves. Florida's state paleontological repository is housed at the University of Florida's Florida Museum of Natural History.

== Prehistory ==
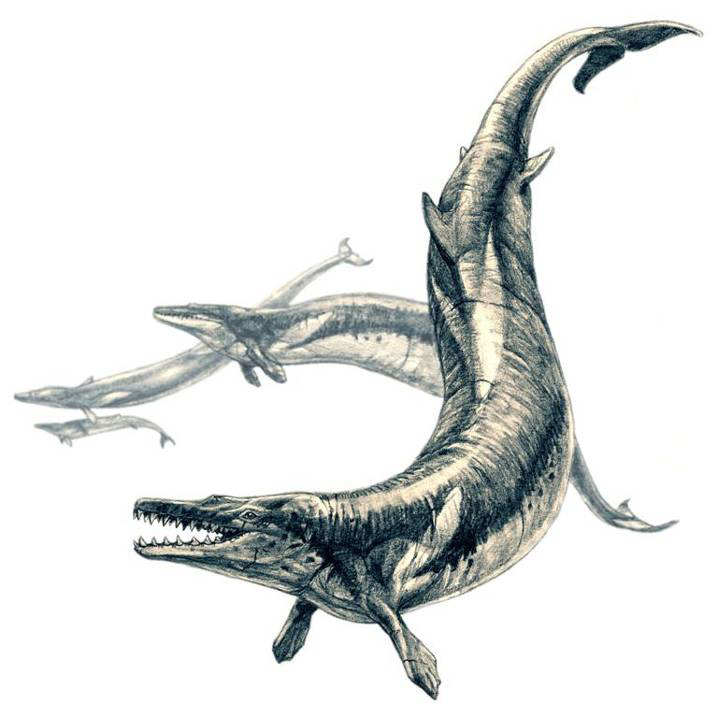
Reconstruction of Basilosaurus

Florida has a very rich fossil record. Its geologic history is also complex. The rock underlying Florida was originally part of Gondwana and did not become part of North America until the Permian, when Pangaea formed. During the Mesozoic Pangaea began to divide again and Florida was left attached to North America. However, no non-avian dinosaur fossils are known from the state though they likely lived there. In fact, no fossils are known from surface deposits older than the Eocene. However, in the 1950s, eurypterid fossils from the Silurian period were unearthed in Northern Florida. Trilobite fossils from the same time period have also been unearthed in Northern Florida. Nevertheless, the geologic record contributes to science's ability to reconstruct the history of Florida's changing Mesozoic environment. During the Cretaceous the Florida peninsula was much wider due to regions now submerged as continental shelf being exposed to the air. Later into the Cretaceous northern Florida was covered by rising seas connecting the Gulf of Mexico to the Atlantic. This passage of water was called the Suwannee Straits.

A shallow sea grew to cover most of the state during the Paleogene. Clams, echinoderms, and gastropods lived here. Cenozoic limestone formed in such environments is common in Florida and rich in fossils. The oldest fossil-bearing geologic deposits in Florida are of Eocene age. During the Eocene, primitive whales like Basilosaurus swam over Florida. Other inhabitants included large numbers of shelled invertebrates, sharks, and sirenians. Oligocene fossils in Florida provide evidence for a diverse terrestrial fauna. During the early Miocene uplift and mountain building filled in the Suwannee Strait. At this point coral reefs were forming in the Florida Keys. The Thomas Farm Quarry is the richest source of Miocene mammal fossils in the eastern US. During the ensuing Pliocene, Florida was home to amphibians, bears, a variety of birds, camelids, crocodilians, deer, dogs, dugongs, at least six genera of horses, peccaries, porpoises, relatives of modern elephants, rays, saber toothed cats, seals, sharks, tapirs, turtles, and whales. The remains of all these creatures have been found in a region of Polk County called Bone Valley. Late Tertiary vertebrate fossils are known from southern Florida. during these animals' lifetimes the southern 300 kilometers of Florida was still under water. Late Tertiary sediments of Gilchrist County preserve badgers, brown bears, camels, dogs, horses, rhinos and more. Mammoths, mastodons, sloths, giant beavers, and ungulates were preserved near Gainesville. The relatives of pronghorns also lived in the area.

The Pleistocene limestones of the Florida Keys are rich in fossils. The Pleistocene is the epoch of time best represented in Florida's fossil record. In fact, Florida's Pleistocene sediments are regarded as the best source of Pleistocene fossils in the world, especially for the mammals of that age. Also, Pleistocene Florida had a greater diversity of terrestrial vertebrates than any other place and time in North American history. At the time, the local sea level began to rise and fall along with the amount of water tied up in the glaciers covering the northern part of the continent. When the sea would withdraw savannas formed. Herds of American mastodon and Columbian mammoth browsed and grazed on the local foliage. The gigantic ground sloth Eremotherium was another contemporary large herbivore. Others included the antelope, bison, deer, armored glyptodonts, and the modern horse. These were preyed upon by predators like short-faced bears, jaguars, saber-toothed cats, lions, and dire wolves.

== History ==
In the 19th century, the first record paleontological and geological expeditions to Florida took place. In 1899 the Florida Legislature established the Florida Geological Survey with the first state geologist being Elias Howard Sellards. In 1913, Sellards put an advertisement in newspapers all over Florida inviting citizens to bring in interesting bones or fossils.

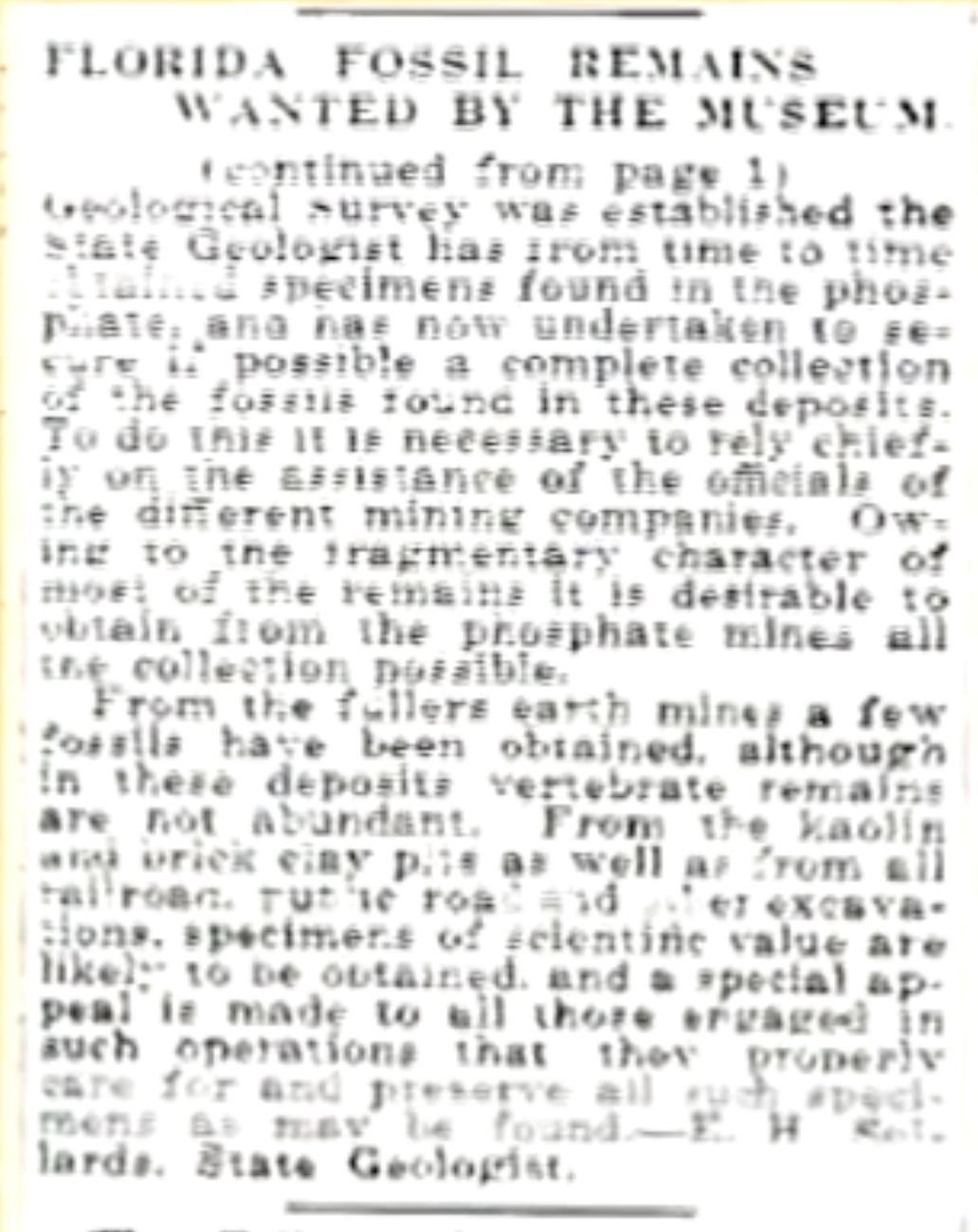
State Geologist Elias Howard Sellards invites citizens to report unique paleontological discoveries in Florida.

As a result, one of Sellards most famous projects became the Vero Man; the first time human remains were found in context alongside the extinct animals of the Pleistocene.

In 1931, a farmer uncovered some bones while plowing his field. He thought he had stumbled on a Native American graveyard. However, the bones turned out to be fossils and were bought by the University of Florida. The prehistoric creatures whose remains were preserved here include a large dog-like bear, two different kinds of camels, several different species of horse, and a pig-like animal. In 1963 several new Miocene fossil sites were discovered. One was found in the far northern region of the state, near its border with Georgia. Another was found near Ocala and a third discovery occurred in Hernando County. The Hernando County site preserved the remains of animals like alligators, members of the dog family, oreodonts, rhinoceroses, and tapirs.

== Major fossil sites ==
Many of Florida's most productive vertebrate fossil sites tend to focus on a single deposit. Sites with a high proportion of land vertebrates tend to be fissure-fill sites formed by old sinkholes within even older limestone of marine origin, which terrestrial animals became trapped and fossilized in.

- Cutler Fossil Site
- Gadsden County, Florida paleontological sites
- Haile Quarry site
- Inglis quarry
- Jefferson County, Florida paleontological sites
- Leon County, Florida paleontological sites
- Orange County, Florida paleontological sites
- Polk County, Florida paleontological sites
- Montbrook Fossil Site
- Leisey Shell Pit
- Suwannee County, Florida paleontological sites
- Thomas Farm Site

=== Protected areas ===
- Windley Key Fossil Reef Geological State Park

== Florida Fossil Permit Program ==
Since the 1980s, under Florida Statutes chapter 1004, citizens have been able to acquire a $5 permit from the University of Florida's paleontological department to collect fossils. Through this permit, regular citizens may collect fossils from sovereign submerged lands and, at the end of one year, report all collected fossils to the department. If after 60 days the Florida Museum of Natural History who administers the program does not request any fossils to be donated, ownership of the specimens will transfer to the finder.

Through collaborative efforts, Florida has enjoyed a major scientific boon from work between professionals and amateurs. Although the Florida Museum of Natural History (FLMNH) has the authority to request fossils be donated, the museum has never taken a fossil from a finder by force. Instead, the museum has operated from a position of mutual respect for amateur paleontologists which has resulted in strong amateur-professional relationships and led to many new discoveries to science through the program.

In 2025, international news broke of a discovery by a pair of divers who under the fossil permit program had found a rare, 500,000 year old Irvingtonian site in northwest Florida. This discovery would not have been made without the Florida Fossil Permit Program as the location was very remote.

Many have drawn comparisons between the Fossil Permit Program and the Isolated Finds Program which formerly existed in Florida and allowed for citizens to collaboratively collect and report isolated artifacts. The Isolated Finds Program, or IFP, existed from 1996-2005 and was seen by most to be a success. However the Isolated Finds Program was discontinued. This had an immediate effect of developing a rift between professional archaeologists and amateur fossil/artifact collectors. Unlike the Florida Fossil Program which has seen several important citizen-led discoveries over the last 20 years, the cancellation of the Isolated Finds Program has led to nearly no significant archaeological discoveries being reported in the same time frame.

== Notable Paleontologists ==
- Elias Howard Sellards 1875-1961: Florida's 1st State Geologist and Father of Florida Paleontology.
- Dr. S. David Webb: Former curator for the University of Florida's paleontological department from 1964-2003.
- Dr. Richard C. Hulbert: Author and former collections manager for the University of Florida paleontological department.
- Dr. Robert W. Sinibaldi: Amateur paleontologist, author, and past president of the Tampa Bay Fossil Club.
- Frank Garcia: Author and discoverer of the famed Leisey Shell Pit in 1984.
- Walter Auffenberg
- Pierce Brodkorb
- Cesare Emiliani

== Natural History Museums ==
- Florida Museum of Natural History, Gainesville
- Bishop Museum, Bradenton
- Mulberry Phosphate Museum, Mulberry
- Orlando Science Center, Orlando
- Palm Beach Museum of Natural History, Wellington
- Paleo Preserve Fossil Museum, Ruskin
