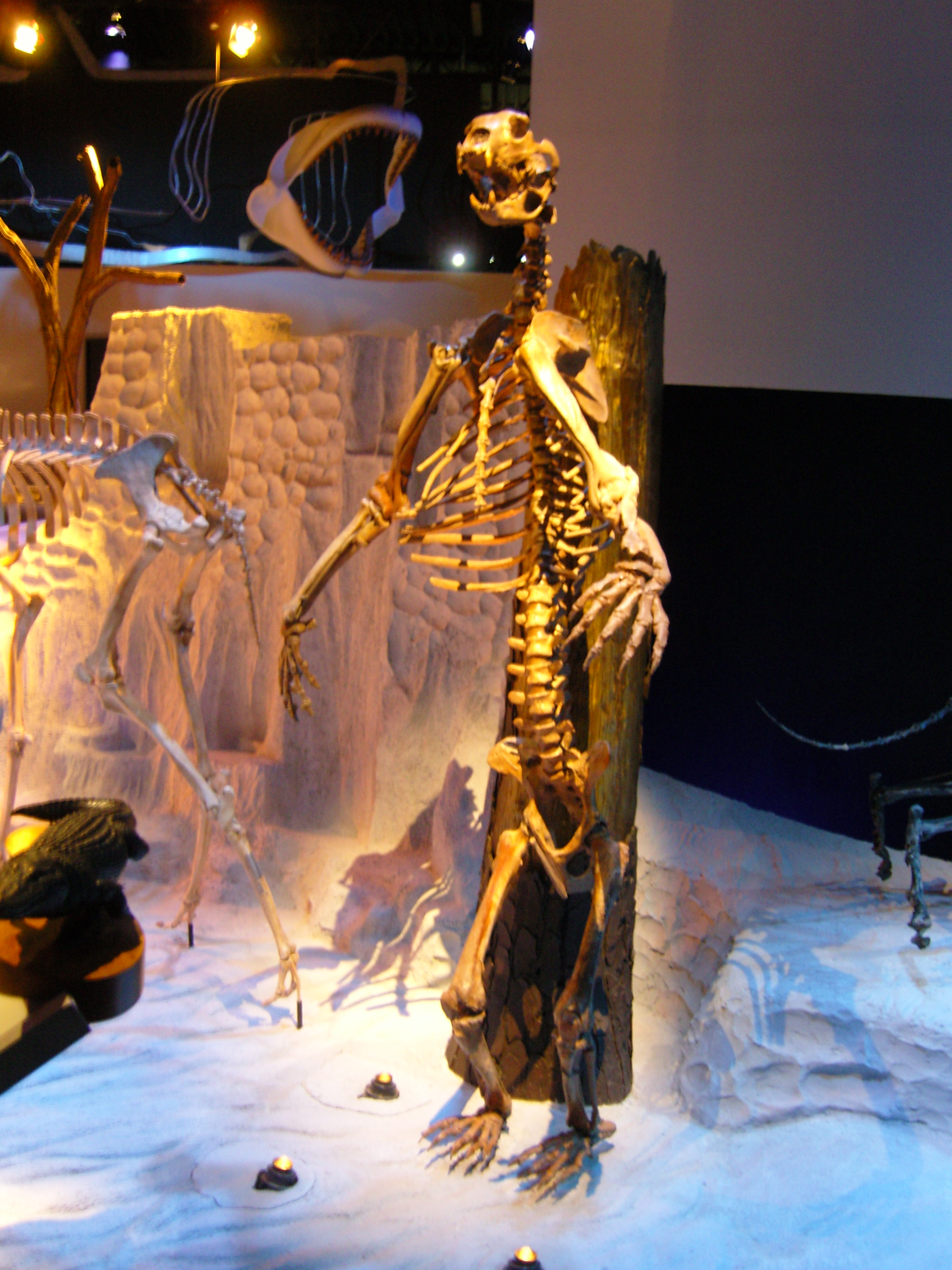
- T. floridanus skeleton

Scientific classification
- Kingdom: Animalia
- Phylum: Chordata
- Class: Mammalia
- Order: Carnivora
- Family: Ursidae
- Genus: Tremarctos
- Species: †T. floridanus

Binomial name
- †Tremarctos floridanus Gidley 1902

Synonyms
- Arctodus floridanus Gidley 1902 Tremarctos mexicanus Stock 1902

= Tremarctos floridanus =

Tremarctos floridanus Temporal range: 2.7–0.012 Ma Late Pliocene - Late Pleistocene

Extinct species of bear

Tremarctos floridanus is an extinct species of short-faced bear from North America. Its fossils have been largely found throughout the Southeastern United States and Mexico from the Late Pleistocene, and from earlier epochs at some sites in western North America. T. floridanus became extinct at the end of the Pleistocene.

== Taxonomy ==
Tremarctos floridanus is called the Florida spectacled bear, Florida cave bear, or rarely Florida short-faced bear. Originally, James W. Gidley named this animal Arctodus floridanus in 1928, until affinities with the spectacled bear were realised by Chester Stock when specimens from San Josecito Cave were recovered in 1950. Described as Tremarctos mexicanus, it was recombined as T. floridanus by Björn Kurtén (1963), Lundelius (1972), and Kurtén and Anderson (1980). Despite at least 35 individuals being recovered by 1967, almost all specimens consist of isolated teeth & skull fragments, save for the type specimen (from the Golf Course site of the Melbourne Bone Bed in Melbourne, Florida). Despite one such common name, T. floridanus is not considered a close relative of the Eurasian cave bear (Ursus spelaeus), which belonged to a different genus and subfamily.

=== Diagnostics ===
==== Tremarctos ====
T. floridanus is morphologically very similar to its sister species T. ornatus (the spectacled bear). However, not only was T. floridanus around twice as large as T. ornatus, the proportions of the humerus, femur and neck in particular are longer than T. ornatus, with T. floridanus being described as a relatively long-limbed species. Additionally, while the forelimbs are longer than the hindlimbs in T. ornatus (likely due to arboreal activity), they are of equal length in T. floridanus. Additionally, T. floridanus has also been described as possessing much more robust limb bones. However, the paws of T. floridanus are proportionally shorter and smaller than T. ornatus.

Notable differences also occur in the crania of T. floridanus and T. ornatus, with the rostrum of T. floridanus being relatively narrow compared with T. ornatus. Additionally, unlike T. ornatus, T. floridanus possesses a signature "glabella" (dome-like protrusion) on the frontal bone of the cranium. Both species share practically identical dentitions (particularly behind the canines), though the dentition of T. floridanus was larger, often with a reduced number of premolars and relatively longer molars. Tremarctos floridanus has mandibular condyles raised well above the plane of the teeth, while T. ornatus does not. The lower jaws of T. floridanus are larger; while the ramus of the mandible is taller in T. floridanus, the relative height of the mandible's coronoid process is the same in both species. Kurtén compared the differences between the Tremarctos species as the differences between brown bears and Eurasian cave bears.

==== Other bears ====
===== Arctodus =====
Fossils of T. floridanus can be confused with the similarly sized, partially contemporaneous short-faced bear, Arctodus pristinus. Tremarctos has lower crowned and considerably smaller teeth than its relative Arctodus. T. floridanus can be distinguished by narrower and shorter molars on average, but as they are often worn, differentiation can be difficult. In particular, the broader and more robust M2 molar of Arctodus has been used to distinguish between Arctodus and Tremarctos.

===== Ursus =====
The American black bear and T. floridanus are regularly co-specific; the M2 molar is often used to differentiate between the species. Despite their similar sizes, the M2 of T. floridanus has a subrectangular form with truncated ends, a flat crown profile, a straight line on the lingual side, a high anterior region, and lacks a cingulum ridge.

In addition to general cranial and dental differences between tremarctine and ursine bears, T. floridanus can also be distinguished from American black bears via their postcranial skeletons. The forelimbs of T. floridanus evidenced an entepicondylar foramen on the humerus, with the proximal end of the radius in T. floridanus being oval-shaped (while this is triangle-shaped in the American black bear). The cervical vertebrae are divergent in the orientation, form and proportions, while the number of ribs (13 sets in T. floridanus, 14 in the American black bear) is also different. The ischial bar and bone ridge of the acetabulum in the pelvis of T. floridanus are more narrow, while the greater trochanter is taller in the femur of T. floridanus.

== Evolution ==
Tremarctinae within Ursidae

- †Hemicyoninae
- - †Ursavinae
  - - Ailuropodinae
    - - Ursinae
      - - Tremarctinae (short-faced bears)
          - †Plionarctos
          - - †Arctodus
            - - Tremarctos
              - †Arctotherium

The closest living relative of the T. floridanus is the spectacled bear (T. ornatus) of South America; they are classified together with other short-faced bears (Arctodus, Arctotherium, Plionarctos) in the subfamily Tremarctinae. Tremarctine bears first appear as Plionarctos during the late Miocene epoch of North America. An investigation into the mitochondrial DNA of bear species indicates that short-faced bears diverged from the Ursinae subfamily approximately 5.7 million years ago. Around the Miocene-Pliocene boundary (~5.3Ma), tremarctine bears, along with other ursids, experienced an explosive radiation in diversity, as C_{4} vegetation (grasses) and open habitats dominated. The world experienced a major temperature drop and increased seasonality, and a faunal turnover which extinguished 70–80% of North American genera.

Correspondingly, the genetic divergence date for Arctodus is between 5.5 million and 4.8 million years ago, and between Arctotherium and Tremarctos at 4.1 million years ago. Researchers believe that Arctotherium was a sister lineage to Tremarctos, or even emerged from the Tremarctos genus. All three genera evolved from Plionarctos in the Blancan faunal stage of North America, and are first recorded as the medium-sized Arctodus pristinus, Tremarctos floridanus and Arctotherium sp. from the Late Blancan (Late Pliocene / Early Pleistocene) of North America circa 2.6 million years ago. These first appearances near the Plio-Pleistocene boundary coincide with the start of the Quaternary Glaciation, the formation of the Panama Land Bridge, and the second phase of the Great American Biotic Interchange, with the first records of the main South American faunal wave into the United States. A Plionarctos harroldum specimen from Taunton (Washington, 2.9Ma) appears evolutionarily intermediate between Plionarctos harroldum and Tremarctos floridanus, affirming that Plionarctos harroldum is the likely ancestor of Tremarctos.

The Intermontane Plateaus preserve the oldest possible remains of T. floridanus, being from Palm Spring Formation (Anza-Borrego, California, ~2.7Ma), Grand View fauna (Glenns Ferry Formation, Idaho, 2.3Ma), and San Simon (Arizona ca. 2.2Ma), although the Grand View specimen may instead represent Plionarctos. Additionally, though originally described as Arctodus sp., researchers suggest that indeterminate ursid from the mid-Blancan Buckhorn fauna (New Mexico, 4Ma - 3Ma) may represent either Tremarctos sp. or Protarctos abtrusus.

Unlike its Neotropical sister species (T. ornatus), T. floridanus was a temperate species that has almost entirely been recovered from Nearctic sites. The fossil record of T. ornatus is unknown, as T. ornatus remains do not appear in the South American record until the Holocene, which may indicate that T. ornatus emerged from T. floridanus in the Holocene. However, as the montane niche (1,800m or higher) was otherwise open, T. ornatus may have instead evolved in the Pleistocene.

Genetic research on the mitochondrial DNA of tremarctine bears indicates Tremarctos was more closely related to Arctotherium than Arctodus. However, a preliminary investigation of tremarctine bear's nuclear DNA suggests an extensive history of hybridization between Tremarctos and Arctodus in North America, although hybridization with Arctotherium (likely A. wingei) as the Tremarctos genus migrated southwards into South America is also possible. Evidence of gene flow between Tremarctos and an ursine bear was also uncovered, most likely due to the extensive overlap between Tremarctos and the ancestors of the American black bear in Pleistocene North America.

== Description ==
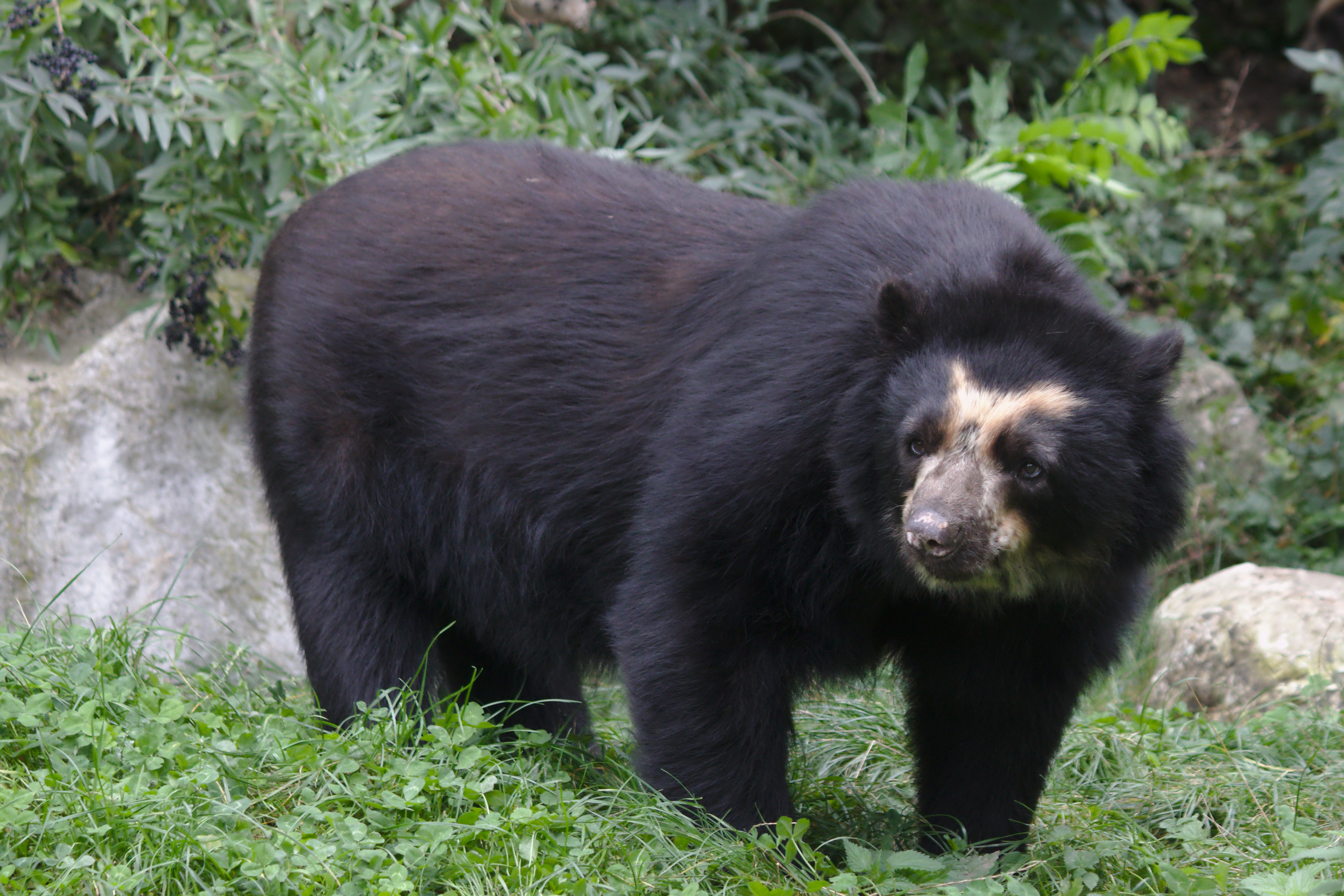
Tremarctos floridanus had a similar anatomy to Tremarctos ornatus, its surviving sister species.

=== Skull ===
The canalis semicircularis lateral suggests that T. floridanus had a head posture of 38°, which is more oblique than its sister species T. ornatus (29°); as T. ornatus inhabits densely vegetated areas, the more oblique head posture in T. floridanus could infer a greater capacity for long distance vision. Tremarctos floridanus has mandibular condyles raised well above the plane of the teeth, while T. ornatus does not, suggesting T. ornatus potentially possesses a larger gape. As in other tremarctine bears, tooth size (particularly the P4) could be variable, as exemplified by an average sized female from Tennessee possessing the largest known teeth in T. floridanus, with some even comparable to Arctodus.

=== Postcranial ===
T. floridanus is thought to have been almost twice the size of T. ornatus, averaging around the size of a large black bear, with one specimen calculated to 219 kg. Like other tremarctine bears, T. floridanus was highly sexually dimorphic, with males being 25% larger than females. Though noticeably larger than its South American relative, T. floridanus was still much smaller than its contemporary Tremarctine relative Arctodus. Like T. ornatus and A. simus, T. floridanus possessed a false thumb.

== Range ==
=== Blancan and Irvingtonian ===
The distribution of Tremarctos floridanus changed across its natural history. In the Blancan (4.75Ma to 1.806Ma) and Irvingtonian (1.806Ma to 250,000 BP) faunal stages, T. floridanus remains are sparse, and solely recovered from western North America. The Late Blancan records Tremarctos sp. from San Simon, Arizona, and T. floridanus possibly from the Grand View fauna of Idaho (though this may be Plionarctos), while Irvingtonian remains have been recovered from El Golfo in Sonora, with the Anza-Borrego Desert in California recording both Late Blancan and Irvingtonian remains. T. floridanus was recorded from the Blancan Hagerman Fossil Beds, but these have been reassigned to Protarctos abstrusus. Irvingtonian remains were reported from Cumberland Bone Cave in Maryland, but subsequent research establishes Arctodus pristinus was the only tremarctine bear present at the locality.

=== Rancholabrean ===
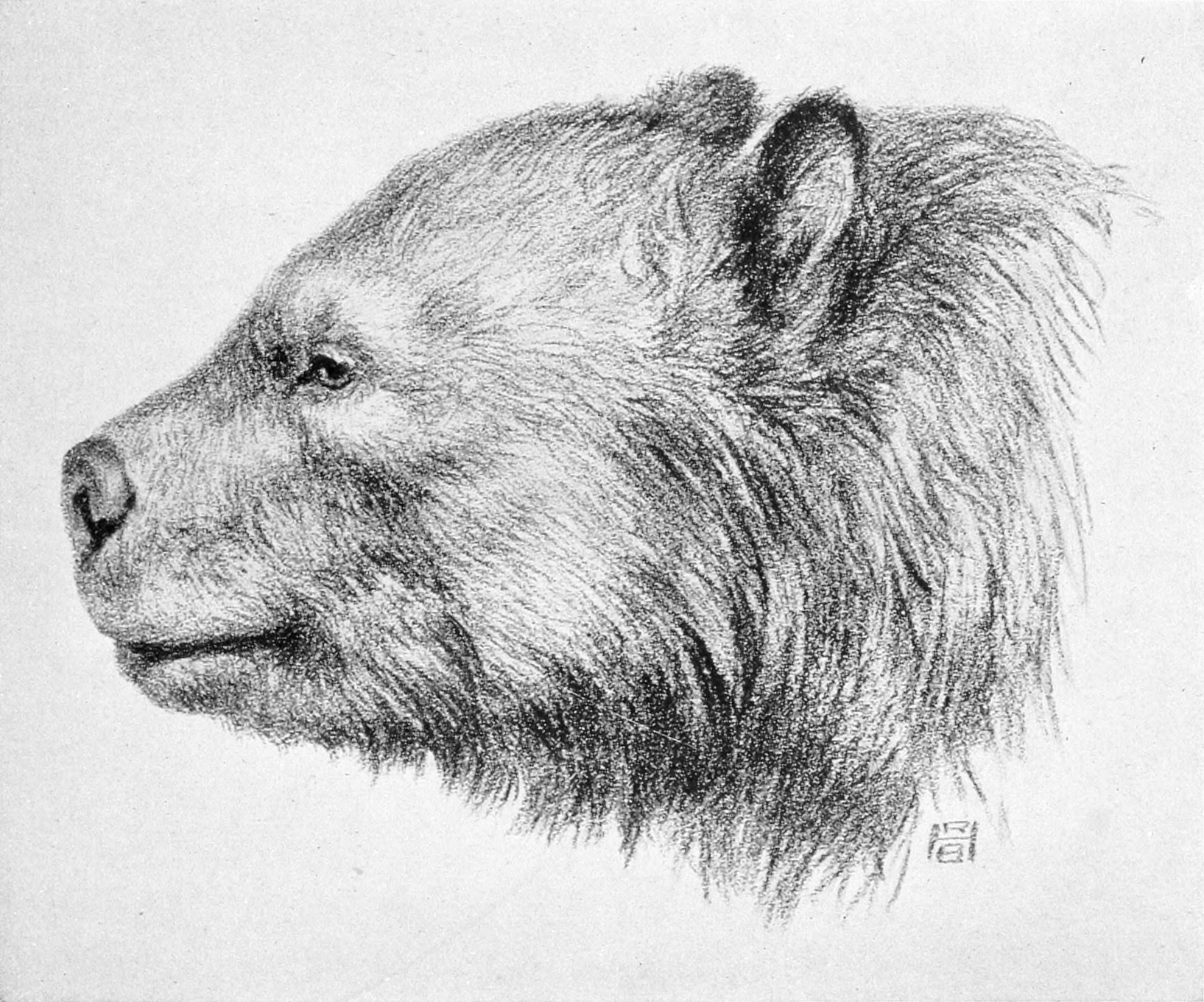
Arctotherium may have limited the distribution of T. floridanus in southern Mexico and Central America.

However, in the following Rancholabrean epoch (250,000 BP to 11,700 BP), T. floridanus was widely distributed along the eastern Atlantic Plain and the broader Gulf Coast. Fossils have been recovered from the US states of Florida, Georgia, Mississippi, South Carolina, Tennessee, and Texas, and the Mexican states of Michoacán, and Nuevo León.

T. floridanus is suggested to have expanded its range into higher altitudes during warmer interstadials and interglacials, which would explain its presence in Inner Space Cavern on Edwards Plateau, Texas. The Grassy Cove Saltpeter Cave specimen, from Cumberland Plateau, Tennessee, has been radiocarbon dated to within the climatically unstable MIS 3.

T. floridanus has been described from Belize, however the recent reassignment of a T. floridanus specimen to the morphologically similar Arctotherium wingei from the Hoyo Negro, and other positive identifications of A. wingei from Belize have put under question current T. floridanus identifications in Yucatán Peninsula. Current scholarly analysis asserts that A. wingei may have restricted the range of T. floridanus outside of Central & South America until the extinction of A. wingei, where subsequently Tremarctos begins to be found in the South America.

Additionally, T. floridanus specimens assigned by Kurtén in New Mexico (such as Isleta Caves and Conkling Cavern) have been reassigned to Arctodus simus - no western specimens of T. floridanus have been found in the Rancholabrean.

=== Map of fossil localities ===
Interactive distribution map of Tremarctos floridanus (hover over dots for locality information)

Legend: Late Blancan (Pliocene / Early Pleistocene)

Irvingtonian (Early / Middle Pleistocene)

Rancholabrean (Late Pleistocene)

== Palaeobiology ==
=== Diet ===
Based on geometric morphometric analysis of its cranium and mandible, T. floridanus may have been almost entirely herbivorous. However, the similarities in skull morphology between it and living spectacled bears may instead reflect phylogeny rather than similar dietary habits.

== Paleoecology ==
=== Atlantic Plain ===
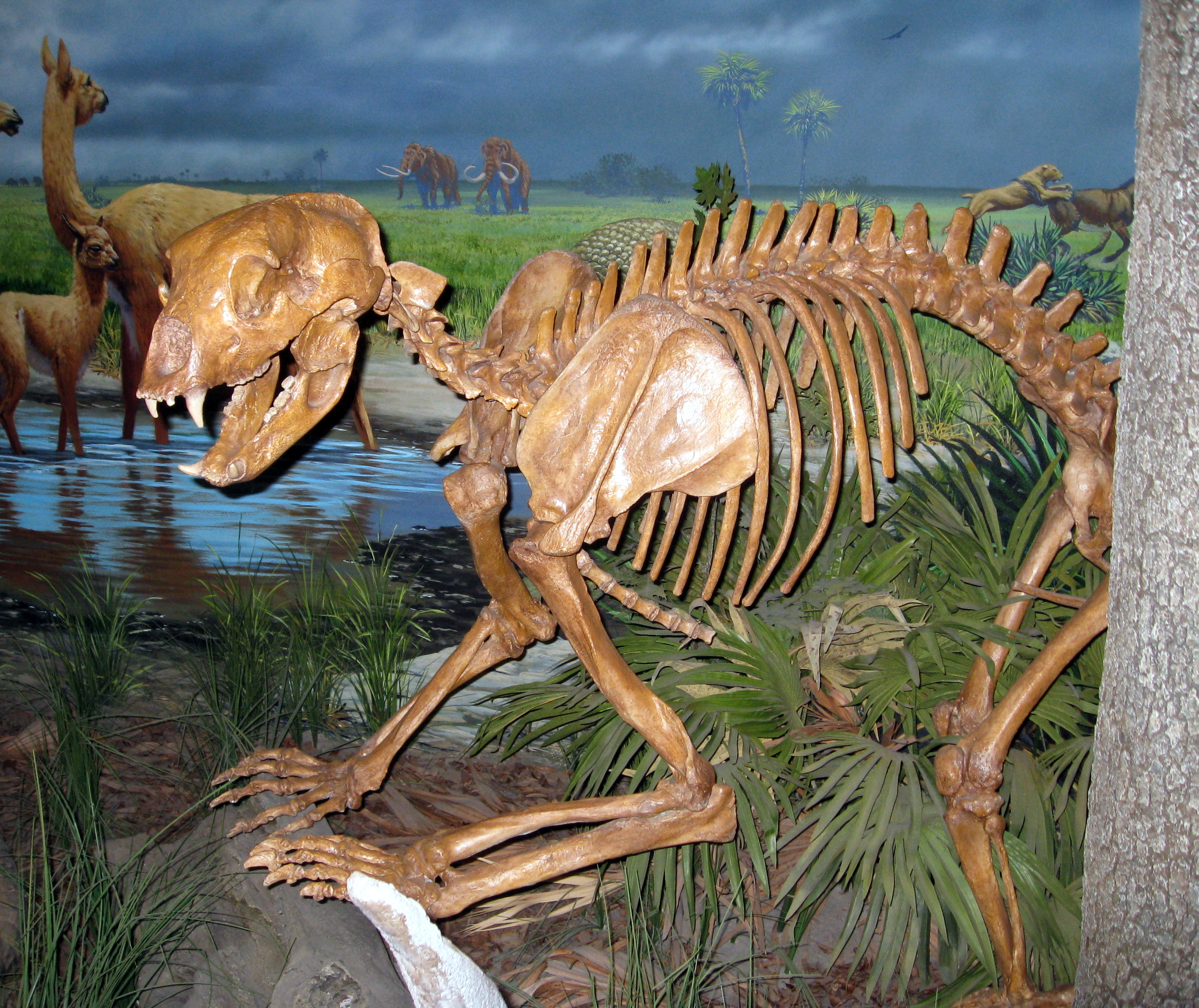
Arctodus pristinus may have been a competitor of its fellow Tremarctine relative Tremarctos floridanus in the Atlantic Plain.

The Atlantic Plain (in particular Florida) hosts the greatest number of T. floridanus specimens on the continent, coming from well known sites such as Aucilla River, Cutler Fossil Site, Devil's Den Cave, Haile Quarry site, Melbourne Bone Bed, Rock Springs and Vero Beach. Despite this, Tremarctos floridanus is unknown before the Rancholabrean faunal stage, with Arctodus pristinus, a tremarctine bear inhabiting eastern North America during the Blancan and Irvingtonian, being very similar to T. floridanus in terms of size, skeletal anatomy, and dietary preferences. Generally speaking, large tremarctine fossils from the Early and Middle Pleistocene of Florida are considered to be A. pristinus, whereas those from the Late Pleistocene of Florida are considered to be T. floridanus. Indeed, black bears and Tremarctos floridanus are believed to have only colonized Florida with the extinction of A. pristinus (both of which only appear in Florida in the Late Pleistocene), however, T. floridanus could yet still be found from older sites in Florida. T. floridanus was possibly an ecological replacement of A. pristinus, with T. floridanus finds becoming widespread in Rancholabrean Florida and the wider southeastern United States.

At the Rainbow River and Lake Rousseau localities in Rancholabrean Florida, Tremarctos floridanus have been recovered alongside Smilodon, dire wolves, jaguars, ground sloths (Megalonyx, Paramylodon), llamas (Hemiauchenia, Palaeolama), Vero's tapir, giant beaver, capybara, Holmesina, horses, Bison antiquus, mastodon, Columbian mammoths and Arctodus simus, in a climate similar to today's. Furthermore, the abundance of black bears, and particularly Tremarctos floridanus in Florida, has led to a theorized niche partitioning of ursids in Florida, with Tremarctos floridanus being herbivorous, and black bears and Arctodus simus being omnivorous, with Arctodus being possibly more inclined towards carnivory.

During the Rancholabrean, Florida and the Gulf Coast hosted a subtropical faunal region. Sometimes referred to as the Holmesina ("Chlamytherium") -glyptodont faunal province, T. floridanus was joined by other key indicator species such as Holmesina, Glyptotherium, capybaras, Eremotherium, Cuvieronius, Hesperotestudo, Mylohyus, Palaeolama, and Dasypus bellus. The now submerged continental shelf in the Gulf of Mexico appears to have provided a dispersal corridor consisting of savanna and thorn scrub habitats between south Texas and Florida for these largely Neotropical fauna. Generally in the southeast, interior regions were dominated by boreal forest, which transitioned into a unique spruce–pine–oak forest between the Last Glacial Maximum and Younger Dryas as the climate became warmer. However, in Florida this trend was reversed, with warm-wet adapted Pinus forest occupying central Florida during colder periods, and cooler & drier oak–scrub prairie becoming dominant during interstadials.

=== Appalachian Highlands ===
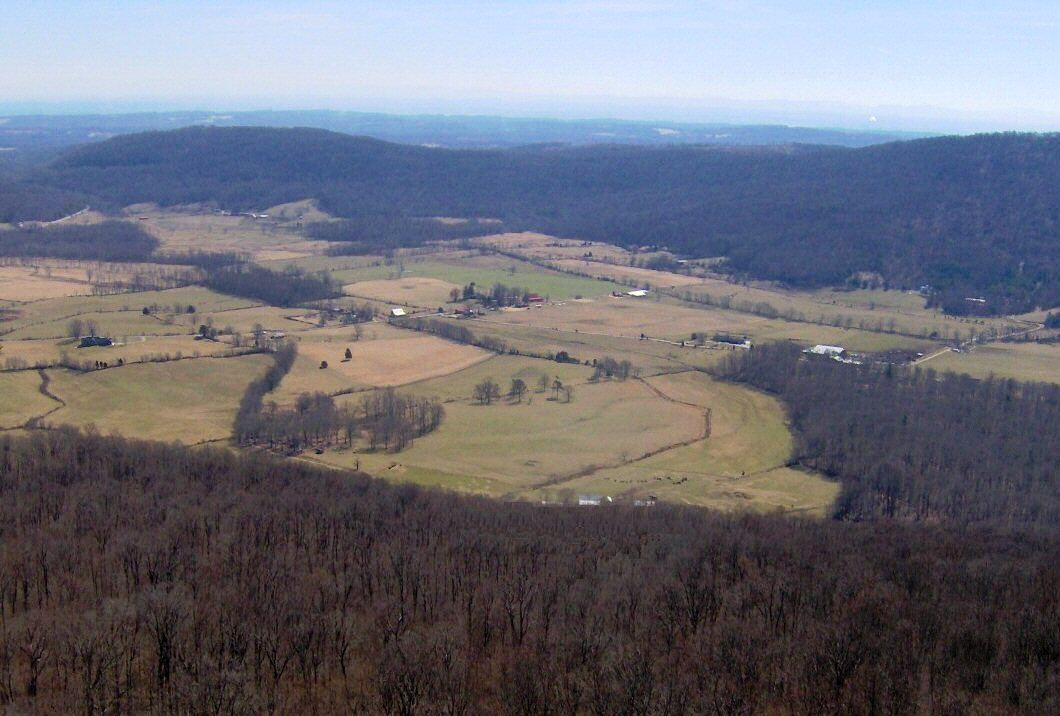
The Grassy Cove specimen from Tennessee is the northernmost confirmed individual of T. floridanus yet recovered.

The Grassy Cove Saltpeter Cave specimen was radiocarbon dated to 33,660 ± 3980 radiocarbon BP. The specimen is believed to have been a female on the basis of its smaller paws, but was the size of a large black bear. This individual possibly preserves a fractured arm, caused by the 9 m (30 ft) drop into the lower cave level it was recovered from. Should T. floridanus have been present at the same locality after the Last Glacial Maximum, the Rancholabrean mid-Appalachians would have constituted open forest (dominated by jack pine), dense forest-edges and grasslands, with boreal, temperate and mid-western prairie elements. Other fauna would have included oxen (Ovibos, Bootherium), bison, horse, tapir, peccaries (Mylohyus, Platygonus), Cervalces, caribou, elk, white-tailed deer, ground sloths (Glossotherium, Megalonyx), mammoth, mastodon, giant beaver, brown bear, black bear, jaguar, the dire wolf, Smilodon, Miracinonyx, and Arctodus simus. An isotope study on a T. floridanus individual from Ladd's Quarry, Georgia broadly reconstructed the specimen as an omnivore.

=== Interior Plains ===
Laubach III in the Inner Space Cavern (dated to ca. 23,230 ± 490 radiocarbon BP) of the Interior Plains contains many animals that have modern relatives associated with subtropical climates, including Tremarctos floridanus, common opossum, Mexican free-tailed bat, jaguar, armadillo, and Glyptotherium. The fauna appears to have been deposited under a generally warm climate (inter-stadial).

=== Intermontane Plateaus ===
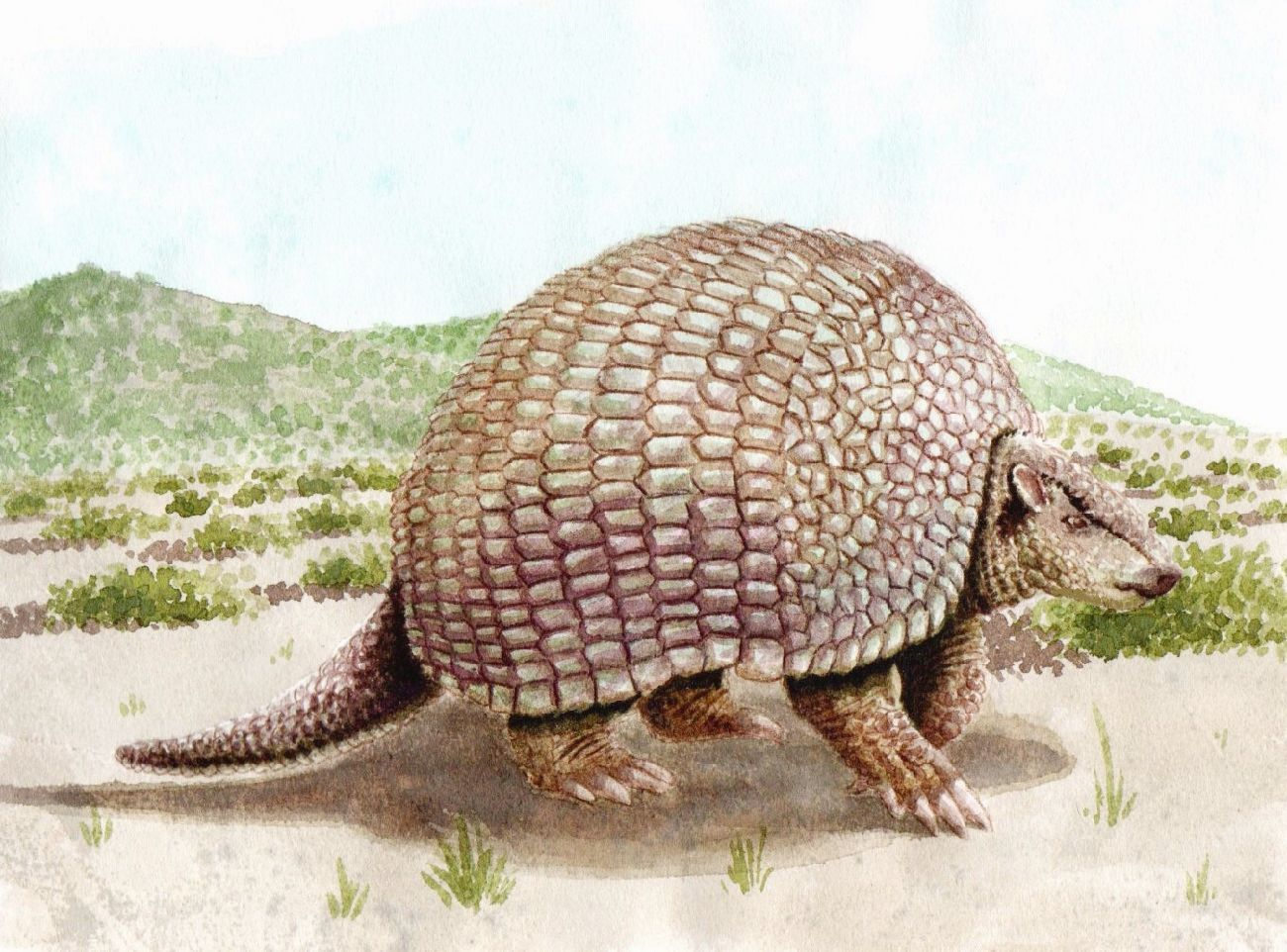
T. floridanus formed a close ecological association with giant armadillos such as Pampatherium and other Xenarthrans during the Rancholabrean faunal stage.

The Intermontane Plateaus is the only region to preserve T. floridanus remains from the Blancan and Irvingtonian faunal stages, in addition to the Rancholabrean. T. floridanus may have evolved from Plionarctos harroldum, as a potential transitional fossil may have been recorded from Taunton (Washington, 2.9Ma). Dubious remains have been recovered from New Mexico (Buckhorn Fauna, 4Ma - 3Ma) and Idaho (Grand View fauna, 2.3Ma), while validated remains are recorded from California (Palm Spring Formation, ~2.7Ma - 1.8Ma) and San Simon (Tremarctos sp., 2.2Ma).

In the Anza-Borrego Desert, T. floridanus has been recovered from the Arroyo Seco local fauna (Late Pliocene, 3.041Ma - 2.581Ma), Vallecito Creek local fauna (Early Pleistocene, 1.95Ma - 1.77Ma) and the Borrego Badlands. Appearing in the Late Blancan (~2.7Ma), the persistence of T. floridanus into the Irvingtonian-age Vallecito Creek local fauna was part of a gradual faunal transition, which blended traditionally Blancan fauna (Stegomastodon, Titanotylopus, Bensonomys, Equus simplicidens) with typically Irvingtonian fauna (such as T. floridanus, Tetrametryx, other Equus sp., Lepus and Camelops) in the Late Blancan and Early Irvingtonian. T. floridanus appears just after the isolation of the basin from the Colorado River Delta ca. 2.8Ma, transforming the woodlands and delta plains into the Tapiado lakes, followed by braidplains and floodplains.

In the Rancholabrean highlands of the Mexican Plateau, San Josecito Cave in Nuevo León hosted an extension of the Southern Plains, which in Nuevo León were flanked to the west by the Sierra Madre Oriental. T. floridanus inhabited this Rocky Mountain biome (~28,000 radiocarbon years BP), which consisted of an open pine-oak forest / savanna (in contrast with the closed pine-oak forests of today), with a xeric Juniperus scrub also being present. Reptile remains at San Josecito Cave indicate a biotic relationship between the Sierra Madre Oriental and the Trans-Mexican Volcanic Belt across the Mexican Plateau, two regions which are currently ecologically separated. At La Cinta-Portalitos (Michoacán/Guanajuato) in the Trans-Mexican Volcanic Belt, prime habitat for Tremarctos floridanus were the gallery forests (Alnus, Fraxinus, Salix) and their wetlands (Phragmites, Typha), along with white-tailed deer, capybaras, Pampatherium, horses, and Cuvieronius, while at the same locality its relative Arctodus simus preferred the closed temperate forests of the Madrean pine–oak woodlands.

=== Interactions with humans ===
Several Rancholabrean localities in Florida have recovered both T. floridanus and humans from identical strata (Devil's Den Cave, Melbourne Bone Bed, Vero Beach), indicating a co-existence during the terminal Pleistocene. While the remains at Devil's Den Cave were once dated to 8,000 BP, subsequent research indicates the fossils present were from the Rancholabrean epoch instead.

== Extinction ==
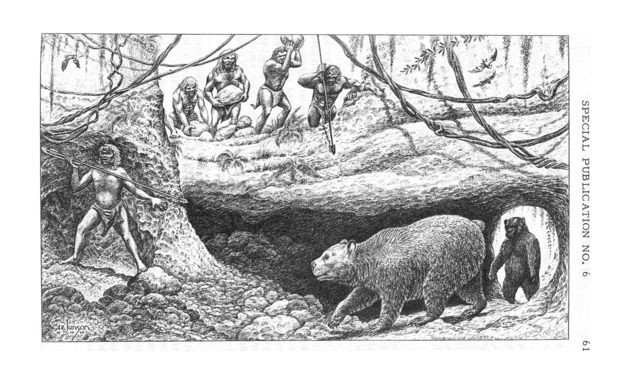
A reconstruction of an interaction between humans and T. floridanus at Vero Beach by the Florida Geological Survey (1959).

The chronology of megafaunal extinctions (such as Tremarctos floridanus) in the Late Pleistocene extinctions has been disputed. The last reliable direct radiocarbon date for T. floridanus is 12,686–12,752 calibrated years Before Present from the Calera cave system (San Luis Potosí, Mexico); the dire wolf from the same cave system is radiocarbon dated to 13,574–13,666 calibrated years Before Present. Associated fauna that were also endemic to the broader Gulf of Mexico region, such as Eremotherium, Glyptotherium, and Holmesina, have reliable final dates predating the end of the Last Glacial Maximum of North America.

In the United States, T. floridanus remains from the end of the Pleistocene are concentrated in the Atlantic Plains, having been recovered from 15 localities; this is in contrast with the Interior Plains (one locality) and Appalachian Highlands (two localities). Statistical analyses suggest that a later survival (until the end of the Rancholabrean epoch ca. 11,700 BP) of the United States is possible, based on sampling biases associated with uncommon fauna, and a lack of reliable dates from the humid Atlantic plain due to poor preservation.

While T. floridanus may have disappeared in North America, the species may have evolved into T. ornatus in South America, either in the Pleistocene or the Holocene. Genetic research on T. ornatus suggests a possible history of hybridization with Arctotherium as the Tremarctos genus migrated southwards into South America. Molecular evidence from Colombian, Ecuadorian and Venezuelan T. ornatus specimens suggests an internal population divergence occurred between 15,000 and 25,000 thousand years ago, with the earliest known remains of T. ornatus dating to 6,790 BP (5,980 radiocarbon years), from Chaquil Cave, Peru.
