= Alforjas =

Alforjas Temporal range: Late Miocene

Scientific classification
- Kingdom: Animalia
- Phylum: Chordata
- Class: Mammalia
- Order: Artiodactyla
- Family: Camelidae
- Tribe: Lamini
- Genus: †Alforjas; Harrison, 1979

Species
- †A. taylori Harrison, 1979

Extinct genus of mammals

Alforjas is an extinct genus of camelid, endemic to North America. They lived during the Late Miocene 10.3—5.3 mya existing for approximately 5 million years.

Alforjas is Spanish for the saddle bags used on domestic llamas. The name has a regional association with the meaning of humps or lumps. Alforjas differs from Pleiolama, Hemiauchenia, Palaeolama, and Lama in its greater height of crown, larger size, and longer snout.

The range of the Alforjas include the Mexican states of Zacatecas and Guanajauto, and the U.S. states of Oregon, California, Nevada, Idaho, Arizona, New Mexico, Texas, Oklahoma, Colorado, Kansas, and Nebraska.
