= Cutler Fossil Site =

Archaeological and paleontological site in Florida, US

The Cutler Fossil Site (8DA2001) is a sinkhole near Biscayne Bay in Palmetto Bay, Florida, which is south of Miami. The site has yielded bones of Pleistocene animals and bones as well as artifacts of Paleo-Indians and people of the Archaic period.

== Discovery and excavation ==
The presence of fossils in a sinkhole on the Charles Deering Estate was discovered in 1979 by people searching for wood to use as knife handles. They took some unusually hard pieces they found to an archaeologist, who identified them as fossil horse teeth. The discovery was not publicized until an archaeological excavation could be mounted in 1985, but in the meantime, an unauthorized collector had dug pits in the sinkhole, removed fossils and artifacts, and disturbed contexts. Later, most of the fossils and artifacts removed by the collector were recovered.

The Deering Estate protested designation of the sinkhole as a "historically significant site", which would have protected the area from development. Eventually, the site was acquired by Miami-Dade County. It now is part of the Charles Deering Estate Park.

The Cutler Fossil Site is located in a sinkhole on the Miami Rock Ridge, a karstitic limestone formation running near the coast in Miami-Dade County. The ridge at the site is approximately 5 metres (16 ft) above the current sea level, and less than a kilometer from Biscayne Bay.

In the late Pleistocene the area was 100 metres (330 ft) or more above sea level, and many kilometers from the ocean. The sinkhole is approximately 8 metres (26 ft) by 10 metres (33 ft) in size. The pre-excavation soil surface in the sinkhole was about 7 feet (2.1 m) below the ground surrounding the sinkhole. Cores indicate that the fossil layer in the sinkhole is at least 4 metres (13 ft) deep, extending well below the water table.

The Cutler Fossil Site was excavated in 1985 and 1986, with funding from the owners of the Deering Estate. The excavation was led by Robert S. Carr of the Dade County Historic Preservation Division, with help from the Archaeological and Historical Conservancy and the Florida Museum of Natural History. A grid of 32 1-meter squares was established, and each square was excavated to just above the water table, approximately 6 feet (1.8 m) below the original surface. Recent disturbances to the soil were up to 2 feet (0.61 m) deep, and had to be removed before controlled excavation could proceed.

== Animal fossils ==
Thousands of fossil bones found in the sinkhole represent 47 mammal species (of which 16 are extinct, and another three locally extinct), 51 bird species (seven extinct), nine reptile species, seven amphibian species, and five fish species. The mix of species represented in the sinkhole suggests that during the late Pleistocene, it held standing water for at least part of the year, and was close to hardwood hammocks, pinelands, marshes, grasslands, and the sea coast. Pleistocene megafauna represented in the sinkhole include tapirs, horses, Columbian mammoth, American mastodon, camels (Paleolama and Hemiauchenia), Bison antiquus, dire wolf, spectacled bears (Tremarctos floridanus and Tremarctos ornatus), Florida (or American) lion (Panthera atrox), a saber-toothed cat (Smilodon fatalis), and jaguar. Birds represented in the sinkhole include an extinct caracara (Milvago reardi), and an extinct hawk-eagle (Spizaetus grinnelli), as well as the California condor. The sinkhole was probably used at times as a den by dire wolves and by jaguars. The bones of 42 individual dire wolves, mostly juveniles, have been recovered from the sinkhole.

== Human remains and artifacts ==
Human bones, teeth, and artifacts were found in association with the bones of Pleistocene animals at the sinkhole. As simple proximity of bones does not prove that humans were contemporaries of Pleistocene animals at the Cutler site, evidence of human modification of animal bones was sought. Approximately 800 bones and fragments that had been burned were identified. Natural fires in the sinkhole were unlikely, and Carr argues that the burned bones resulted from human action. Most of the burned bones came from animals that remain extant in Florida, but some were from a mammoth, from the extinct armadillo Dasypus bellus, a paleolama, and a horse. Some burned bones were also from either a coyote (a species that after dying out at the end of the Pleistocene, has returned to Florida only in the last century) or a domestic dog.

Artifacts recovered from the same layers include marine shells modified as tools, and a number of stone tools. Both local limestone and imported chert were used for tools. The chert has been identified as coming from quarries in central Florida. Projectile points from the sinkhole have been classified as Bolen Beveled, Dalton, and Greenbriar, dated to 10,000 to 12,000 years ago.

Human bones and teeth from at least five individuals were found in the Cutler sinkhole. Some of the individuals appear to have been buried in graves. Three of the individuals were adults, including an older male and a presumed female. Another individual was a child of three to four years of age. Some of the human bones had been burnt, raising the possibility of cremation or cannibalism. What are believed to be Paleo-Indian hearths were found at the same level as the Paleo-Indian artifacts. Radiocarbon dating of two samples of charcoal from those hearths yielded a mean calibrated age of 10,875 Before Present (9320 BCE).
