= Haile Quarry site =

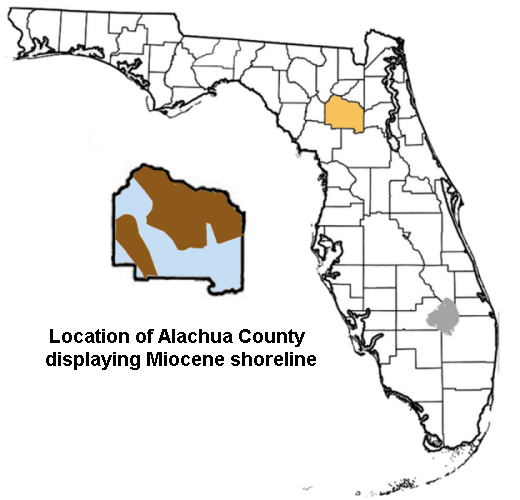
Alachua County, Florida and Miocene shoreline based on the Florida Geologic Survey.

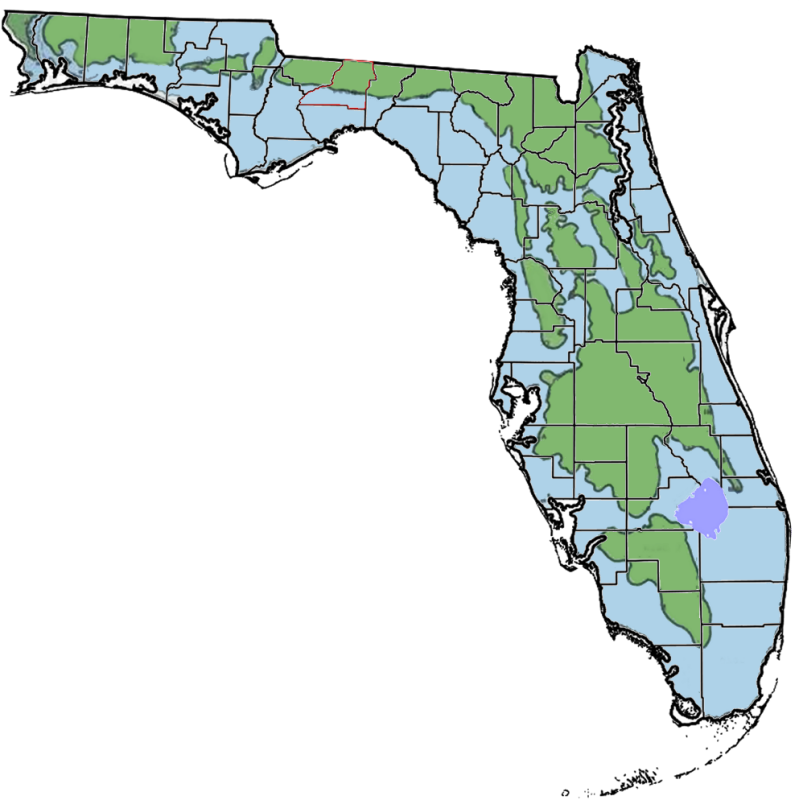
Florida during the Miocene

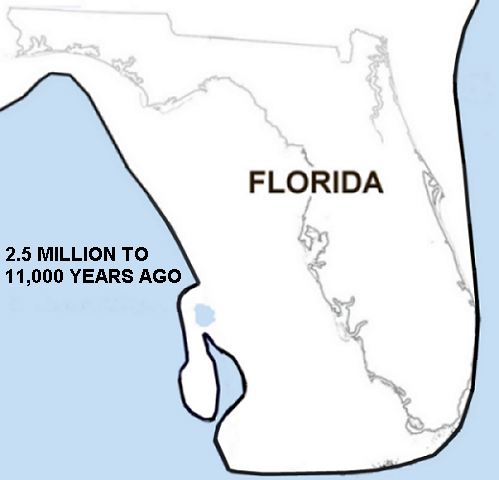
Florida during the Pleistocene

The Haile Quarry or Haile sites are an Early Miocene and Pleistocene assemblage of vertebrate fossils located in the Haile quarries, Alachua County, northern Florida. The assemblage was discovered during phosphate mining, which began in the late 1940s. Haile sites are found in the Alachua Formation. Two sites within the Ocala Limestone yielded Upper Eocene Valvatida (sea stars) and mollusks.

University of Florida and Florida Museum of Natural History paleontologists numbered the Haile fossil sites with Arabic and Roman numbers and letters in order to define locations more distinctly. UF scientists used Roman numbering and the FLMNH scientists used Arabic.

== Numbered Haile sites ==
- V/XIXA a.k.a. Haile 5A, 19A (FLMNH repository)
- 5B Miocene
- 6A.
- 7C.
- 12B.
- XVA a.k.a. 15A.
- 16A.
- 21A.
- ID.
- VIIA.
- VIIIA.
- XIB.
- XIIIA.
- XIIIB.
- XIVA.
- XIXD.
- IVB.

Late Pleistocene Haile sites: 7C, 15A (No longer exists), 16A, and 21A.

== Fish ==
- Carcharodon auriculatus

== Amphibians/Reptiles ==
- Bufo (toad)
- Coluber constrictor (Eastern Racer)
- Emydidae (turtle)
- †Gavialosuchus (Crocodile)
- Hesperotestudo crassiscutata (turtle)
- Deirochelys (Chicken Turtle)
- Micrurus fulvius (Coral snake)
- Ranidae (True Frog)
- †Sphenodontia (lizard)
- Terrapene carolina (Eastern Box Turtle)

== Birds ==
- Anatidae indet (duck)
- †Aizenogyps toomeyae (Condor)
- Anhinga grande (Snakebird)
- Ceryle torquata (Ringed Kingfisher)
- Motmotidae (Motmot)
- Phalacrocorax (Cormorant)

== Mammals ==
=== Carnivores ===
- Procyon (raccoon)

==== Canidae ====
- †Borophagus (ancestor of dogs)
- Canidae
  - †Aenocyon armbrusteri (Armbruster's wolf)
  - †Aenocyon dirus (Dire wolf)
  - †Canis edwardii (Edward's wolf)
  - Canis rufus (Red wolf)
- †Epicyon haydeni (ancestor of dogs)
- Urocyon cinereoargenteus (grey fox)

==== Bears ====
- †Arctodus pristinus (Short-faced Bear)
- †Tremarctos floridanus (Florida Cave Bear)

==== Feliformia ====
- †Homotherium (Saber-toothed cat)
- †Xenosmilus hodsonae (Saber-toothed cat)
- Lynx rufus (Bobcat)
- †Panthera onca (Jaguar)
- †Smilodon gracilis (Saber-toothed cat)

==== Mustelids ====
- Conepatus leuconotus (Hog-nosed skunk)
- Mephitis mephitis (Striped Skunk)
- Mustela frenata (Long-tailed Weasel)
- †Satherium piscinarium (North American Giant Otter)
- Spilogale putorius (Eastern Spotted Skunk)
- Trigonictis cookii (Galictis)

=== Herbivores ===
==== Even-toed ungulates ====
- †Aepycamelus (Camel)
- Bison latifrons (Bison)
- †Camelidae (Camel)
- †Gelocidae (early horse-type ungulate)
- †Hemiauchenia macrocephala (Llama)
- †Mylohyus floridanus (Peccary)
- †Odocoileus virginianus (Deer)
- †Palaeolama mirifica (Llama)
- †Platygonus, P. compressus, P. vetus (Peccary)
- †Yumaceras hamiltoni (early horse-type ungulate)

==== Odd-toed ungulates ====
- †Aphelops (rhinoceros)
- †Calippus, C. elachistus, C. hondurensis (horse)
- †Dolichohippus (horse)
- †Equus sp,. E. fraternus, E. leidyi (horse)
- †Tapirus, T. haysii (tapir)
- †Dasypus bellus (armadillo)
- †Hippotherium, H. ingenuum, H. plicatile (horse)
- †Nannippus, N. peninsulatus, N. westoni (horse)
- †Neohipparion trampasense (horse)
- †Protohippus gidleyi (horse)
- †Pseudhipparion skinneri (horse)
- †Teleoceras, T. proterum (rhinoceros)

=== Proboscidea ===
- †Cuvieronius tropicus (early elephant)
- †Gomphotheriidae (elephant)

=== Xenarthra ===
- Dasypus bellus (armadillo)
- †Eremotherium, E. eomigrans (giant sloth)
- †Glossotherium chapadmalense (giant ground sloth)
- †Glyptotherium arizonae (armadillo-like)
- †Holmesina floridanus, H. olmesina, H. septentrionalis (armadillo)
- †Pachyarmatherium leiseyi]] (armadillo-like)
- †Megalonyx, M. leptostomus, M. wheatlyi (giant ground sloth)
- †Paramylodon harlani (giant ground sloth)
- †Pliometanastes (giant ground sloth)

=== Bats ===
- Myotis austroriparius (Southeastern Bat)
- Desmodus, D. archaeodaptes, D. stocki (Common Vampire Bat)
- Lasiurus intermedius (Northern Yellow Bat)
- Pipistrellus subflavus (Eastern Pipistrelle)

=== Rodents ===
- Atopomys texensis
- Castor canadensis (beaver)
- Cryptopterus webbi (squirrel)
- Didelphis virginiana (Virginia Opossum)
- Erethizon, E. dorsatum, E. poyeri (porcupine)
- Geomys pinetis (pocket gopher)
- Microtus australis (vole)
- Microtus pinetorum (Woodland Vole)
- †Mylagaulus kinseyi (Horned Gopher)
- †Neochoerus, N. aesopi (Capybara)
- Neofiber alleni (Round-Tailed Muskrat)
- Neotoma (Packrat)
- Neotoma floridana (Florida Woodrat)
- Ochrotomys nuttalli (Golden Mouse)
- Orthogeomys propinetis (gopher)
- Oryzomys palustris (Marsh Rice Rat)
- Peromyscus (Deer Mouse)
- Peromyscus gossypinus (Cotton Mouse)
- Peromyscus polionotus (Oldfield mouse)
- Podomys floridana, P. gossypinus (Florida mouse)
- Pronotolagus (rabbit)
- Reithrodontomys H. humulis (harvest mouse)
- Sciurus carolinensis (Eastern Grey Squirrel)
- Sigmodon, S. bakeri, S. hispidus, S. libitinus, S. minor (rat)
- Spermophilus (Ground Squirrel)
- Sylvilagus (Cottontail Rabbit), S. webbi
- Sylvilagus floridanus (Eastern Cottontail)
- Synaptomys, S. australis, S. morgani (lemming)
- Zapodidae (jumping mice)

== Moles and Shrews ==
- Blarina (American Short-Tailed Shrew)
- Blarina carolinensis (Southern Short-Tailed Shrew)
- Cryptotis parva (North American Least Shrew)
- Scalopus aquaticus (Eastern Mole)
- Sorex longirostris (Southeastern Shrew)

== Unclassified mammal ==
- Petauria

== Sea mammals ==
- Cynthiacetus maxwelli. (possibly pre-peninsular) ~37.2—33.9 Mya.
- Zygorhiza
