= Orange County, Florida paleontological sites =

The Orange County paleontological sites are assemblages of Late Pleistocene vertebrates occurring in Orange County, Florida.

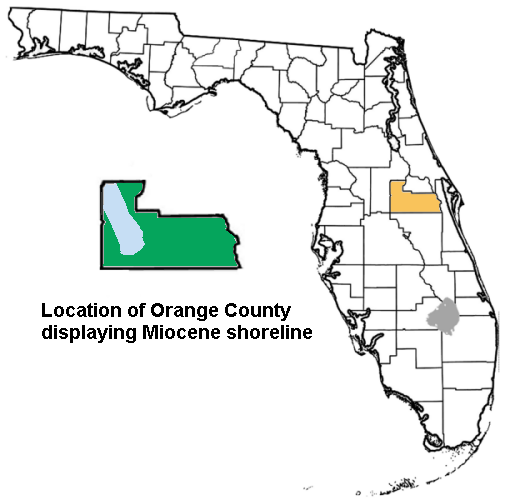
Orange County during the Miocene with most of the county as dry land.

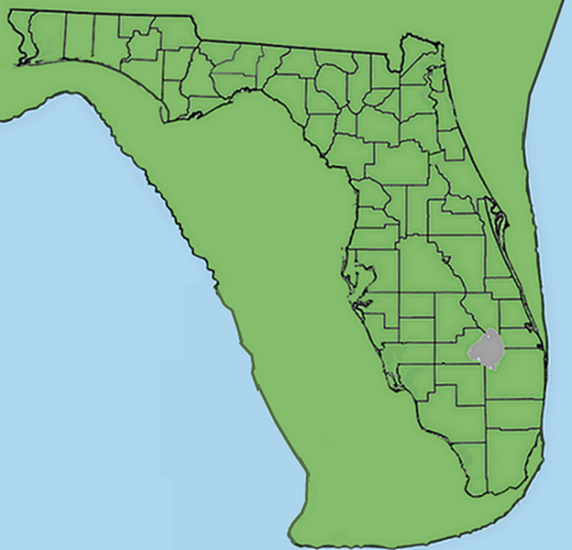
Florida during the Late Pleistocene 2 million to 10,000 years ago.

== Age ==
Era: Neogene
Period: Pleistocene
Faunal stage: Rancholabrean 126,000—11,000 years ago, calculates to a period of approximately 0.115 million years.

== Sites ==
- Rock Spring site (Pleistocene). Time period: ~126,000—11,000 thousand years ago. Specimens were collected by H. J. Gut, J. Mann, J. Todd, G. Lintner, circa 1939. The site was recorded as bone-bearing argillaceous sandstone overlaying Ocala Limestone containing macrofossils. "The bones are well mineralized, and most are unworn; frequent occurrence in association of bones from what appear to be the same individual indicates that the material has not been reworked." (Glen E. Woolfenden 1959).

Coordinates: 28.7°N 81.5°W

== Specimens ==
=== Birds ===
- Meleagris gallopavo (wild turkey)
- Mergus serrator (red-breasted merganser)
- Anas fulvigula (mottled duck)
- Anas crecca carolinensis (green-winged teal)
- Anas discors (blue-winged teal)
- Anas acuta (northern pintail duck)
- Aix sponsa (wood duck)
- Aythya collaris (ring-necked duck)
- Aythya affinis (lesser scaup duck)
- Gavia immer (great northern loon)
- Podiceps auritus (horned grebe)
- Podilymbus podiceps (pied-billed grebe)
- Nannopterum auritum (double-crested cormorant)
- Anhinga anhinga (snakebird)
- Ciconia maltha (extinct stork)
- Ajaia ajaja (roseate spoonbill)
- Botaurus lentiginosus (American bittern)
- Ardea herodias (great blue heron)
- Ardea alba (great egret)
- Nycticorax nycticorax (black-crowned night heron)
- Aramus guarauna (limpkin)
- Grus canadensis (sandhill crane)
- Fulica minor (coot)
- Limnodromus scolopaceus (long-billed dowitcher)
- Gallinula galeata (common gallinule)
- Larus (gull)
- Pandion haliaetus (osprey)
- Buteo jamaicensis (red-tailed hawk)
- Haliaetus leucocephalus (sea eagle)
- Strix varia (barred owl)
- Ectopistes migratorius (passenger pigeon)
- Megaceryle alcyon (belted kingfisher)
- Dendrocopos borealis (a woodpecker)
- Corvus ossifragus (fish crow)
- Cardinalis cardinalis (northern cardinal)

=== Mammals ===
- Paramylodon (ground sloth)
- Dasypus bellus (armadillo)
- Holmesina septentrionalis (armadillo-like Cingulata)
- Trichechus manatus Linnaeus (sea cow)
- Mammuthus (mammoth)
- Mammut americanum (American mastodon)
- Tapirus veroensis (tapir)
- Equus (horse)
- Mormoops megalophylla (bat)
- Myotis austroriparius (bat)
- Tremarctos floridanus (Florida cave bear)
- Ursus americanus (American black bear)
- Procyon lotor (raccoon)
- Aenocyon dirus (dire wolf)
- Urocyon cinereoargenteus (gray fox)
- Leopardus amnicola (margay)
- Puma concolor (puma)
- Mylohyus nasutus (peccary)
- Platygonus compressus Leconte (peccary)
- Odocoileus virginianus (deer)
- Bison (bison)
- Tursiops (bottlenose dolphin)
- Palaeolama mirifica (camel)
- Blarina carolinensis (shrew)
- Sylvilagus (rabbit)
- Thomomys orientalis (gopher)
- Geomys pinetis (pocket gopher)
- Castor (North American beaver)
- Reithrodontomys (harvest mouse)
