= Jefferson County, Florida paleontological sites =

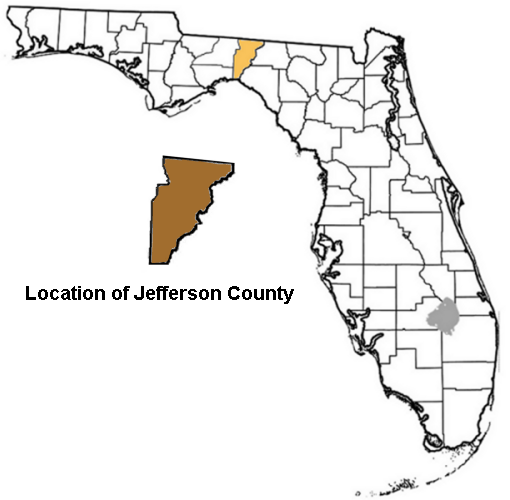
Jefferson County during the Miocene would have a shoreline dividing the county with land occupying the northern half.

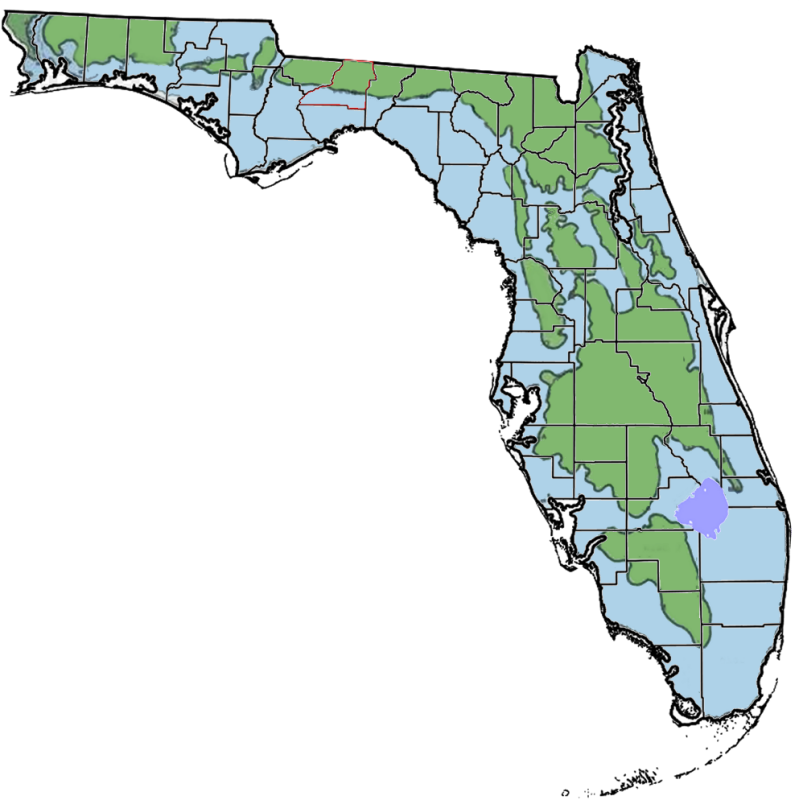
Florida during the Miocene

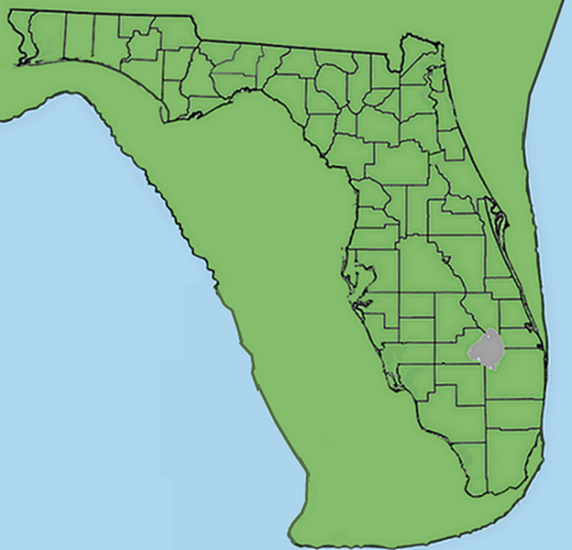
Florida during the Pleistocene

The Jefferson County, Florida paleontological sites are assemblages of Mid-Miocene to Late Pleistocene vertebrates from Jefferson County, Florida, United States.

== Age ==
Era: Neogene
Period: Miocene to Pleistocene, ~23.03 Mya—11,000 years ago. (calculates to a period of approximately 22.92 million years).
Faunal stage: Clarendonian through early Rancholabrean

== Sites ==
Ashville site (Miocene) Time period: ~13.5—12.7 Mya.
Aucilla River site (Pleistocene) Time period: ~126,000—11,000 years ago. The Aucilla site specimens were discovered by amateur paleontologist Dr. Richard Ohmes of Bremerton, Washington in 1969.
Coordinates: 30.1°N 83.9°W
Wacissa River site (Pleistocene) Time period: ~126,000—11,000 years ago. Collected by R. Alexon, B. Mathen, R. Gingery in October 1981; in shallow water. Specimens reposited in the Florida Museum of Natural History.
Coordinates: 30.4°N 83.9°W

Ashland site = ASH. Aucilla River site = ARS. Wacissa River site = WRS.

== Reptiles ==
- Emydidae (turtle) WRS
- Geochelone (tortoise) ARS
- Alligator WRS

== Birds ==
- Grus americana (whooping crane) ARS

== Mammals ==
- Artiodactyla (deer-like) ASH, ARS
- Bison antiquus (bison) WRS
- Calippus proplacidus ASH
- Camelops (camel) ARS
- Equus (horse) ARS, WRS
- Hemiauchenia (camel) WRS
- Hippotherium (horse) ASH
- Megalonyx (ground sloth) ARS
- Mammut (American mastodon) ARS
- Menoceratinae (rhinoceros)
- Tapirus (tapir) ARS
- Odocoileus virginianus (deer-like) WRS
- Palaeolama (llama) WRS
