= Melbourne Bone Bed =

Pleistocene fossil and archaeological site in Florida

Coordinates: 28.1°N 80.6°W

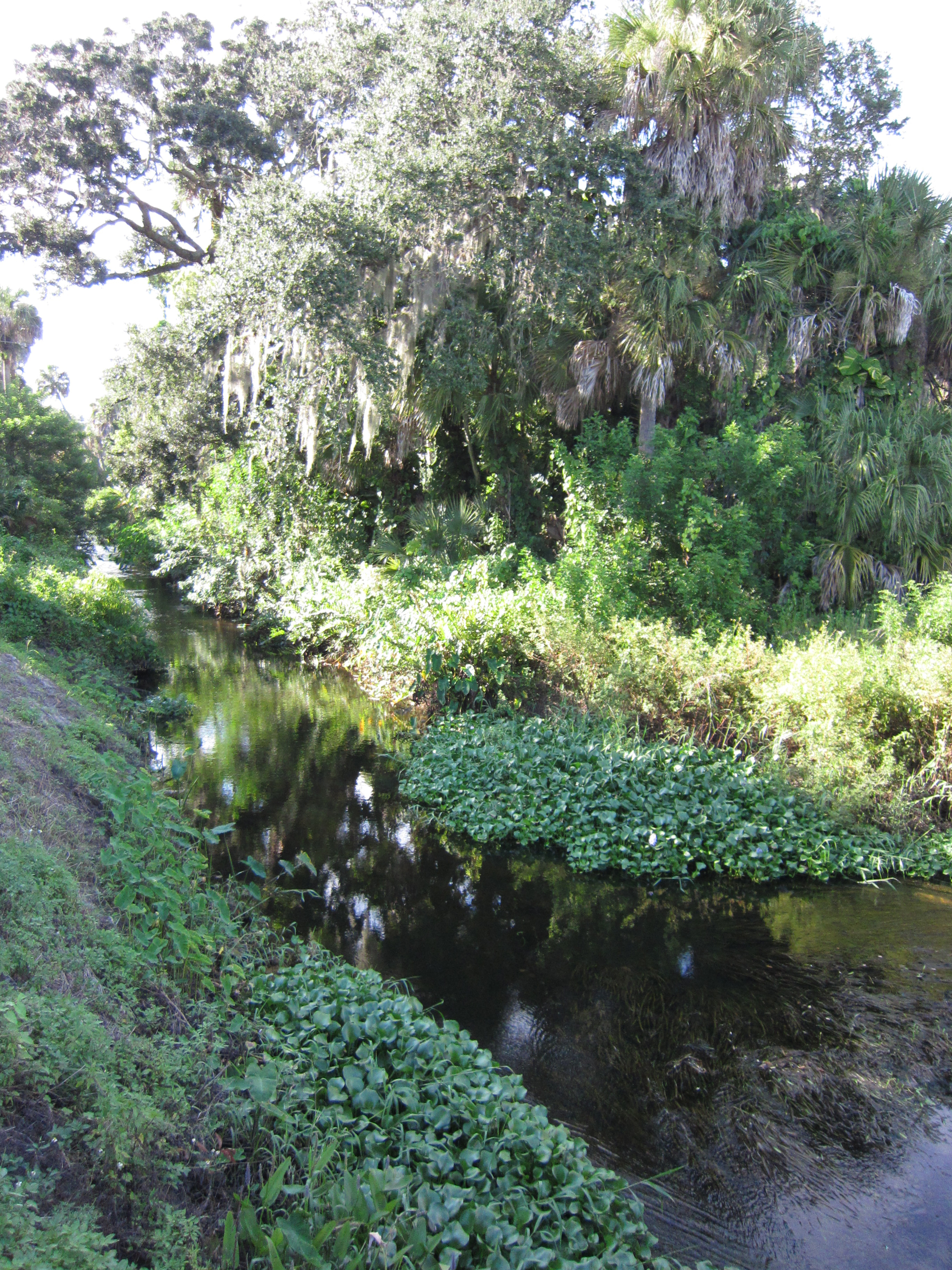
Fossil deposits from the Melbourne Bone Bed were discovered in a tributary of Crane Creek, similar to the one shown here.

Melbourne Bone Bed is a paleontological site located at Crane Creek in Melbourne, in the U.S. state of Florida. This site contains fossils from the Late Pleistocene period 20,000 to 10,000 years before the present. The fossils include extinct animals such as varieties of camels, dire wolves, Florida cave bears, giant armadillos, giant beavers, giant bison, giant ground sloths, mammoths, mastodons, saber-toothed cats, and tapirs.

The excavations were conducted at three sites; the Golf Course site on the east bank of Crane Creek on the Melbourne Golf and Country Club (south of West New Haven Avenue), the Singleton Estate site about 1 mile (1.6 km) southeast of the Golf Course site, and a minor site on the south bank of Crane Creek about 1 mile (1.6 km) west of the Golf Course site. C. P. Singleton discovered the bones of a mammoth (Mammuthus columbi) on his property along Crane Creek, 1.5 miles (2.4 km) from Melbourne, and brought in Amherst College paleontologist Frederick B. Loomis to excavate the skeleton. Loomis found a second elephant with a "large rough flint instrument" among fragments of the elephant's ribs. Loomis found in the same stratum mammoth, mastodon, horse, ground sloth, tapir, peccary, camel, and saber-tooth cat bones, all extinct in Florida since the end of the Pleistocene 10,000 years ago. At a nearby site a human rib and charcoal were found in association with Mylodon, Megalonyx, and Holmesina (formerly Chlamytherium) teeth. A finely worked spear point found with these items may have been displaced from a later stratum. In 1925 attention shifted to the Melbourne golf course. A crushed human skull with finger, arm, and leg bones was found in association with a horse tooth. A piece of ivory that appeared to have been modified by humans was found at the bottom of the stratum containing bones. Other finds included a spear point near a mastodon bone and a turtle-back scraper and blade found with bear, camel, mastodon, horse, and tapir bones. James Gidley of the Smithsonian Institution joined Loomis in 1926, and continued to collect from the site until 1929. C. P. Singleton also continued to collect from the Golf Course site when Loomis and Gidley were absent, reportedly with the permission of the Smithsonian and some funding from Harvard University. The Melbourne site has been described as "one of the "Big Three" late Pleistocene sites discovered in Florida during the first half of the 20th Century".

== Melbourne Man ==
The skull found at the Melbourne Golf Course was exhibited at the Paleontological Society of America meeting in 1925. This discovery sparked a 30-year debate between geologists and archaeologists resulting in the skull becoming known as the Melbourne Man. Recent consensus dates the Melbourne Man as early as 10,000 BC confirming that Native Americans coexisted with Pleistocene mammals in the area at the end of that period.

Human remains, Pleistocene animals and Paleo-Indian artifacts similar to those from the Melbourne Bone Bed were found in Vero Beach, 30 miles (48 km) south of Melbourne, and similar Paleo-Indian artifacts were found at the Helen Blazes archaeological site, 10 miles (16 km) southwest of Melbourne.

== See also ==
- Vero man
