= Crane Creek (Melbourne, Florida) =

River in Florida, United States

Coordinates: 28.0718773°N 80.6195645°W

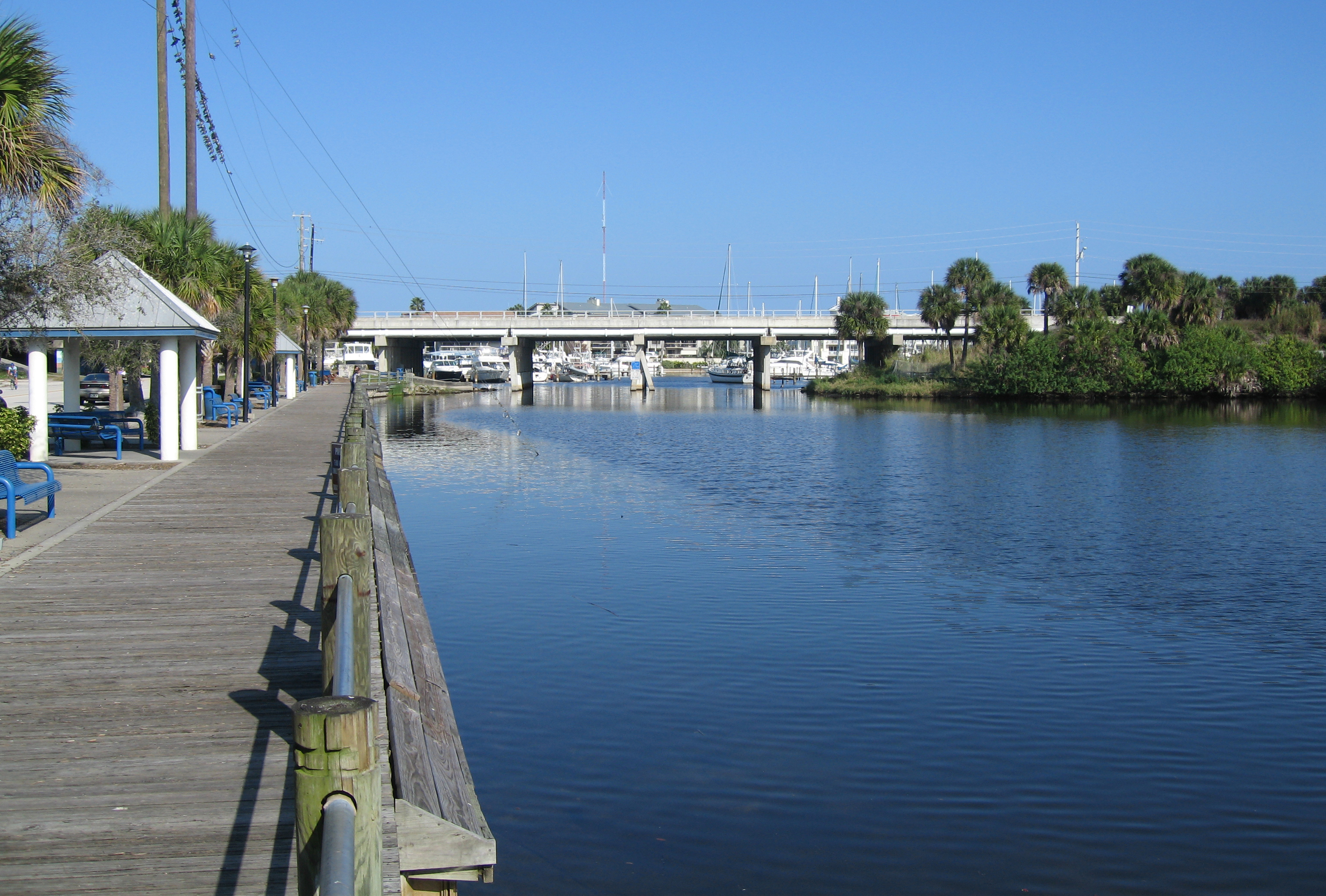
- Crane Creek & Crane Creek Promenade

Location
- Country: United States

Physical characteristics
- Source
  - location: Melbourne, Florida
- Mouth
  - location: Indian River

Crane Creek is a 3.3-mile-long (5.3 km) stream in Melbourne, Florida, United States. It is a tributary of the Indian River, with its mouth in the vicinity of Front Street.

== History ==
Evidence for the presence of Paleo-Indians in the Melbourne area during the late Pleistocene epoch was uncovered during the 1920s. C. P. Singleton, a Harvard University zoologist, discovered the bones of a Mammoth (Mammuthus columbi) on his property along Crane Creek, 1.5 miles (2.4 km) from Melbourne, and brought in Amherst College paleontologist Frederick B. Loomis to excavate the skeleton. Loomis found a second elephant, with a "large rough flint instrument" among fragments of the elephant's ribs. Loomis found in the same stratum mammoth, mastodon, horse, ground sloth, tapir, peccary, camel and saber-tooth cat bones, all extinct in Florida since the end of the Pleistocene 10,000 years ago. At a nearby site a human rib and charcoal were found in association with Mylodon, Megalonyx and Chlamytherium (ground sloths) teeth. A finely worked spearpoint found with these items may have been displaced from a later stratum. In 1925 attention shifted to the Melbourne golf course. A crushed human skull with finger, arm and leg bones was found in association with a horse tooth. A piece of ivory that appeared to have been modified by humans was found at the bottom of the stratum containing bones. Other finds included a spear point near a mastodon bone and a turtle-back scraper and a blade found with bear, camel, mastodon, horse and tapir bones. Similar human remains, Pleistocene animals and Paleo-Indian artifacts have been found in the general locale, consistent with these discoveries.

=== Early settlement ===
Crane Creek greatly influenced the development of the area. Prior to the development of Melbourne, hunters used Crane Creek to gain entrance into the interior. In 1867, by Wright Brothers, Balaam Allen and Peter Wright, all ex-slaves, became the first pioneers in Melbourne. They settled in the area around Crane Creek, which became the present day Historic Downtown area on the east end of New Haven Avenue near Front Street.

The settlement was first named "Crane Creek" but was renamed after the American Civil War.

Until 1893, transportation to and in Brevard, was laborious, clumsy, and time-consuming. That year, Flagler built a railway through the county, which transcended all other means of transportation until the arrival of autos and paved roads in the 1920s.

=== Twentieth century canal development ===
As early as 1912, the area surrounding Crane Creek was being advertised as prime real estate for agricultural development, and efforts were already underway to enact drainage projects in the area. By 1919, Chapter 298 of the Florida state statutes was enacted, allowing for the creation of drainage improvement districts. Two year later, on April 5, 1922, the Crane Creek Drainage Improvement District was officially filed by the Secretary of State of Florida, and bids were sought in the summer of 1922 to begin canal development. Through 1927, the initial canal construction resulted in the building of what would become the Crane Creek Canal (M-1), along with various feeder canals. The new canals drained an area previously part of the St. Johns River basin (west of the low Atlantic Coastal Ridge), redirecting the flow of water eastward into Crane Creek and ultimately the Indian River. The interbasin canal diversions are estimated to have added 5,040 acres to Crane Creek's watershed.

Presently, the Crane Creek Canal (M-1) runs from Sarno Road south along I-95 to just north of US 192 before heading east and eventually merging into Crane Creek on the campus of Florida Tech, just west of SR 507 Babcock Street. The Crane Creek Canal is fed by multiple secondary and leveling canals designated L-1 to L-16.

== Current development ==
Florida Institute of Technology's construction development after its establishment in 1958 eventually expanded into Crane Creek. Crane Creek currently runs adjacent to Florida Tech's Student Union Building, Brownlie Hall, as well as Florida Tech's Botanical Gardens.

== See also ==
- Florida Institute of Technology
- Indian River (Florida)
- Melbourne Bone Bed
