= Devil's Den Cave =

Sinkhole/underground river in Florida, United States

Devil’s Den
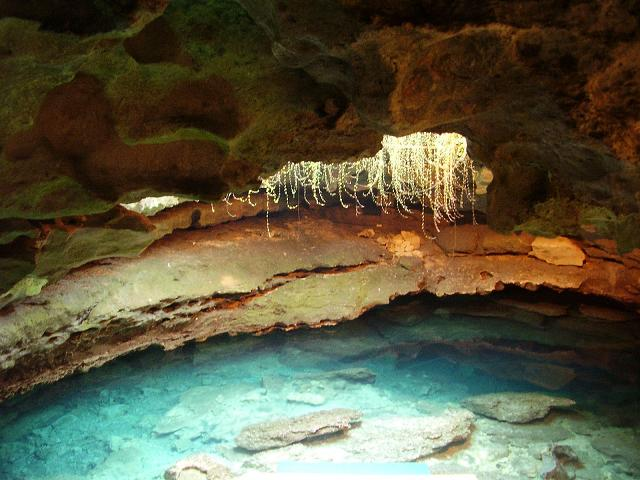
- Looking through the 'window' at the pool in Devil's Den
- Interactive map of Devil’s Den
- Coordinates: 29°24′27″N 82°28′35″W
- Spring source: Floridan aquifer
- Elevation: 60 ft (18 m)
- Magnitude: first-magnitude spring
- Temperature: 72 °F (22 °C)
- Depth: 66 ft (20 m)

Devil's Den is a solution sinkhole near Williston, Florida. It has a small opening in the ground leading to a large cavern, partially filled with water.

A large number of fossils of extinct pleistocene animals have been found in association with human remains and artifacts in an underwater passage leading from the cavern. The site is privately owned and operated as a SCUBA diving training and recreational facility.

== Description ==
The water in the underground river is geothermally warmed at a constant 72 °F (22 °C) degrees. In cold weather, water vapor rising from the surface of the river forms a visible plume above the entrance to the cave, which suggested a chimney from Hell to early settlers. The opening to the surface was originally a small solution sinkhole, through which visitors had to squeeze to reach the water. The opening was enlarged in the 1990s to ease access. The cave expands below water level (a shape described as an "inverted mushroom"). The diameter of the cave at the surface of the water is about 100 feet (30 m), while underwater the cave is up to 200 feet (61 m) across. The water level in the cave has fallen along with the water table in the area. However, as of 2018, the water level has risen above the main stage/platform. The cave was opened to the public as a dive site in the early 1990s. The depth of the water is more than 20 metres (66 ft).

== Geology ==
The entrance to Devil's Den is a karst window, in which the roof over a subterranean river has collapsed, exposing the water to the open surface. The karst window is much smaller than the cavern, and may have formed geologically recently. Four underwater passages extend from the pool under the opening, from 5 feet (1.5 m) to 90 feet (27 m) under the surface of the water as of 1975. Devil's Den was probably dry during the late Pleistocene (late Wisconsin glaciation) when the sea level and local water table were very low.

== Paleontology ==
Paleontologists conducted at least 96 dives into Devil's Den in 1960, the only time it has been extensively studied by scientists. The passage called chamber 3, 70 feet (21 m) under water, contained animal and human remains and artifacts. The animal remains, which appeared to be associated with the human remains and artifacts, were from extinct (Pleistocene) species, including 47 species of mammals such as mastodons, ground sloths, camels, horses, dire wolves, bog lemmings, Florida spectacled bears, saber-toothed cats, and peccaries, as well as many fish, amphibian, reptile, and bird fossils. The relative abundance of various species of mammals suggests that the land over the cavern at the end of the Pleistocene was an area of mesic forest surrounded by a xeric savanna. As of 2008 the human remains had not been systematically studied and the location of the recovered artifacts was not known.

Most of the fossils of extinct animals were found in a layer initially dated to about 8,000 years ago, while some were found in a slightly younger surface layer. In both cases, the date of deposition of the fossils was described as either very late glacial or very early post-glacial. A more recent study analyzing rare earth elements in the bones found in the cave concluded that the bones of humans and of Pleistocene animals were of about the same age, and must correspond to the terminal Pleistocene.

== Sources ==
- Martin, Robert A.; Webb, S. David (1975). "Late Pleistocene Mammals from the Devil's Den Fauna, Levy County". In Webb, S. David (ed.). Pleistocene Mammals of Florida. Gainesville, Florida: University Presses of Florida. ISBN 9780813003610.
- Morgan, Gary S.; Seymour, Kevin L. (October 1997). "Fossil history of the Panther (Puma concolor) and the cheetah-like cat (Miracinonyx inexpectatus) in Florida". Bulletin of the Florida Museum of Natural History. 40 (2): 177–219. doi:10.58782/flmnh.emto6774.
- Purdy, Barbara A. (2008). Florida's People During the Last Ice Age. Gainesville, Florida: University Press of Florida. ISBN 978-0-8130-3204-7.
