= Vero man =

Late Pleistocene human fossil in Florida, USA

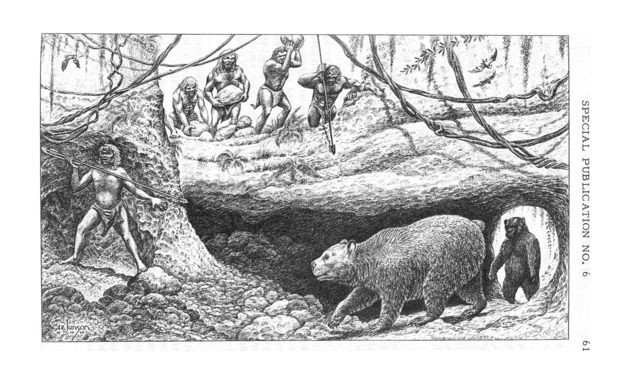
Artist's conception of Pleistocene Vero Man hunters and two Florida cave bears (Tremarctos floridanus).

Vero Man was a Paleo-Indian man whose fossilized bones were found near Vero (now Vero Beach), Florida, in 1915 and 1916. The human bones were found in association with those of Pleistocene animals. Pleistocene dates range from 2,580,000 to 11,700 years ago. The suggestion that humans might have been present in Florida (or anywhere in the Americas) during the Pleistocene was controversial at the time and most of the contemporary archaeologists did not accept that the Vero fossils could be that old. Recent studies show that, in fact, the Vero human bones are from the Pleistocene.

== Initial discovery ==
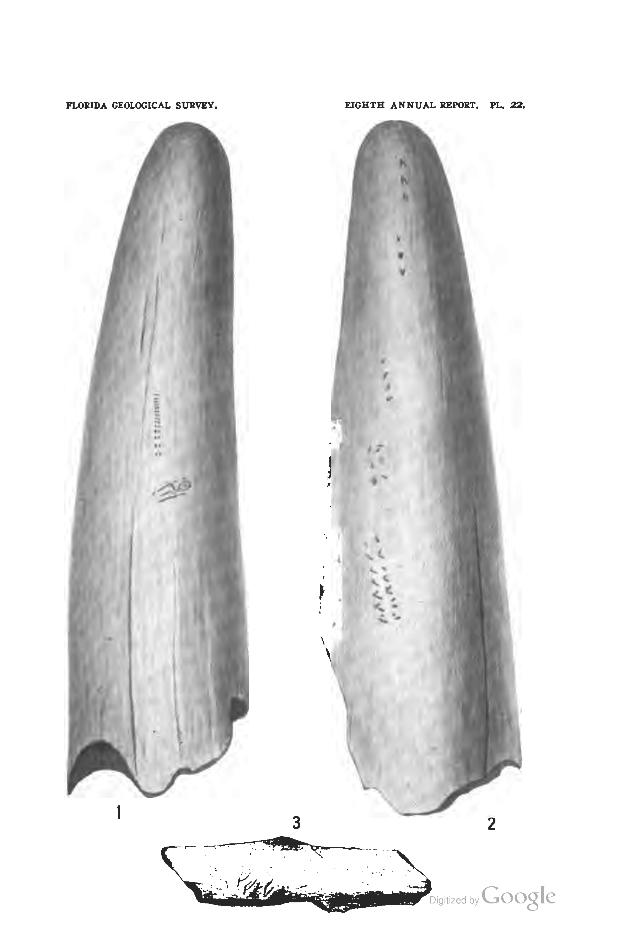
Mammoth or mastodon tusk with marks presumed to have been made by humans, found by E. H. Sellards at the Vero Man site in 1916

Starting in late 1913, vertebrate fossils were uncovered during the construction of a drainage canal from the Indian River between Vero and Gifford. Samples of the fossils were sent by Isaac M. Weills and Frank Ayers to the state geologist of Florida, E. H. Sellards, who recognized the finds as Pleistocene animals. In 1915, 26 fossilized human bones and fragments were found in the banks of the canal. The following year Sellards conducted his own excavations at the site, recovering an engraved mammoth tusk and a bird bone with marks possibly made by humans. In a nearby location he recovered human bones from the stratum that contained Pleistocene fossils. Sellards also found chert flakes and bone tools, including what appears to be a broken stemmed Archaic projectile point, and near the surface, he found a few ceramic sherds.

Sellards first published his findings in 1916. He invited other scientists to visit the Vero site in order to investigate it themselves in October 1916 and in March 1917. Aleš Hrdlička, T. Wayland Vaughan, Oliver Perry Hay, George Grant MacCurdy, and Rollin Thomas Chamberlin visited and examined the site. Sellards and Hay concluded that the human bones dated from the Pleistocene. Hrdlička, MacCurdy, and Chamberlin argued that the human bones were much more recent, while Vaughan felt that more evidence was needed before making a decision. Hrdlička, the most prominent physical anthropologist in America at the time, was firmly convinced that humans had not arrived in America until well after the Pleistocene had ended.

Human bones, artifacts, and/or human-modified animal bones in a Pleistocene context now have been found elsewhere in Florida, including at the nearby Helen Blazes and Melbourne Bone Bed sites.

== Later discoveries ==
The human bones excavated by Sellards were passed around various institutions for study. By the time carbon-14 dating of fossils became possible, about 35 years after the discovery of Vero Man, some of the bones had been lost, and others had been rendered unusable for such testing due to the way they had been preserved with chemicals.

In 2009, scientists announced the discovery of a carving of a mammoth or mastodon or—although not considered so likely—a giant sloth, on a piece of bone found north of Vero Beach (the general area in which Vero Man was found). The carving may be among the oldest art found in the Americas. Scientists studying the carving noted similarities with Pleistocene art in Europe. Art historian Barbara Olins Alpert has noted that similarity does not prove connection, as finely executed realistic art styles have appeared in various times and places.

In 2014, new excavations at the site of the discovery of Vero Man were undertaken by Mercyhurst University and the Old Vero Ice Age Sites Committee, a local nonprofit organization. The Old Vero Ice Age Sites Committee announced the discovery of a possible "human living surface" at least 12,000 years old during the 2014 excavation season. Excavations continued into 2015 at the site, with finds including 14,000 year-old charred bones from both a dire wolf and a horse, possibly from a hearth. The archaeologists from Mercyhurst University withdrew from excavations at the Old Vero Man site in Vero Beach after 2015. Starting in 2016, archaeologists from Florida Atlantic University joined the Old Vero Man site excavations.
