= Inner Space Cavern =

Cave in Georgetown, Texas, United States

- Laubach Cave
- Interactive map of Inner Space Cavern
- Coordinates: 30°36′28″N 97°41′16″W
- Website: https://innerspacecavern.com/

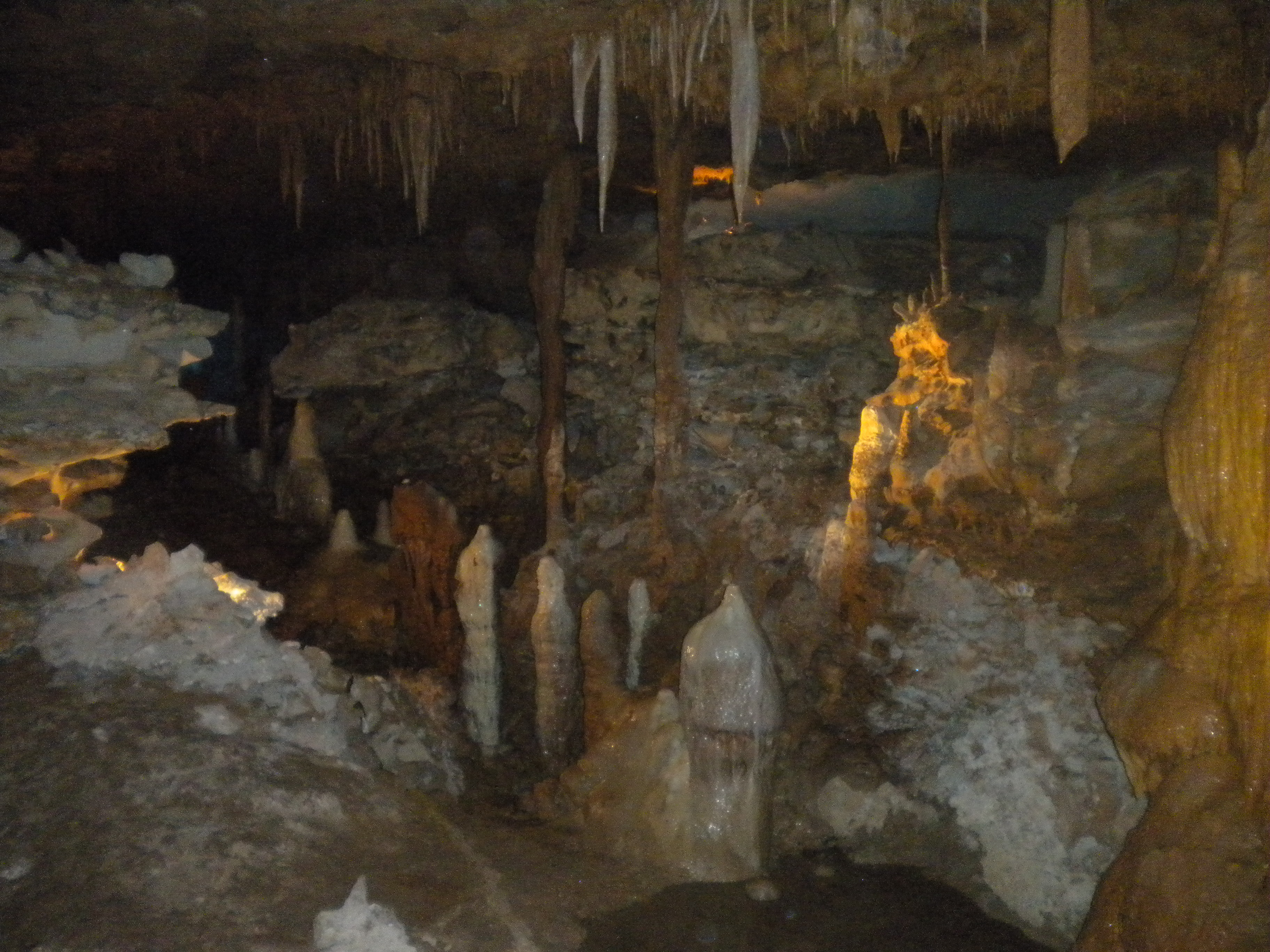
View of the Ice Cream Parlor (First Formation Room), Inner Space Cavern, Georgetown, Texas

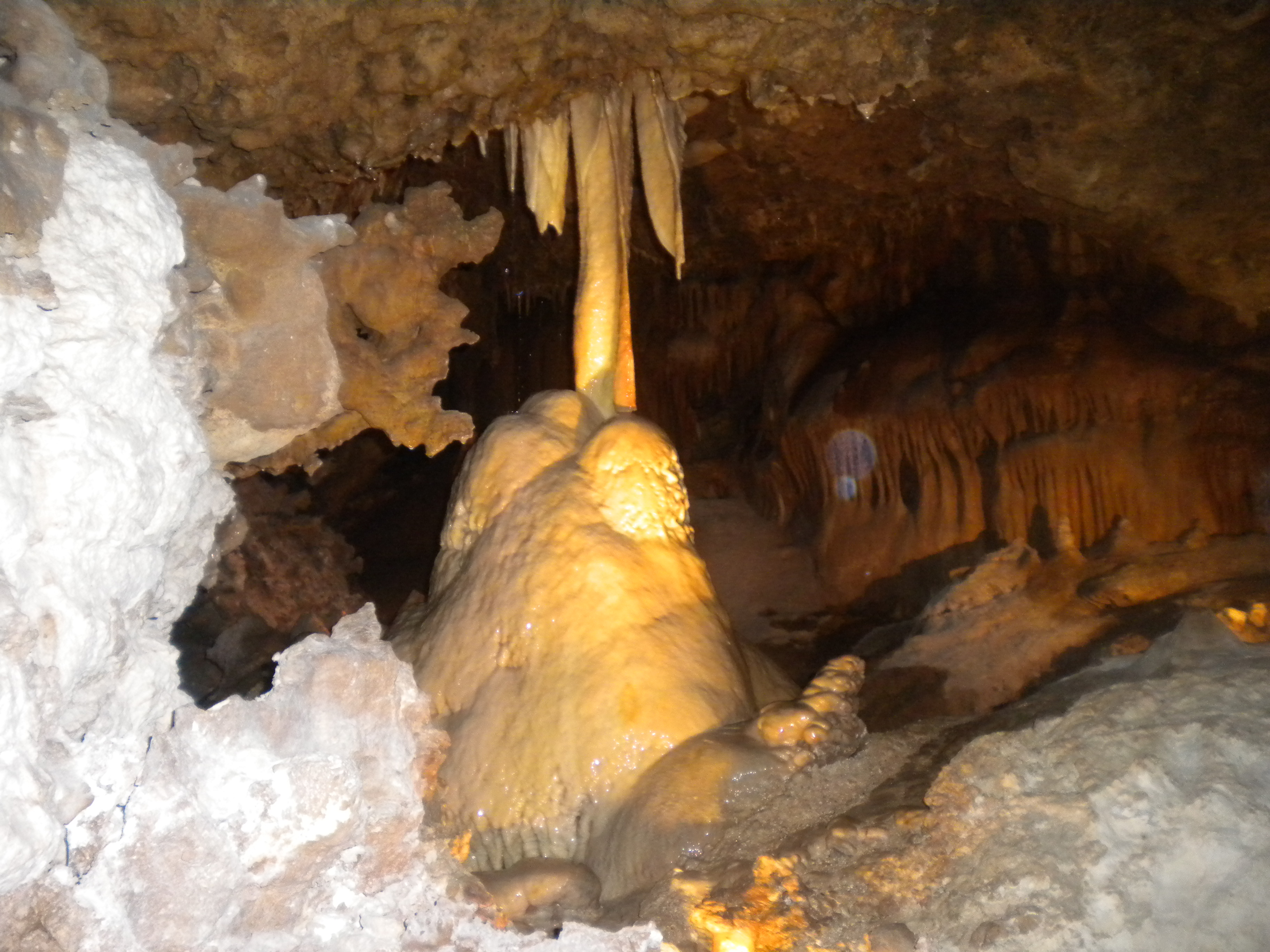
Drapery Column, Inner Space Cavern, Georgetown, Texas

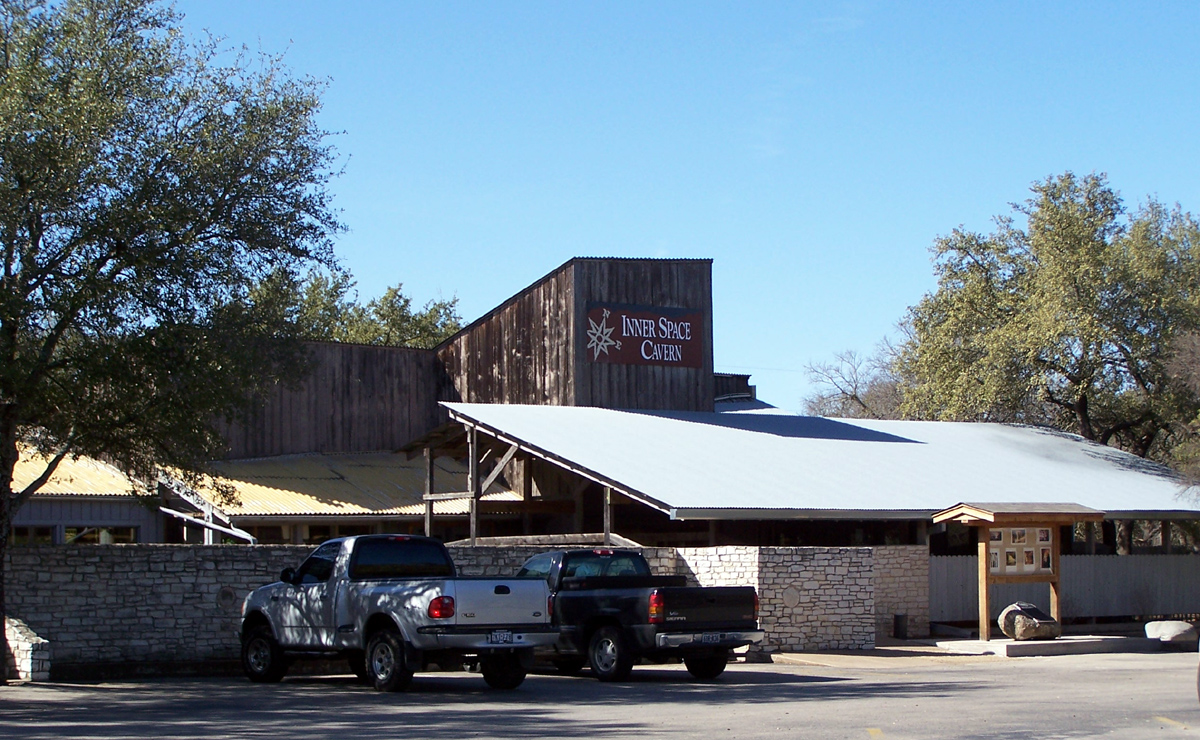
The main entrance to Inner Space Cavern in 2005

Inner Space Cavern (Also known as Laubach Cave) is a karst cave located in Georgetown, Texas. The cavern was formed by water passing through Edwards limestone. The cavern is estimated to be around 12–25 million years old but was open to the surface during the late Pleistocene period 10,000–45,000 years ago. It was discovered by the Texas Highway Department in 1963.

== Geology ==
=== Speleogenesis ===
Inner Space Cavern lies within limestone and dolomite rocks of the Edwards Group formed during the Cretaceous period. Following the formation of the Balcones Fault, a series of vertical fractures through the Edwards Formations allowed ground water to freely move through the limestone marking the beginning of the cavern's formation. As water from the surface became ground water, carbon dioxide (CO_{2}) was picked up from the atmosphere and from decaying organic matter, creating carbonic acid (H_{2}CO_{3}), which would react with and dissolve the limestone rocks creating voids. Over millions of years these voids grew leaving behind large rooms and passages.

=== Fossil Record ===
There were several large openings to the caverns during the Ice Age, an evidence of several skeletons of prehistoric Ice-Age animals including a baby mammoth, giant sloth and the saber-toothed tiger have been found in the cavern; many were trapped in the cavern after they fell through the opening, unable to escape, and others drowned in thick, quicksand-like mud at the bottom of watering holes. Some filled-in sinkholes have been found, including the prehistoric entrance to the cavern. All natural entrances closed approximately 14,000 years ago.

== Discovery ==
Inner Space Cavern was discovered by the Texas Highway Department drilling team in the spring of 1963, during the construction of an overpass for Interstate 35. The cavern was mapped for the first time by the Texas Speleological Association in 1963; since then, several miles of the cavern's passage have been surveyed, with many sections of the cavern remaining unexplored, due to filled-in areas being blocked.

== Tourist attraction ==
The cavern was opened to the public in 1966. Three different levels of tours are available, ranging from a basic walking guided tour to an advanced wild cave spelunking tour, with over 1.2 miles of passage being open to the public. However, non-public passages are well-guarded and independent exploration is not allowed. Apart from the main entrance, which was created by dynamite blasts, a vertical borehole, located in the Inner Cathedral Room, serves as an emergency entryway/exit and a means for ventilating the cavern.
