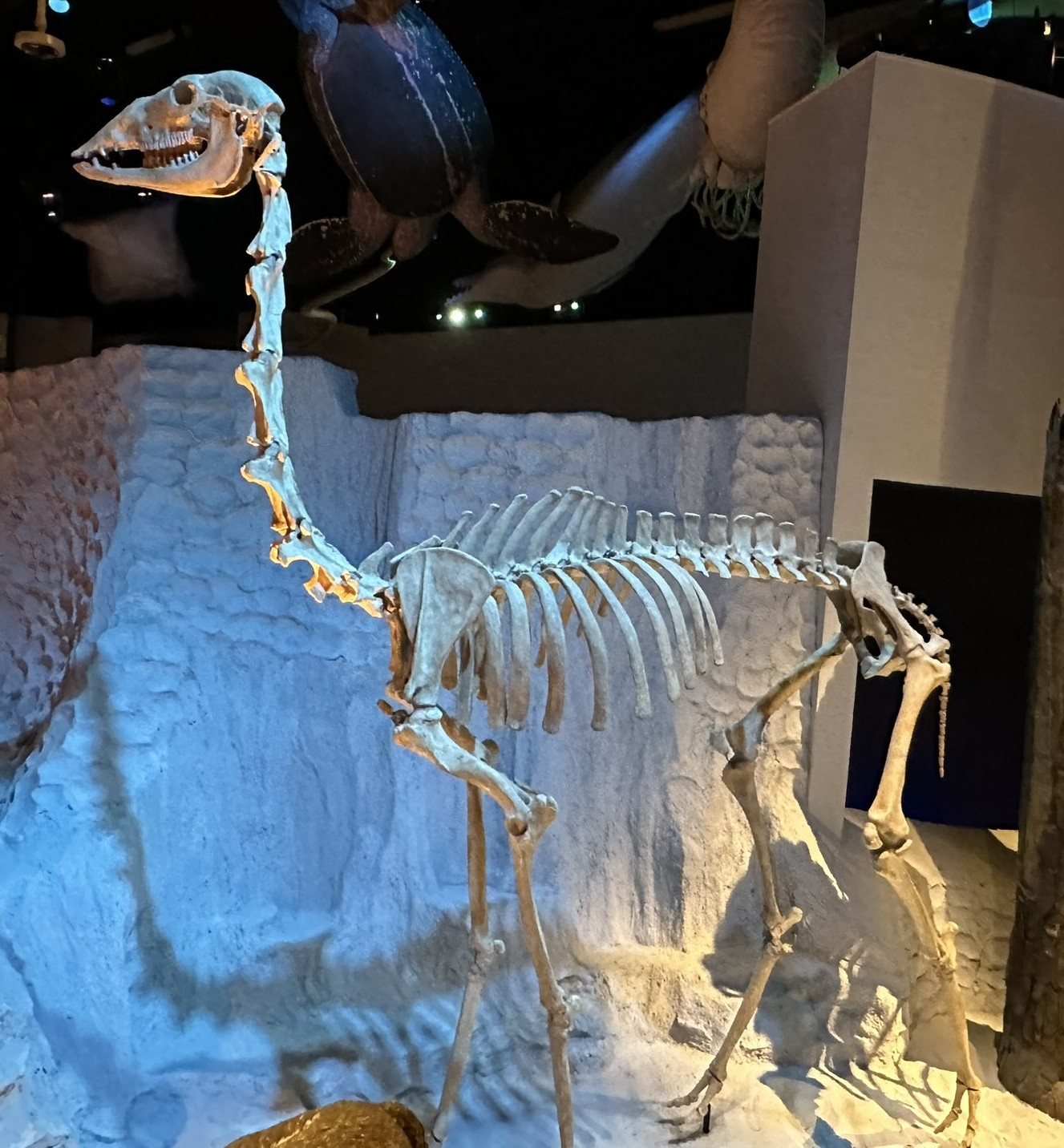
- Reconstructed H. macrocephala skeleton, Florida Museum of Natural History

Scientific classification
- Kingdom: Animalia
- Phylum: Chordata
- Class: Mammalia
- Order: Artiodactyla
- Family: Camelidae
- Tribe: Lamini
- Genus: †Hemiauchenia; Gervais & Ameghino, 1880

Species
- H. macrocephala (Cope, 1893); H. minima (Leidy, 1886); H. blancoensis (Meade,1945); H. vera (Matthew, 1909); H. paradoxa (Gervais & Ameghino, 1880); H. seymourensis; H. edensis; H. guanajuatensis; H. mirim Greco et al., 2022

Synonyms
- Tanupolama Stock 1928 Holomeniscus Cope 1884

= Hemiauchenia =

Hemiauchenia Temporal range: Mid Miocene – Late Pleistocene c. 10.3 – 0.012 Ma

Extinct genus of camelids

Hemiauchenia is an extinct genus of lamine camelids that evolved in North America in the Miocene epoch about 10 million years ago. This genus diversified and entered South America in the Late Pliocene about three to two million years ago, as part of the Great American Biotic Interchange. The genus became extinct at the end of the Pleistocene. The monophyly of the genus has been considered questionable, with phylogenetic analyses finding the genus to paraphyletic or polyphyletic, with some species suggested to be more closely related to living lamines (llamas and relatives) than to other Hemiauchenia species.

This genus gave rise to the genus Lama, to which modern lamines belong.

== Broad features of genus Hemiauchenia ==
The genus name is derived from the Ancient Greek: ἡμι- (hēmi-, "half"-) and αὐχήν (auchēn, "neck"). (Note: These are used to form a feminine noun to mean "half-neckedness" or "half-carrying the neck"; cf. ὑψηλαυχενία, (hypsēlauchenía, "carrying the neck high").) Species are specified using Latin adjectives or Latinised names from other languages.

=== North American fossils ===
Restoration of Hemiauchenia of the Rattlesnake Formation fleeing a volcanic eruption

Remains of these species have been found in assorted locations around North America, including Florida, Texas, Kansas, Nebraska, Arizona, Mexico, California, Oklahoma, New Mexico, Oregon, Colorado, and Washington.

The "large-headed llama", H. macrocephala, was widely distributed in North and Central America, with H. vera being known from the western United States and northern Mexico. H. minima has been found in Florida, and H. guanajuatensis in Mexico.

H. macrocephala gave rise to modern lamines (guanacos, vicuñas, and their domesticated forms) when a population migrated southward towards South America.

=== South American fossils ===
Fossil skull of the type species, H. paradoxa

Fossils of Hemiauchenia in South America are restricted to the Pleistocene and have been found in the Luján and Agua Blanca Formations of Buenos Aires Province and Córdoba Province, Argentina, the Tarija Formation of Bolivia, Pilauco of Osorno, Los Lagos, Chile and Paraíba, Ceará, and the Touro Passo Formation of Rio Grande do Sul, Brazil. Hemiauchenia paradoxa is suggested to have been a browser.

== Distinguishing characteristics of members of Hemiauchenia ==
=== H. vera ===
- Relatively low-crowned teeth (part of visible teeth ends close to gums)
- Large caniniform (canine-like) upper first premolar
- Retention of lower third premolar

=== H. blancoensis ===
- Named for Blancan Age stratum where typically found
- Shorter mandibular diastema (teeth-spacing between incisors and molars) than H. macrocephala and H. vera
- Caniniform upper first premolar
- Absent second premolar
- Upper third premolar present or absent
- Lower crowned molars

=== H. macrocephala ===
Skull of H. macrocephala

- Possesses a larger skull relative to other species
- Long, robust limbs
- Large skeletal size
- Presence of a deciduous upper second premolar
- Fully molariform deciduous second premolar (its infant bicuspids were like molars)
- High-crowned molars
- Thick layer of cementum on the teeth
- Broad mandibular symphysis (line where the bones of the jaw join together) with incisors in a vertical fashion

Thought to have been browsers and mixed feeders. Suggested to be less closely related to modern Lama and Vicugna than H. paradoxa is.

Native to the southern United States, spanning from California to Florida, and as far north as Nebraska. Also present in Mexico.

=== H. minima ===
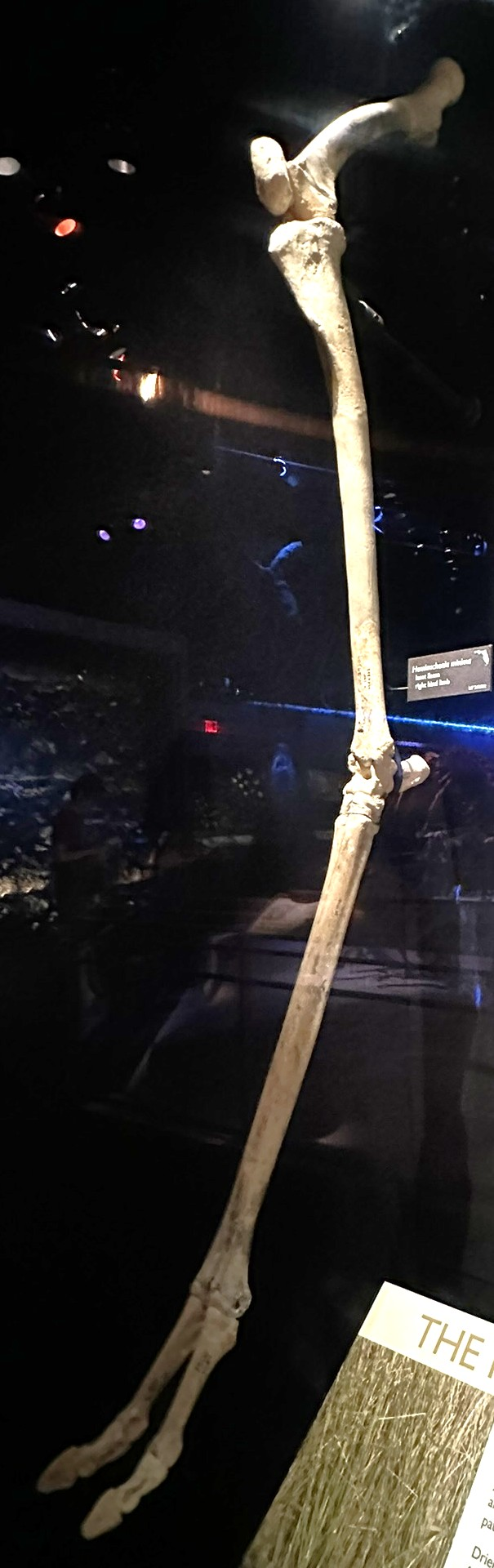
Right hind limb of H. minima, Florida Museum of Natural History

- Despite being the earliest recognized species, general distinguishing characteristics for H. minima are little known.

=== Other species ===
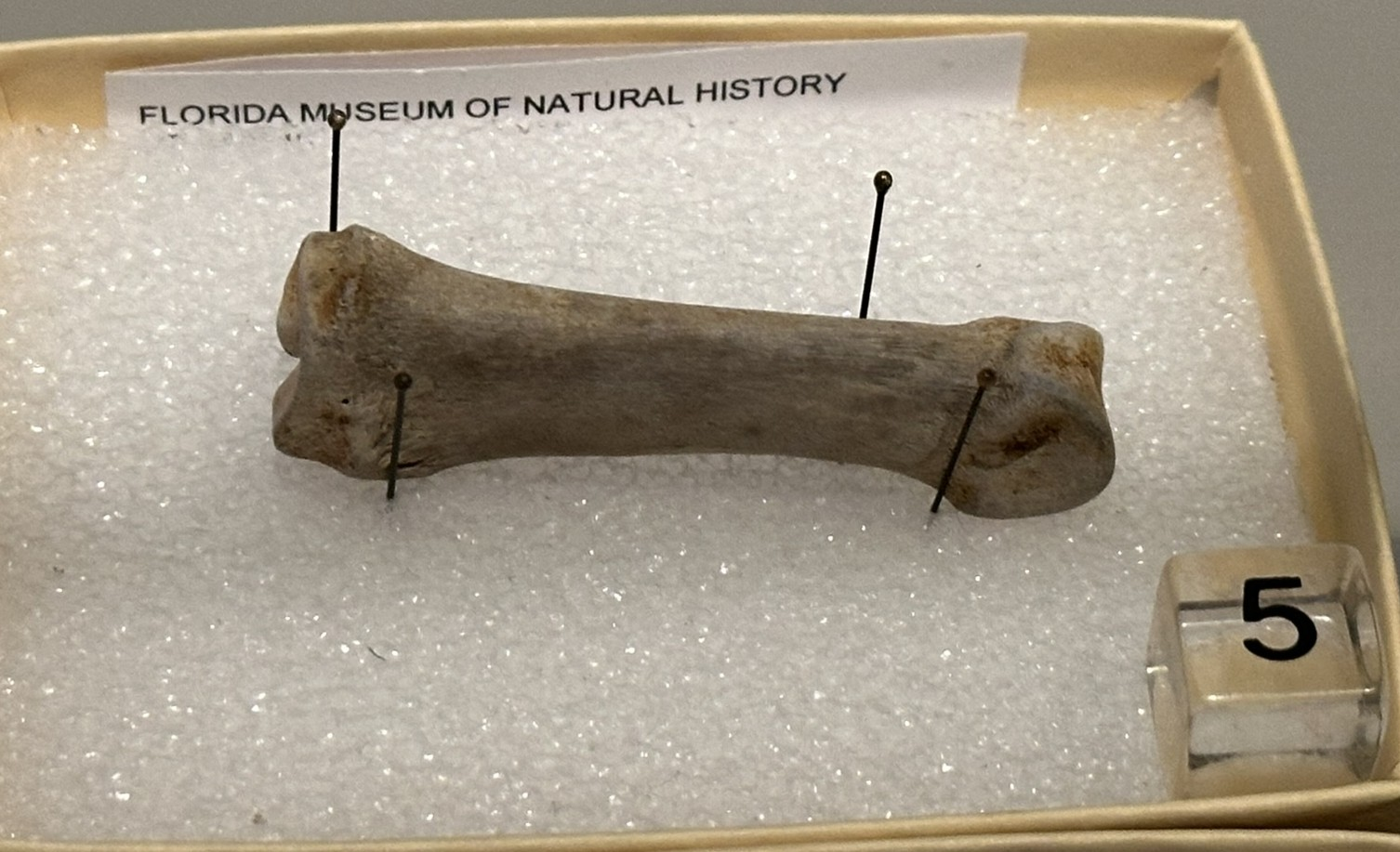
Toe bone of H. edensis, Florida Museum of Natural History

Also, a few lesser known species, such as H. paradoxa, H. seymourensis, H. edensis and H. guanajuatensis, have been found. Depending on which source is consulted, these may or may not be considered legitimate taxa.

== Classification history ==
Prior to 1974, fossil specimens now thought to be Hemiauchenia were classified as Holomeniscus, Lama, and Tanupolama, until S. David Webb proposed that these North and South American fossil species were part of a single genus. This has been widely followed by subsequent researchers. In 2013, Carolina Saldanha Scherer questioned the inclusion of a certain North American species and suggested that Hemiauchenia is paraphyletic. A 2020 cladistical analysis also found Hemiauchenia to be paraphyletic, with H. paradoxa being more closely related to living lamines than H. macrocephala, with Palaeolama being more closely related to H. paradoxa and living lamines than to H. macrocepala.

== Diet ==
Over the Pliocene and Pleistocene, Hemiauchenia was an intermediate feeder that preferred browsing with a hypsodont dentition. In Florida, Hemiauchenia populations were predominantly strict C_{3} browsers before the Blancan-Irvingtonian boundary but shifted towards a mixed feeding diet at the start of the Irvingtonian, a dietary shift coinciding with the arrival of Mammuthus in North America. This dietary shift has proposed to have been caused by floral changes as well as potentially by the ecosystem engineering of Mammuthus increasing the prevalence of open habitats. However, paired analysis of dental microwear and mesowear of H. macrocephala specimens from the Blancan of west-central Mexico show that it had a mixed feeding or non-strict grazing diet that was highly variable, likely indicating a highly heterogeneous environment in the region. According to δ^{13}C analysis of Hemiauchenia from Térapa in northeastern Sonora, which had a humid and equable climate relative to the present day, it was a C_{3} browser. δ^{13}C analyses of H. paradoxa teeth from the Touro Passo and Santa Vitória Formations of Brazil indicate H. paradoxa was primarily a grazer of C_{3} grasses.
