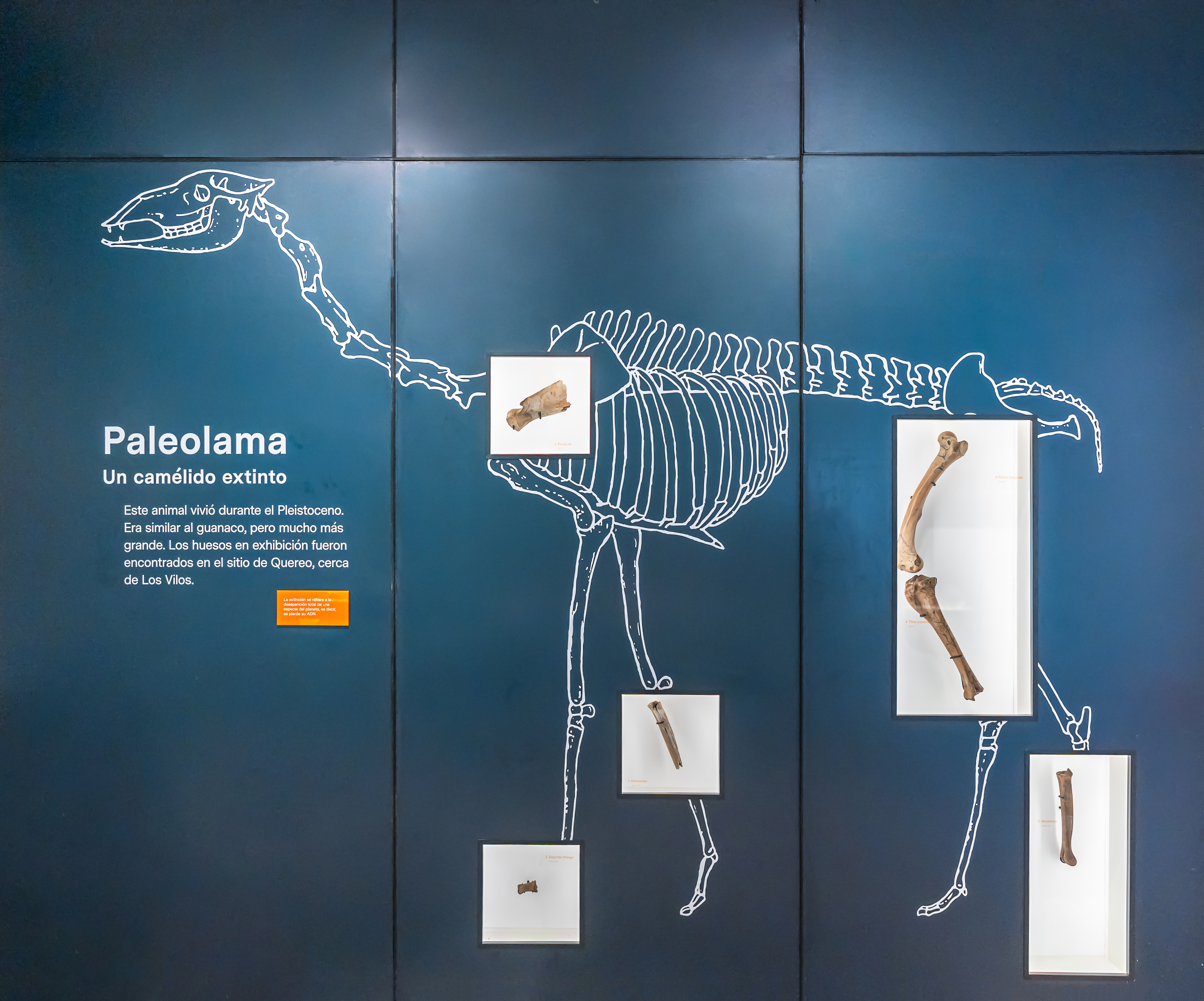
- Palaeolama fossils

Scientific classification
- Kingdom: Animalia
- Phylum: Chordata
- Class: Mammalia
- Order: Artiodactyla
- Family: Camelidae
- Subfamily: Camelinae
- Tribe: Lamini
- Genus: †Palaeolama; Gervais, 1869

Type species
- †Palaeolama weddeli Gervais, 1855

Species
- †P. aequatorialis (Hoffstetter, 1952) †P. brevirostris (Rusconi, 1930) †P. crassa (Hoffstetter, 1952) †P. crequii (Boule & Thévenin, 1920) †P. leptognata (Ameghino, 1889) †P. major (Liais, 1872) †P. mirifica (Simpson, 1929) †P. niedae (Guérin & Faure, 1999) †P. paradoxa (Cabrera, 1935) †P. promesolithica (Ameghino, 1889) †P. reissi (Branco, 1883) †P. weddelli (Gervais, 1855)

= Palaeolama =

Palaeolama Temporal range: Pleistocene to Holocene 1.9–0.0034 Ma

Extinct genus of mammals

Palaeolama (lit. 'ancient llama') is an extinct genus of lamine camelids that existed from the Pleistocene to the Holocene (1.9 to 0.0034 Ma). Their range extended from North America to the intertropical region of South America.

== Description ==
Palaeolama species were relatives of modern lamines that lived in the New World from the Pleistocene around 1.9 million years ago to potentially the Holocene epoch around 3,353–4,231 years cal. Before Present (BP). Fossil evidence suggests that it had a slender head, elongated snout, and stocky legs. They likely weighed around 200 kilograms (440 lb) or up to 300 kilograms (660 lb), surpassing the weight of modern llamas. They were specialized forest browsers and are often found in association with early equids, tapirs, deer, and mammoth.

=== Skull ===
Palaeolama had a long, slender skull with an elongated rostrum and robust jaw. This morphology more closely resembles the cranial morphology of Hemiauchenia than that of modern llamas.

=== Dental ===
The jaw and dental morphology of Palaeolama species distinguish them from other laminae. They tend to have a comparatively more dorsoventrally gracile mandible. Like Hemiauchenia, Palaeolama species lack second deciduous premolars and can further be differentiated by the distinct size and shape of their third deciduous premolars. Their dentition has also been described as more brachyodont-like (short crowns, well-developed roots).

=== Postcranial ===
Analyses of their limb elements reveal that they had shorter, stockier metapodials, and longer epipodials, giving them a short, stocky appearance. Limbs such as these are typically associated with organisms adapted to walking on uneven and rugged terrains. This is also suggestive of being well-adapted to avoiding predators in forested areas.

== Paleobiology ==
=== Diet ===
Various dietary analyses have concluded that Palaeolama was a specialized forest browser that relied almost exclusively on plants high in C_{3} for subsistence. Additionally, its shallow jaw and brachydont "cheek teeth" are highly suggestive of a mixed or intermediate seasonal diet consisting of primarily leaves and fruits, with some grass. Microwear analyses further validate this dietary interpretation. Analysis of δ^{13}C values from P. major remains in northeastern Brazil confirm it was primarily a consumer of C_{3} plant matter. In the Melbourne Beds of Florida, P. mirifica shows evidence of being a leaf browser, while fossils of the same species from Ingleside, Texas are indicative of frugivory alongside folivory.

=== Group composition ===
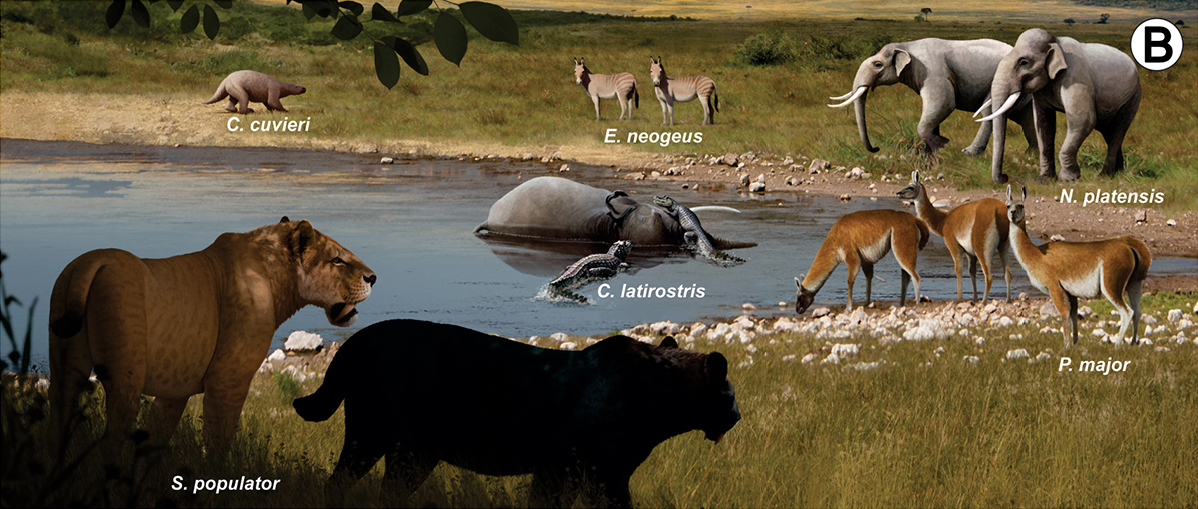
Two Smilodon populator stalking a Palaeolama major group in Brazil

As inferred from observations of modern llama, Palaeolama probably organized into bands (consisting of a single male and multiple females) and troops (consisting exclusively of young males sometimes described as "bachelors"). Typically, band territories are defended by resident males, while troops remain more or less free-roaming until they form bands of their own.

== Habitat ==
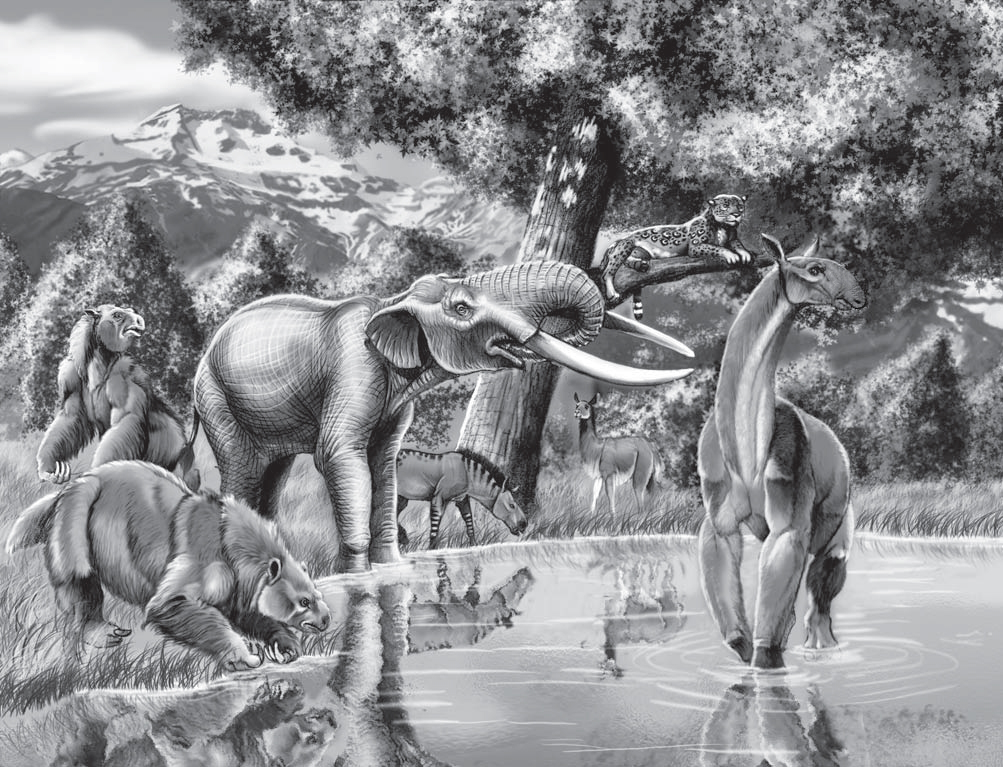
Restoration of Palaeolama (below the gomphothere's tusks) and other mammals of Late Pleistocene Chile

Fossil evidence suggests Palaeolama was primarily adapted to low-temperate, arid climates and preferred open, forested, and high-altitude mountainous regions. The distribution of fossil evidence suggests that they had an altitudinal range limited exclusively by their dietary (vegetation) requirements. Population density is shown to be highly dependent upon access and availability of subsistence resources.

== Range ==
The origins of this genus are a topic of much debate, as some of the earliest fossils occur during both the Irvingtonian in Florida and the Ensenadan in Uruguay. Despite this, agreement exists amongst paleobiologists on the dispersal of Palaeolama during the Great American Biotic Interchange. Also, some evidence suggests a move to northern South America during the second of two Pleistocene Camilidae migration events. Fossil evidence ranges from the southern extent of North America (including California, Florida, and Mexico) south through Central America, and terminates in South America (Argentina and Uruguay).

Palaeolama mirifica, the "stout-legged llama", is known from southern California and the Southeastern U.S., with the highest concentration of fossil specimens found in Florida (specifically the counties of Alachua, Citrus, Hillsborough, Manatee, Polk, Brevard, Orange, Sumter, and Levy). Other fossil occurrences have been discovered in Mexico, Central America (El Salvador) and South America (Argentina, Bolivia, Brazil, Chile, Colombia, Ecuador, Paraguay, Peru, Venezuela and Uruguay).

Palaeolama major, identified by Liais in 1872, lived during the Late Pleistocene and was identified in fossil assemblages from northeastern and northern Brazil, the Pampean region of Argentina and Uruguay, northern Venezuela, and the coastal regions of Ecuador and northern Peru.

Palaeolama weddelli, identified by Gervais in 1855, lived during the Mid- to Late Pleistocene, with fossil specimens found in southern Bolivia and the Andean region of Ecuador.

== Extinction ==
Climate change, changes and reductions in the types of vegetation on which they relied, and human predation are all hypothesized to have contributed to the extinction of Palaeolama during the Late Pleistocene or Early Holocene. Evidence from both the paleoecological and fossil records suggest that Palaeolama, among other extinct camelids, weathered a number of glacial and interglacial episodes throughout their existence in North and South America. Their disappearance in some regions has been shown to coincide with a change in climate (to warmer, humid conditions) occurring at the end of the Pleistocene (also known as the Late Quaternary warming) suggesting an inability to persevere. This hypothesis is further supported by paleoecological evidence suggesting post-megafaunal extinction shifts in vegetation and whole ecosystems.

== See also ==
- List of North American animals extinct in the Holocene
- List of South American animals extinct in the Holocene
