= Plionarctos =

Plionarctos Temporal range: 5.6–2.9 Ma Late Miocene - Late Pliocene

Scientific classification
- Kingdom: Animalia
- Phylum: Chordata
- Class: Mammalia
- Infraclass: Placentalia
- Order: Carnivora
- Family: Ursidae
- Subfamily: Tremarctinae
- Genus: †Plionarctos; Frick, 1926

Type species
- †Plionarctos edensis Frick, 1926

Species
- †P. edensis Frick, 1926 †P. harroldorum Tedford & Martin, 2001

Extinct genus of bears

Plionarctos is an extinct genus of short-faced bear endemic to North America from the Late Miocene to the Pliocene.

== Taxonomy ==
Described by Childs Frick in 1926, Plionarctos is the oldest known genus within the subfamily of the short-faced bears (Tremarctinae), and is believed to be ancestral to Arctodus, Arctotherium and Tremarctos. Once suggested to have emerged from the Ailuropodinae bears (Agriotherium and Indarctos), Plionarctos probably evolved from Ursavus which emigrated into North America from Eurasia during the Miocene, or possibly Protarctos. A new species, Plionarctos harroldum, was described in 2001 from the White Bluffs Fauna in Washington from remains previously attributed to Protarctos abstrusus. Middle Pleistocene species from France were described (Plionarctos stehlini and Plionarctos telonensis) but have since been reassigned & synonymized with the Asian black bear (Ursus thibetanus).

=== Diagnostics ===
==== Tremarctinae ====
Various dental characteristics link Plionarctos with other tremarctine bears, such as a deep mandible underneath the molars, a notable groove underneath the premolars, a masseteric fossa at its deepest in line with the teeth, an M1 molar with a labial enamel bulge and high talonid with a very shallow basin, and a rectangular M2 molar.

Archaic characteristics which separate Plionarctos from other tremarctines such as Arctodus and Tremarctos include a lack of a premasseteric fossa (and the associated extension of the strongly ridged masseteric crest) and a tri-rooted (rather than birooted) P4 premolar, with its protocone anterior (instead of behind) the carnassial notch.

==== Tremarctos ====
In addition to the lack of premasseteric fossa in Plionarctos, the M2 molar of Plionarctos is slightly shorter than that of Tremarctos (though tooth sizes are similar).

==== Plionarctos ====
Plionarctos harroldorum shares dental characteristics with Tremarctos, with both lacking a well-defined lingual cinguli, and a longer and wider talon on the M2, which is not as dorsal as Plionarctos edensis. The M2 of P. harroldorum is broad compared to the width of M1 with a longer talonid than in P. edensis.

== Evolution ==
Tremarctinae within Ursidae

- †Hemicyoninae
- - †Ursavinae
  - - Ailuropodinae
    - - Ursinae
      - - Tremarctinae (short-faced bears)
          - †Plionarctos
          - - †Arctodus
            - - Tremarctos
              - †Arctotherium

Likely part of the Hemphillian 2 migration wave (Hh2) across the Beringinian land bridge in the late early Miocene, the oldest confirmed record of Plionarctos is fossil material of P. edensis from the late Miocene (latest Hemphillian) Mt. Eden Formation in California dating to approximately 5.6 million years ago. A dentary of a purported 7-million-years-old member of the genus was reported from the Rattlesnake Formation in Oregon, but it was subsequently considered to be only identifiable as belonging to an indeterminate bear. The Hh2 migration was the largest migration wave of Carnivorans between Asia into North America, and was also one of the largest mammalian dispersal events of the Neogene. The ascendancy of Asian fauna in this exchange may have been due to the intensification of the monsoon season in northeastern Asia expanding humid forests into the Arctic (in contrast to the global trend of aridification and expansion of C4 grasslands), with the more static & arid ecologies of North America potentially acting as refugia for Asian fauna.

Due to the ecological diversity of the fauna, the Beringian corridor during the Hh2 migration event is believed to have been a mix of grasslands and forests. Bears were the largest faunal group, with over five species appearing in North America (representing almost all known genera of the period), with their omnivory, locomotive benefits due to large size and overall adaptability likely contributing to their success. Notable fauna within the Hh2 wave includes Plionarctos, Amphimachairodus, Enhydritherium, Indarctos, and Simocyon.

Plionarctos was the sole representative of the Tremarctinae subfamily of bears during its existence, with P. edensis being thought to be ancestral to P. harroldorum. Both Plionarctos edensis and Plionarctos harroldorum coexisted in the Late Hemphillian faunal stage of the Late Miocene, although only P. harroldorum is confirmed from the Blancan faunal stage.

Plionarctos is last recorded ca. 2.9Ma from Taunton, Washington, from a specimen which appears to be evolutionarily intermediate between Plionarctos harroldum and Tremarctos floridanus. Plionarctos was followed by three new genera of short-faced bear around the Plio-Pleistocene boundary. These were Arctodus (pristinus), Tremarctos (floridanus) and Arctotherium sp., which emerged in the Late Blancan age of North America circa 2.6Ma.

An investigation into the mitochondrial DNA of bear species indicates that the short-faced bears diverged from the Ursinae subfamily approximately 5.7 million years ago. Around the Miocene-Pliocene boundary (~5.3 Ma) short-faced bears, along with other ursids, experienced an explosive radiation in diversity, as C4 vegetation (grasses) and open habitats dominated, the world experienced a major temperature drop and increased seasonality, and a faunal turnover which extinguished 60–70% of all Eurasian faunal genera, and 70–80% of North American genera. Correspondingly, the three succeeding genera appear to genetically diverge around this time, with Arctodus splitting from Arctotherium and Tremarctos at between 5.5Ma and 4.8Ma, and Arctotherium and Tremarctos branching off at 4.1Ma.

== Description ==
Plionarctos is thought to have weighed around the size of a smaller spectacled bear (60–150 kg), and a skull length of 20 cm. Postcranial skeletons of Plionarctos are unknown. Like other tremarctine bears, Plionarctos is believed to have been sexually dimorphic. The Rattlesnake Formation specimen of P. edensis was calculated to 116 kg, while a P. harroldorum individual from Washington was calculated to 165.5 kg.

== Map of fossil localities ==
Interactive distribution map of Plionarctos (hover over dots for locality information)

Legend: P. edensis P. harrolodum

Plionarctos sp.

== Fossil distribution ==
Plionarctos existed between the middle Hemphillian faunal stage to the Blancan faunal stage (7Mya - 2.9Mya). Present on the coasts but rare in the Interior Plains, Plionarctos is thought to have preferred more humid forested habitats. The geologic range of Plionarctos (along with Teleoceras) correspond with the Late Miocene and Early Pliocene, which saw the expansion of C4 grasslands and was characterized by open prairie and North American faunas rich in horses, camels, and antilocaprids. The presence of Plionarctos and Teleoceras have been used to constrain the temporal ages of the Gray Fossil Site, Palmetto Fauna and the Pipe Creek Sinkhole to the Hemphillian (between 7Mya and 4.5Mya, late Miocene to early Pliocene), however specimens of these index fossils younger than 4.5Mya put this temporal bracketing in doubt.

=== Western Mountains ===
The type specimen of Plionarctos edensis was recovered from the Mt. Eden Formation of the Pacific Mountain System (Riverside County, California) and dates to the Hemphillian faunal stage (5.6Mya). Another individual (originally described as P. edensis) was also recovered from Riverside County (Aguanga Horizon, Blancan faunal stage).

=== Intermontane Plateaus ===
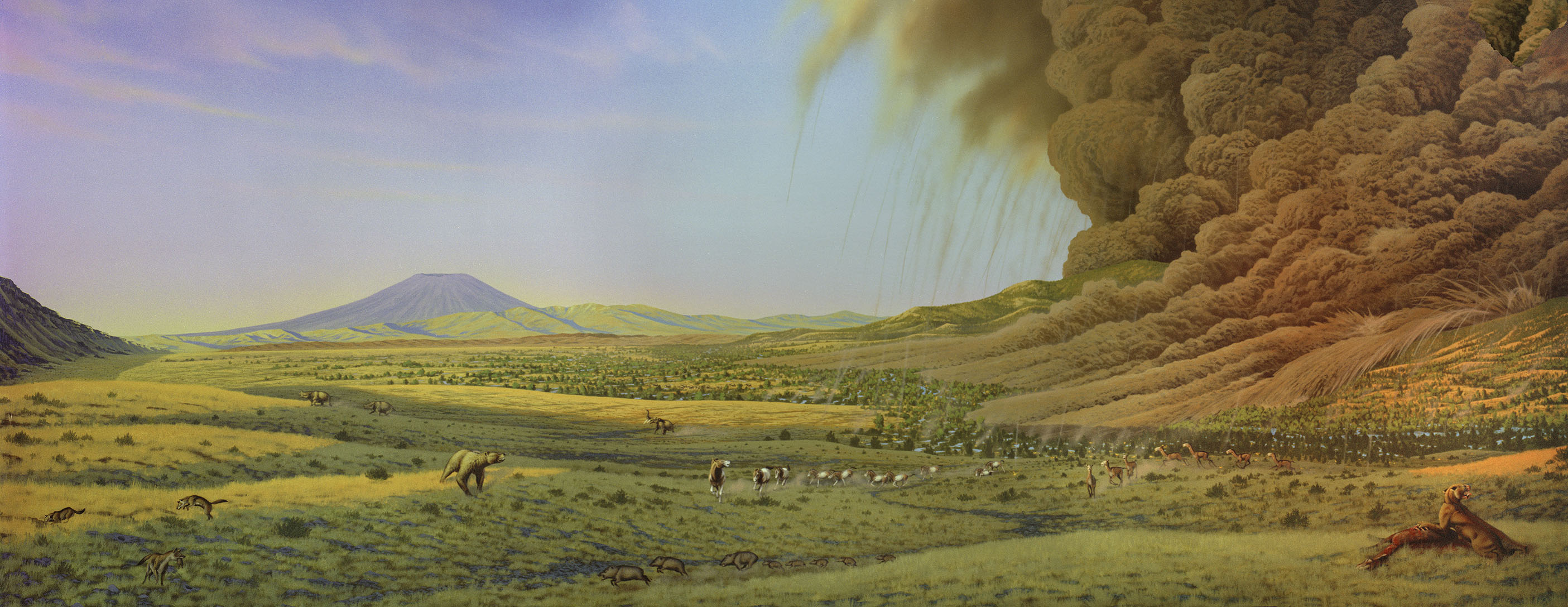
Reconstruction of the Rattlesnake Formation.

The oldest known specimen of Plionarctos (P. edensis) comes from the Rattlesnake Formation of the Intermontane Plateaus (Oregon, Hemphillian ca. 7Mya), alongside remains of Lutravus halli, "Hipparion sp.", and "Sphenophalos" sp. A sagebrush steppe with semi-arid wooded shrubland and tall grasslands, the Rattlesnake Formation fauna is considered a reference fauna for the Hemphillian faunal age. Being close to the Beringian land bridge, the Rattlesnake Formation preserves the earliest North American records of immigrant taxa from Asia, such as Plionarctos, Lutravus, Simocyon, and the fellow bear Indarctos. These fauna were recovered alongside Megalonyx, Amebelodon, Hemiauchenia, Megatylopus, Pliauchenia, Ilingoceras, Pediomeryx, Parablastomeryx, Mylohyus, Platygonus, Teleoceras, Hippotherium, Neohipparion, Pliohippus, Borophagus secundus, Borophagus pugnator, Eucyon, Metalopex, Vulpes, Lynx, Rhizosmilodon, and Nimravides. The presence of Castor californicus, Dipoides, Pekania, and an unidentified tapir suggest riparian forests also existed in this ecosystem. Plionarctos sp. has also been tentatively assigned to a toe bone recovered from Walnut Canyon, New Mexico (latest Hemphilian, late Miocene).

Conversely, the youngest representatives of Plionarctos have also been recovered from the Ringold Formation of Washington (White Bluffs & Taunton, Early & Late Blancan respectively). The White Bluffs specimen is the type specimen of P. harroldorum, while the Taunton individual is the youngest known P. harroldorum specimen, being dated to 2.9Mya. As the Taunton specimen is larger and has anatomical convergences with Tremarctos floridanus (having been initially identified as T. floridanus), the Taunton specimen may represent a transitional form between P. harroldorum and T. floridanus. The Taunton locality suggests that the Columbia Basin resembled the coastal Klamath Mountains of Oregon, which is dominated by conifers with a milder and moister climate (particularly the winters). Recovered from a freshwater fluvial environment, the Taunton P. harroldorum was preserved alongside numerous bony fish, turtles, waterfowl, Equus simplicidens and Capromeryx, along with Megalonyx, Platygonus, Camelops, Hemiauchenia, Dinofelis cf. paleonca, Borophagus, Canis lepophagus, Puma lacustris and cervids. An additional P. harroldorum has been recovered from Bear Springs, Arizona (Early Blancan Red Knolls Fauna, ca. 3.1Mya).

=== Interior Plains ===
The Pipe Creek Sinkhole of the Interior Plains (Indiana, 4-5Mya, latest Hemphillian or earliest Blancan) preserves a wetland environ which was surrounded by a dry, open herbaceous savanna with some denser vegetation (such as Fagus, Platanus, Populus and Salix), representing an extension of the Early Pliocene Great Plains. The site records abundant leopard frogs and pond turtles, but also Plionarctos edensis, Borophagus sp., Vulpes, Canis sp., Castor, Spermophilus, deer, Hemiauchenia, Aepycamelus, Titanotylopus and Teleoceras. The Hemphillian-age Ash Hollow Formation (Ogalla / Bear Tooth Slide, Nebraska) preserves Plionarctos sp. close to but distinguished from Plionarctos edensis.

=== Appalachian Highlands ===
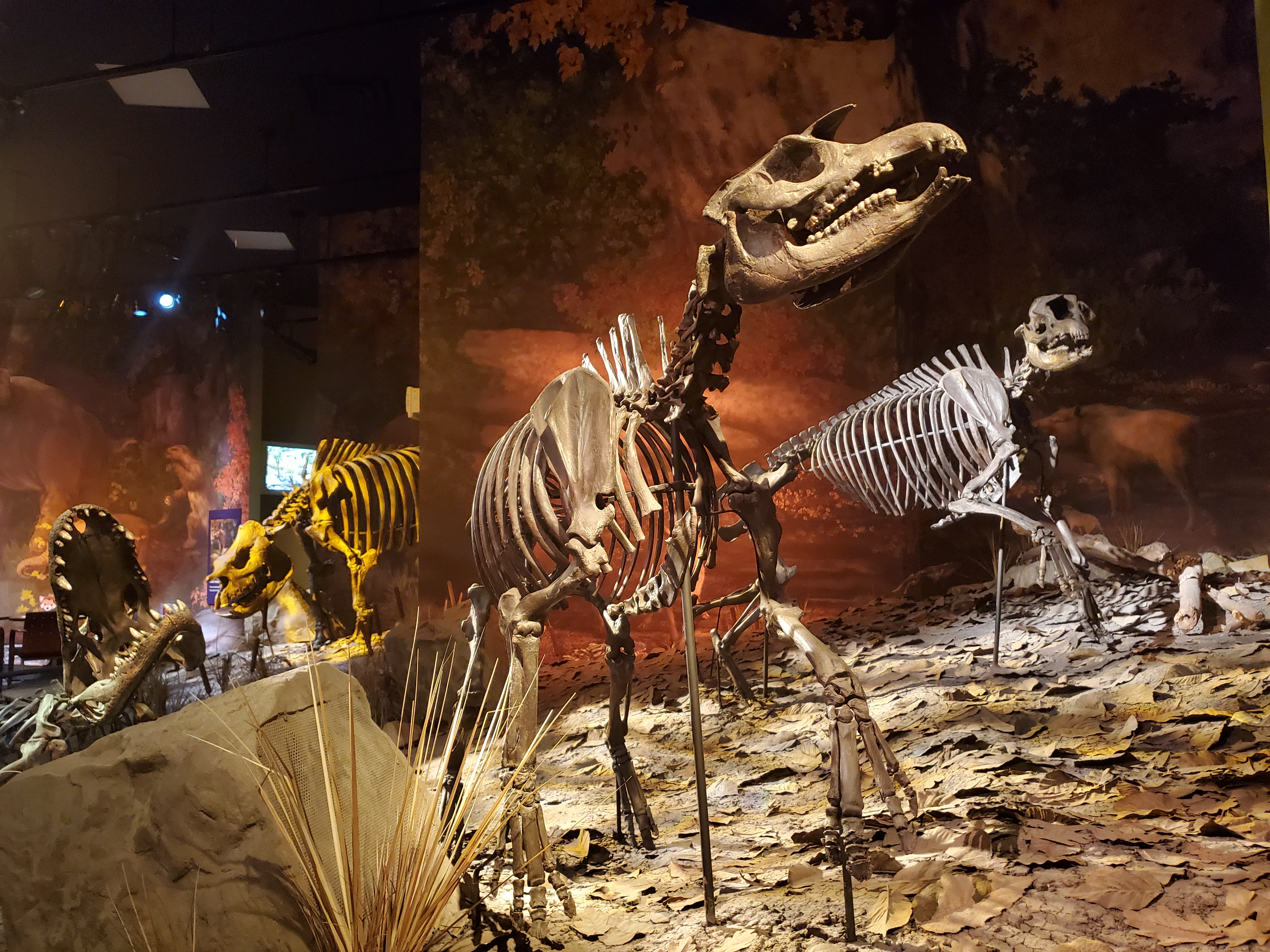
Gray Fossil Site & Museum.

The Gray Fossil Site (ca. 4.5 - 4.9 Mya, latest Hemphillian or earliest Blancan, Appalachian Highlands) of Tennessee was a lacustrine sinkhole situated in a dry & mesic oak-hickory woodland / savanna, which also included pine, walnut, and a herbaceous forb understory. Often associated with periodic fires, the herbaceous understory may also indicate a patchy canopy. Surrounded by expanding Miocene grasslands, the Gray Fossil Site acted as a refugium of dense vegetation for browsers and mixed feeders (though there was a noticeable lack of large mammalian predators). Plionarctos sp. was recovered alongside many aquatic animals such as alligators, salamanders, fish, turtles, beavers and tapirs, along with Mammut, Teleoceras, Megatylopus, Pristinailurus, Mylohyus, Prosthennops, Arctomeles, Gulo, Borophagus and saber-toothed cats. The Pipe Creek Sinkhole and Palmetto Fauna are the most biologically similar sites to the Gray Fossil Site.

=== Atlantic Plain ===
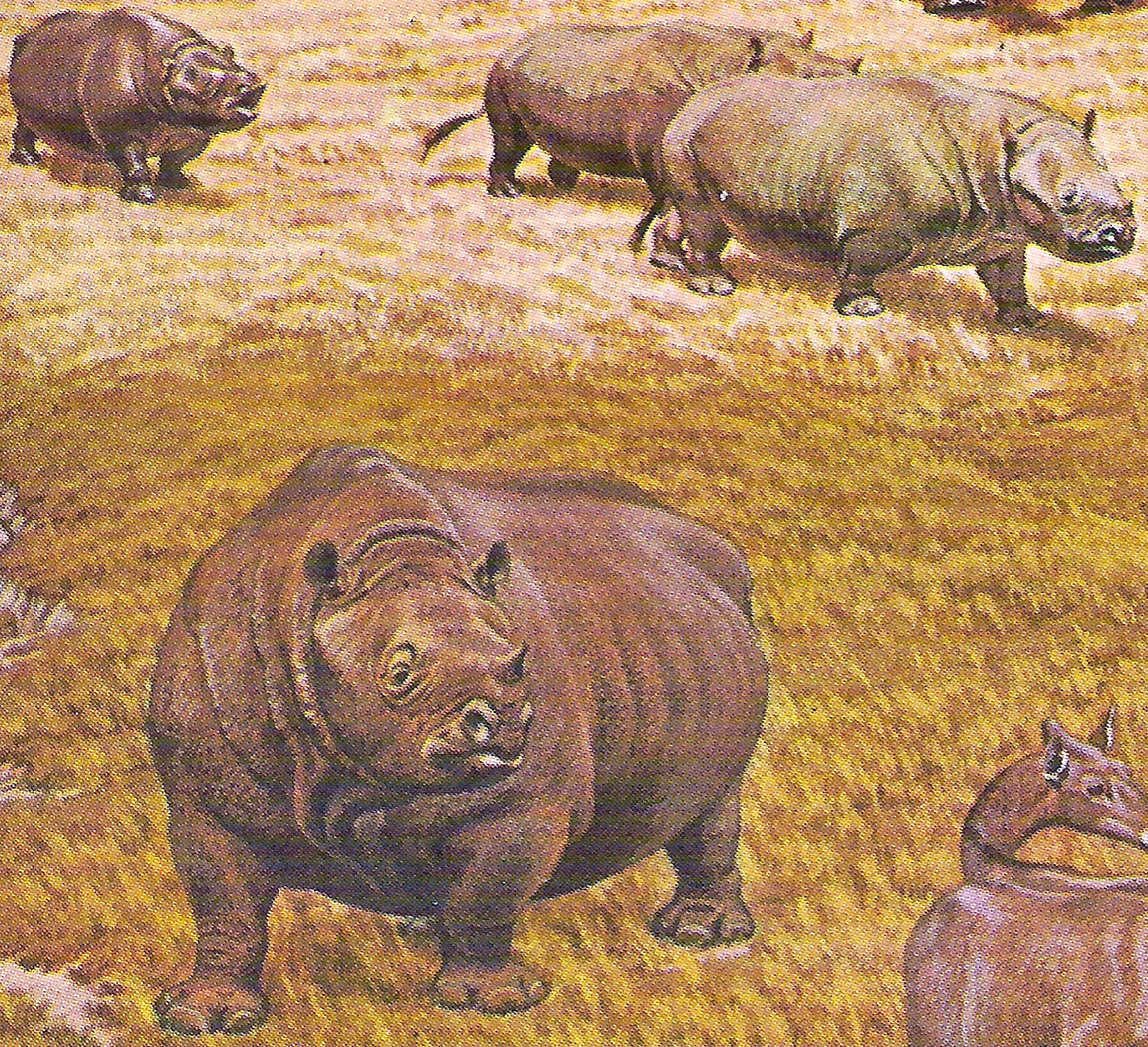
Teleoceras is often found in association with Plionarctos.

The Palmetto Fauna of the upper Bone Valley Formation (4.5 - 5Mya, Hemphillian faunal age, Florida) is the largest and best known late Hemphillian land vertebrate assemblage in the eastern United States. Dating to the early Pliocene of the Atlantic Plain, the Palmetto fauna resembled an archaic Clarendonian faunal assemblage from the Interior Plains (ca. 10Mya) due to its breadth & diversity of browsing, mixed-feeding, and grazing herbivores. 19 specimens of Plionarctos sp. have been recovered from the Fort Green, Palmetto, and Gardinier mines. Together with Agriotherium, bears make up 22% of carnivoran teeth & jaws in the Palmetto Fauna.

Floridan Plionarctos sp. has been distinguished from P. edensis but is currently unassigned. Additional fauna includes Hesperotestudo, Amphimachairodus, Rhizosmilodon, Lynx, Vulpes, Borophagus hilli, Borophagus pugnator, Carpocyon, Eucyon, Arctonasua, Enhydritherium, Megalonyx, Rhynchotherium, Gomphotherium, Mammut, Aphelops, Teleoceras, Astrohippus, Cormohipparion, Dinohippus, Nannippus, Neohipparion, Pseudhipparion, Hexameryx, Kyptoceras, Catagonus, Mylohyus, Tapirus polkensis, Antilocapra, Hemiauchenia, and Megatylopus, along with one of the oldest species of deer (Eocoileus) in North America. Although half the species recovered also occurred in late Hemphillian faunas of the western United States and Mexico (Mount Eden, California; Santee, Nebraska; Buis Ranch, Oklahoma; Yepómera, Chihuahua; El Ocoté, Guanajuato), the more humid & forested site also preserves many endemic southeastern species (particularly ungulates), along with marine fauna such as sharks, rays, and cetaceans. Due to higher sea levels, the Florida Peninsula was only about 5% of its present land area. Plionarctos sp. has also been recovered from Montbrook Site (Plionarctos sp., 5 - 5.5 Mya, Florida).
