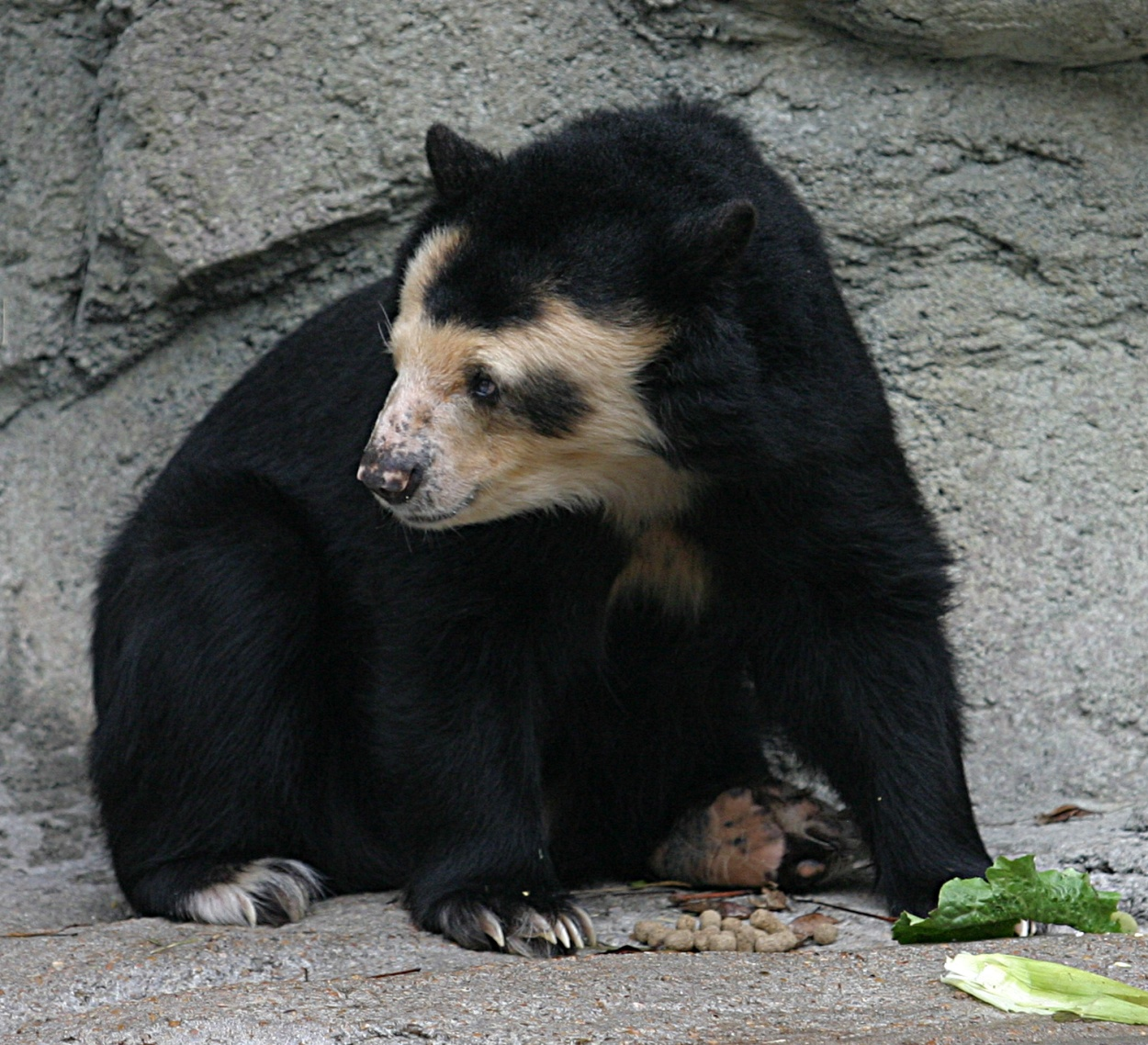
- Spectacled bear, Tremarctos ornatus

Scientific classification
- Kingdom: Animalia
- Phylum: Chordata
- Class: Mammalia
- Order: Carnivora
- Family: Ursidae
- Subfamily: Tremarctinae
- Genus: Tremarctos; Gervais, 1855

Type species
- Tremarctos ornatus Cuvier, 1825

Species
- †Tremarctos floridanus (Gildey, 1928); Tremarctos ornatus (Cuvier, 1825)

= Tremarctos =

Tremarctos Temporal range: 2.7–0 Ma Late Pliocene - Holocene

Genus of bears

Tremarctos is a genus of the monophyletic bear subfamily Tremarctinae, endemic to Americas from the Pliocene to recent. The northern species, the Florida short-faced bear (T. floridanus), went extinct in the Late Pleistocene. The sole living Tremarctos species is the South American spectacled bear (T. ornatus). Tremarctos is also the only living genus under the Tremarctinae subfamily, with the other short-faced bears (Plionarctos, Arctodus, and Arctotherium) all being extinct.

== Taxonomy ==
The genus name Tremarctos was created in 1855 by Alfred Gervais. While his suggestion for making Tremarctos a separate genus was rejected, after further studies comparing skeletal structures of the teeth and jaws of Tremarctos to other bear species his suggestion was later accepted.

The word Tremarctos is derived from the Greek language and translates to "hole bear" in English, due to the entepicondylar foramen on the humerus. However, the name "hole bear" could also come from the fact that the tan facial markings appear on the face except around the bear's eyes, making it look like the bear has holes for eyes, giving it the name Jukumari in Andean languages.

=== Diagnostics ===
==== Within Ursidae ====
Unlike almost all other extant bears (from the Ursinae subfamily), tremarctine bears like Tremarctos appear to have a disproportionately shorter snouts, giving them the name "short-faced." This apparent shortness is an illusion caused by the deep snouts and short nasal bones of tremarctine bears compared with ursine bears; Tremarctinae had shorter and taller skulls, but not a shorter face than most living bears.

In addition to being brachycephalic, tremarctine bears' skulls possessed well developed zygomatic arches and glenoid mandibular fossas, a premasseteric fossa on the mandible (except for Plionarctos), with tremarctine bears often possessing an entepicondylar foramen on the humerus. Moreover, tremarctine bears' orbits are also bigger, more rounded and lateralized. Unlike tremarctine bears, ursine bears have only one masseteric fossa on their mandible and more slender and elongated skulls, with generally narrower molars (with the exception of polar bears). Cranial differences between tremarctine and ursine bears also include an extra lateral cusp between the trigonid and talonid on the m1 molar, with tremarctines possessing larger molars in comparison with ursines.

Within the Tremarctinae subfamily, Tremarctos is noteworthy for its relatively smaller teeth, the presence of anterior premolars, well-defined masseteric fossae, and a W-shaped cusp pattern on the lower m1 molar.

==== Tremarctos ====
T. floridanus and T. ornatus are morphologically very similar, and are considered sister species. However, T. floridanus was around twice as big as T. ornatus, being around the size of a larger American black bear. Though both species have short rostrums in comparison with ursine bears, the rostrum of T. floridanus is relatively narrow compared with T. ornatus. Additionally, unlike T. ornatus, T. floridanus possesses a signature "glabella" (dome-like protrusion) on the frontal bone of the cranium. Both species share practically identical dentitions (particularly behind the canines), though the dentition of T. floridanus was larger, often with a reduced number of premolars and relatively longer molars. Tremarctos floridanus has mandibular condyles raised well above the plane of the teeth, while T. ornatus does not, suggesting T. ornatus potentially possesses a larger gape. The lower jaws of T. floridanus are larger; while the ramus of the mandible is taller in T. floridanus, the relative height of the mandible's coronoid process is the same in both species.

Both species also differ slightly in their post-cranial proportions. T. floridanus has been described as a relatively long-limbed species compared to T. ornatus, with the humerus, femur and neck being notably longer compared to body length. While the forelimbs of T. ornatus are longer than their hindlimbs (likely due to arboreal activity), the hindlimbs of T. floridanus are the same length as their forelimbs. Additionally, T. floridanus has also been described as possessing much more robust limb bones. However, the paws of T. floridanus are proportionally shorter and smaller than T. ornatus. Kurtén compared the differences between the Tremarctos species as the differences between brown bears and Eurasian cave bears.

== Evolution ==
Tremarctinae within Ursidae

- †Hemicyoninae
- - †Ursavinae
  - - Ailuropodinae
    - - Ursinae
      - - Tremarctinae (short-faced bears)
          - †Plionarctos
          - - †Arctodus
            - - Tremarctos
              - †Arctotherium

Tremarctos belongs to the subfamily Tremarctinae, which first appeared as Plionarctos during the late Miocene epoch of North America. Plionarctos is also believed to be the ancestor of all subsequent Tremarctine bears (Arctodus, Arctotherium and Tremarctos). The genetic divergence date for Arctodus is between 5.5 million years ago and 4.8 million years ago, and between Arctotherium and Tremarctos at 4.1 million years ago. This genetic divergence occurred around the Miocene-Pliocene boundary, when tremarctine bears, along with other ursids, experienced an explosive radiation in diversity, as C_{4} vegetation (grasses) and open habitats dominated. The world experienced a major temperature drop and increased seasonality, and a faunal turnover which extinguished 70–80% of North American genera.

The medium-sized Arctodus pristinus, Tremarctos floridanus and Arctotherium sp. evolved from Plionarctos in the Blancan faunal age of North America, being first recorded ca. 2.6Ma. Researchers believe that Arctotherium was a sister lineage to Tremarctos, or even emerged from the Tremarctos genus. These first appearances near the Plio-Pleistocene boundary coincide with the start of the Quaternary Glaciation, the formation of the Panama Land Bridge, and the second phase of the Great American Biotic Interchange, with the first records of the main South American faunal wave into the United States. A Plionarctos harroldum specimen from Taunton (Washington, 2.9Ma) appears evolutionarily intermediate between Plionarctos harroldum and Tremarctos floridanus, affirming that Plionarctos harroldum is the likely ancestor of Tremarctos. In comparison with Plionarctos harroldum and other tremarctine bears, preliminary research examining the sizes of m1 molar suggest that the Tremarctos genus saw a notable enlargement of their carnassial teeth.

Genetic research on the mitochondrial DNA of tremarctine bears indicates Tremarctos was more closely related to Arctotherium than Arctodus. However, a preliminary investigation of tremarctine bear's nuclear DNA suggests an extensive history of hybridization between Tremarctos and Arctodus in North America, although hybridization with Arctotherium (likely A. wingei) as the Tremarctos genus migrated southwards into South America is also possible. Evidence of gene flow between Tremarctos and an ursine bear was also uncovered, most likely due to the extensive overlap between Tremarctos and the ancestors of the American black bear in Pleistocene North America.

=== Tremarctos genus ===
The Intermontane Plateaus of North America preserve the oldest possible remains of Tremarctos (T. floridanus), being from Palm Spring Formation (Anza-Borrego, California, ~2.7Ma), Grand View fauna (Glenns Ferry Formation, Idaho, 2.3Ma), and San Simon (Arizona ca. 2.2Ma), although the Grand View specimen may instead represent Plionarctos. Additionally, though originally described as Arctodus sp., researchers suggest that indeterminate ursid from the mid-Blancan Buckhorn fauna (New Mexico, 4Ma - 3Ma) may represent either Tremarctos sp. or Protarctos abtrusus.

The North American species T. floridanus is believed to have been the ancestor of T. ornatus. However, the fossil record of T. ornatus is unknown, as T. ornatus remains do not appear until the Holocene of South America. This suggests that the extant T. ornatus descends from an independent, later dispersal event from North America to that of Arctotherium, possibly after Arctotherium wingei became extinct in the Americas. Current scholarly analysis asserts that A. wingei may have restricted the range of the T. floridanus outside of Central & South America until the extinction of A. wingei, where subsequently Tremarctos begins to be found in the South America. Genetic research suggests a possible history of hybridization between Tremarctos and Arctotherium (likely A. wingei) either in Central America throughout the Pleistocene or as the Tremarctos genus migrated into South America at the end of the Pleistocene.

However, as the montane niche (highland forests between 1,800m and 3100m) was otherwise open in South America, T. ornatus may have been present in the Pleistocene South America (as Arctotherium preferred lowlands). Since both A. wingei and A. tarijense have been recovered from a maximum altitude of 1860m (Tarija, Bolivia), their ranges would have had minimal overlap.

The last reliable direct radiocarbon date for T. floridanus is 23,230 ± 490 BP, from Laubach Cave No. III, Texas, although the chronology of megafaunal extinctions in the Late Pleistocene of southeastern North America (the native range of Tremarctos floridanus) has been disputed. Statistical analyses suggest that a later survival (until the end of the Rancholabrean epoch ca. 11,700 BP) in the Atlantic Plains of the United States is possible, based on sampling biases associated with uncommon fauna, and a lack of reliable dates from the humid Atlantic plain due to poor preservation.

While T. floridanus may have disappeared in North America, the species may have evolved into T. ornatus in South America, either in the Pleistocene or the Holocene. Molecular evidence from Colombian, Ecuadorian and Venezuelan T. ornatus specimens suggests a population divergence occurred between 15,000 and 25,000 thousand years ago. The earliest known remains of the spectacled bear are from a male from Chaquil Cave, north central Peru, and have been dated to 6,790 years ago (5,980 radiocarbon years). Further finds are from archeological sites in Colombia (dated to 4,030 BP & 2,725 BP respectively) and an archeological site in Peru dated to 1,500 BP.

== Description ==
=== Size ===
Species under the Tremarctos genus are about average-sized bears, similar in size to the American black bear. They can weigh anywhere from 150 to 400 lbs. T. floridanus however, was bigger than T. ornatus. Both species are sexually dimorphic, with T. floridanus males being ~25% larger than the females. This also results in the males having protein blood levels higher than the females' levels. Unlike most bears, the forelimbs are either longer than its hindlimbs (T. ornatus), or of equal length (T. floridanus).

=== Morphology ===
Tremarctos has long curved claws and plantigrade feet. Additionally, Tremarctos possesses proportionally shorter feet than its Tremarctine relatives (e.g. Arctodus). As for their fur, they are usually black with a tannish marking that extends from their chest to around their face. While Tremarctos floridanus's exact appearance is unknown, they presumably resembled the Tremarctos ornatus. Although they have large, deep skulls, they are the smallest in length among the bear species. The premassateric fossa has been used to detect maturity in tremarctine bears, with only T. ornatus adults possessing fully developed fossa. The canalis semicircularis lateral suggests that T. floridanus had a head posture of 38°, which is more oblique than its sister species T. ornatus (29°); as T. ornatus inhabits densely vegetated areas, the more oblique head posture in T. floridanus could infer a greater capacity for long distance vision.

==== Dentition ====
The species under the Tremarctos genus have short mandibles as well as short crania. Even though they are omnivores, the evidence of having short mandibles and crania indicates they feed mostly on plants and fruits and only sometimes eat meat. Because of this they also have resilient teeth near their cheeks. They also have small canines and large molars showing they eat meat as well. They have 42 teeth.

== Habitat ==
Unlike its modern Neotropical sister species T. ornatus, T. floridanus was a temperate species that has almost entirely been recovered from Nearctic sites (southern North America). T. ornatus however lives in South America, in the highlands associated with the Andes Mountains of Bolivia, Colombia, Peru and Venezuela. Tremarctos orantus is the only species of bear to live in South America. They like to build nests that they use to sleep and eat in, in trees of highland humid tropical rain forests. They are also able to live in other types of biomes such as temperate grasslands and deciduous forests.

== Diet ==
The diet of Tremarctos bears is varied. They are considered omnivores as they eat fruit, corn, plants, insects, farm animals, and more. However, the extreme wear of the teeth in the earliest known remains of T. ornatus (6,790 BP) suggests a primarily carnivorous diet for that male individual.

Species under this genus are able to use their paws to manipulate food. They can strip leaves off of trees, pick apart fruits, grasp food, etc. They do this with the help of having a radius sesamoid, also referred to as a "false thumb".

Hunting and eating take up most of a Tremarctos bears activity levels. Tremarctos bears are diturnal meaning that they will hunt during either the day, evening, or night, meaning they do not hibernate. It depends on where the bear is located and what the current season is that determines when they are the most active.

== Breeding ==
Courtship occurs between male and female T. ornatus and this usually involves vocalizations or playful fighting. T. ornatus are polygamous, with male bears breeding with multiple female bears. They are also polyesterous, meaning the bears have specific breeding seasons with twins being the most common litter. Cubs are usually born during seasons when fruits and vegetation are growing and becoming ripe.

The mothering bears create dens for raising their offspring. When the cubs are born, their eyes are closed and they lack teeth. The mothers will care for the cubs for about three years and after which, they separate. Male T. ornatus tend to live longer than females.

== Threats ==
While the T. ornatus is higher up on the food chain, there are a couple of predators and other things that threaten them. With Tremarctos floridanus extinct, Tremarctos ornatus is the only living species of this genus, their population is slowly declining and they are considered vulnerable on the Threatened Species List. One of the biggest reasons for their decline is due to humans poaching and causing their habitat loss. In some locations they encounter predators such as jaguars and cougars. They are also susceptible to parasites such as ticks and nematodes as well as diseases such as alopecia and neoplasia.
