= Rattlesnake Formation =

Geologic formation in Oregon, United States

- Stratigraphic range: Miocene-Late Pliocene
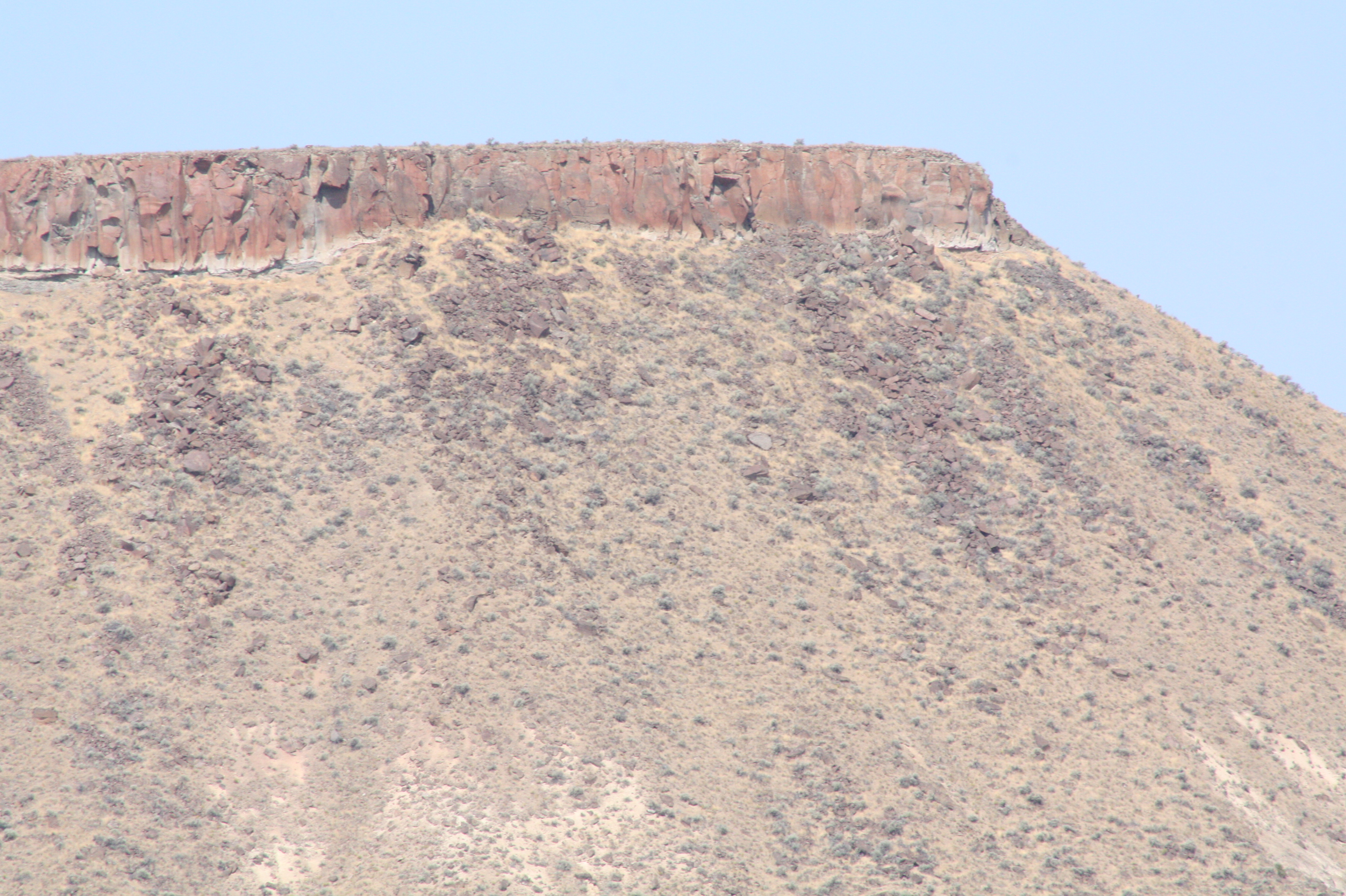
- The caprock in this photo (near Picture Gorge) is the ignimbrite layer
- Type: Sedimentary and igneous
- Overlies: Mascall Formation, Columbia River Basalt Group
- Area: John Day Valley
- Thickness: 700 feet (210 m)

Lithology
- Primary: Fanglomerate, siltstone
- Other: Tuff (ignimbrite)

Location
- Coordinates: 44.5°N 119.6°W
- Approximate paleocoordinates: 44.5°N 116.9°W
- Region: Oregon
- Country: United States
- Extent: eastern Oregon

Type section
- Named for: Rattlesnake Creek
- Named by: J. C. Merriam
- Year defined: 1901
- Rattlesnake Formation (the United States) Rattlesnake Formation (Oregon)

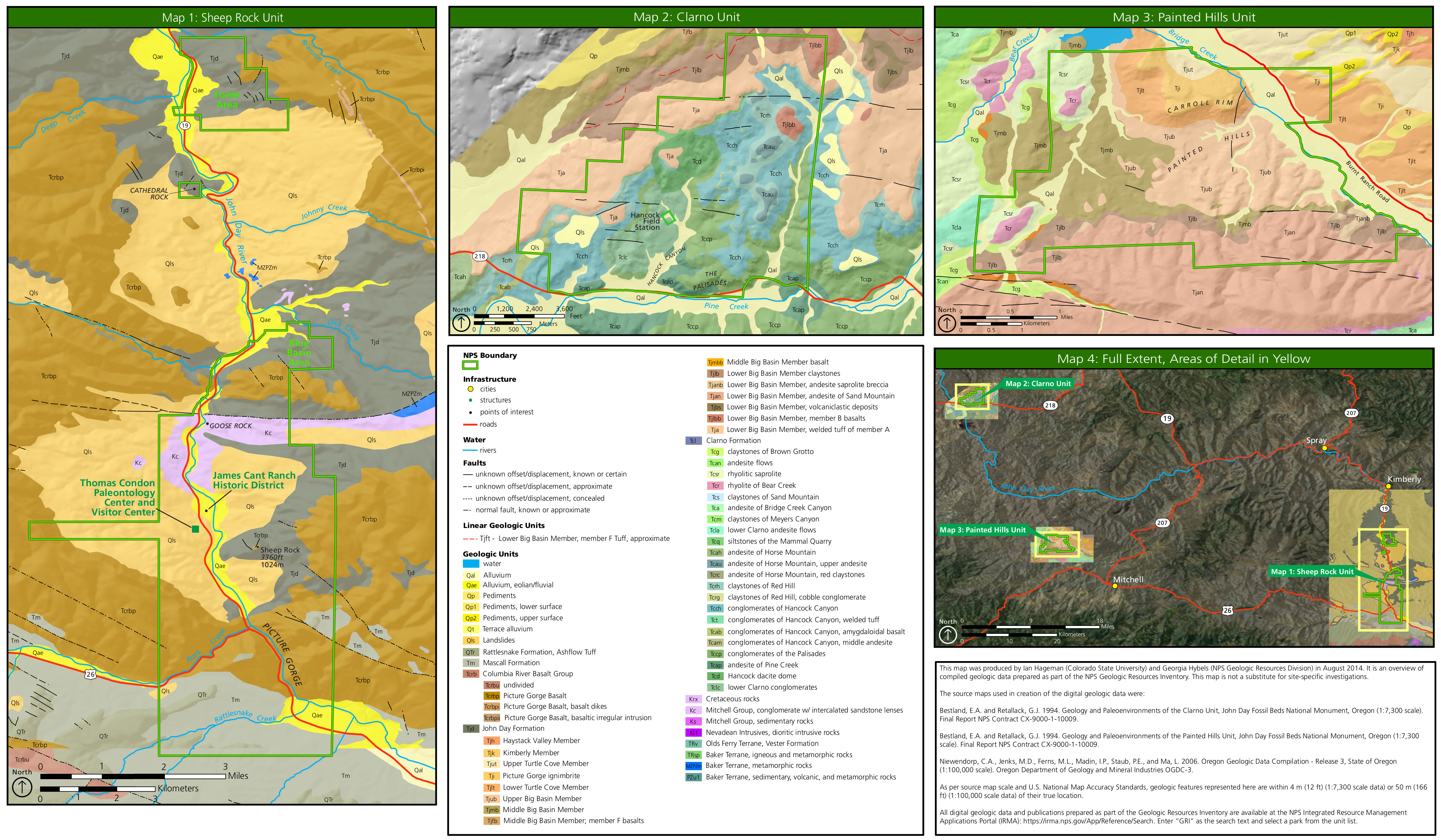
John Day Fossil Beds map

The Rattlesnake Formation is a Miocene to late Pliocene geologic formation found along the John Day River Valley of Oregon, in the Western United States.

== Description ==
The formation is described in Geologic Formations of Eastern Oregon (1972) as follows:

The unit is composed of up to 700 feet of fanglomerate and finer terrestrial sediments and a 40-foot thick ignimbrite unit which crops out in the middle of the section. The gravel is well rounded and consists of pebbles of basalt, chert, siltstone, diorite, rhyolite, and chert set in a medium-grained matrix of poorly indurated volcanic sandstone. The ignimbrite displays zonation typical of welded ashflow tuffs and is a prominent ridge former.

== Age ==
The ignimbrite was radiometrically dated by the Potassium–argon method at 6.4 million years by Evernden and James (1964).

== Fossil content ==
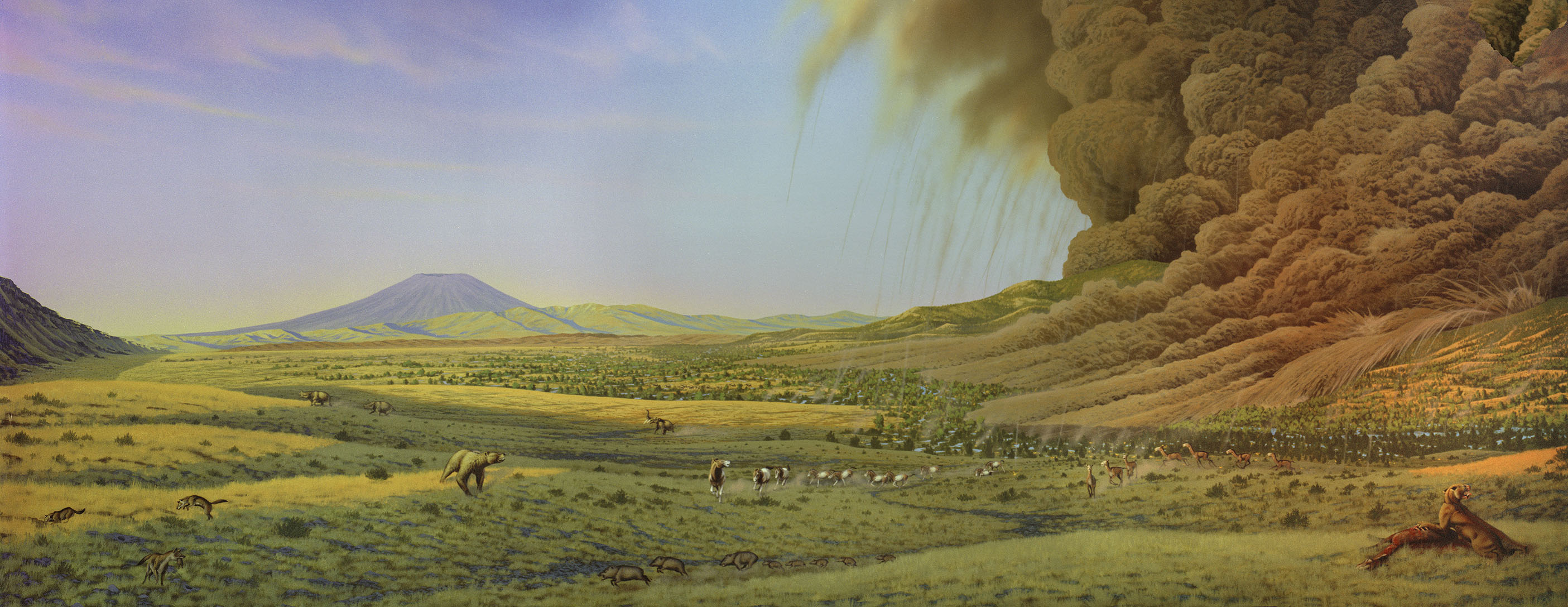
Restoration of the animals of the Rattlesnake Formation

Middle and late Pliocene mammals have been recovered from beneath the ignimbrite. Fossils found here include Amebelodon sp., the extinct peccary Mylohyus longirostris, the extinct North American rhino Teleoceras fossiger, Indarctos oregonensis, Pliohippus spectans, Machairodus sp., Hemiauchenia vera, an extinct species of fox known as Vulpes stenognathus and the earliest record of modern-day beavers.

In the lower fanglomerate member of the Rattlesnake Formation, remains of Pekania occulta were found.
