= The Badlands (California) =

Mountain range in San Bernardino and Riverside Counties, California, United States

- San Timoteo Badlands
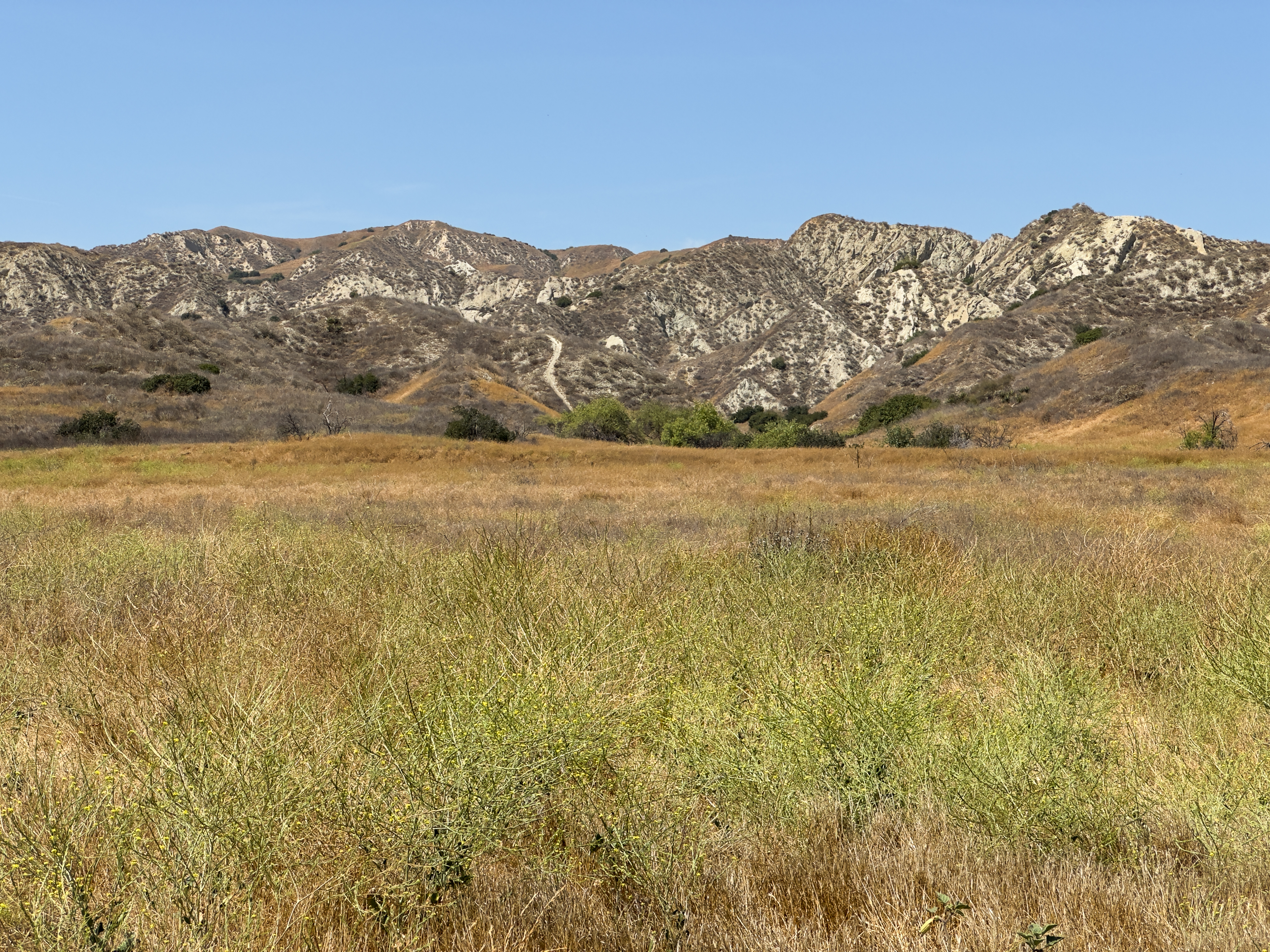
- San Timoteo Badlands near Moreno Valley, California

Highest point
- Elevation: 692 ft (211 m)

Geography
- Location within California
- Country: United States
- State: California
- County: Riverside County, San Bernardino County
- Range coordinates: 33°57′15.059″N 117°6′48.119″W
- Topo map: USGS El Casco

The Badlands are a mountain range in San Bernardino County and Riverside County, California. They are also known as the San Timoteo Badlands. The range trend northwest–southeast with the San Jacinto Valley to the southwest, the San Timoteo Canyon to the northeast and the San Jacinto Mountains to the east. These mountains separate the cities of Beaumont and Moreno Valley. The mountains are crossed by California State Route 60, California State Route 79, and a handful of smaller roads.

== Fossil excavations ==
The San Timoteo Badlands were excavated under by a team sponsored by Childs Frick from 1916 to 1921. Comprising both the Mt. Eden Formation and the San Timoteo Formation, fossils from the Late Miocene, Pliocene and early Pleistocene have been recovered from several sites across the Badlands.
