= Pipe Creek Sinkhole =

Paleontological site in Grant County, Indiana

Coordinates: 40°27′39″N 85°47′41″W

The Pipe Creek Sinkhole near Swayzee in Grant County, Indiana, is one of the most important paleontological sites in the interior of the eastern half of North America. It is preserved because it was buried by glacial till. Uncovered in 1996 by workers at the Pipe Creek Junior limestone quarry, the sinkhole has yielded a diverse array of fossils from the Pliocene epoch, dating back five million years. Discoveries have been made there of the remains of camelids, bears, beavers, frogs, snakes, turtles, and several previously unknown species of rodents. Two fish taxa, bullhead (Ameiurus) and sunfish (Centrarchidae), have also been found there.

== Origin and importance ==
The Pipe Creek Sinkhole preserves an ancient wetland. It was created by the collapse of a limestone cave in a Silurian reef formation. That left a steep-sided depression about 75 meters (246 ft) long, 50 meters (164 ft) wide and 11 meters (36 ft) deep. When water collected in the depression, it became the habitat of the plants and animals whose remains were preserved there when the sinkhole was buried by glacial outwash and till during the Pleistocene Epoch, two million to 11,000 years ago.

While the ecology of the Pliocene in North America is well known from fossil discoveries in other places, notably coastal sites, the Pleistocene glaciers destroyed or scattered most of the fossil remains in the continent's interior. The Pipe Creek Sinkhole, however, was buried by the glaciers and the debris they left, making it the only known Pliocene example in the central part of the eastern half of the continent.

== The sinkhole's ecology ==
The ancient wetland was home to a large and dense plant and animal population that includes both extinct and extant forms. The climate was warm and temperate, but somewhat dry, possibly supporting a grassland-forest transitional zone. The preserved vertebrate fauna are dominated by aquatic species, particularly leopard frogs, which are still common throughout the United States. Mammalian finds include an early rhinoceros (Teleoceras, possibly from the Miocene epoch), canids, peccaries and short-faced bear.

Backed by a grant from the National Science Foundation, researchers from the Indiana State Museum and several universities substantially completed field work at the sinkhole in the summer of 2004, but there was about one weeklong dig a year from 2005 to 2011. What probably was the last work at the site took place in 2014, with scientists and volunteers screening soil previously removed from the sinkhole.

== See also ==
- Ashfall Fossil Beds
- Gray Fossil Site
- List of fossil sites (with link directory)
- List of sinkholes of the United States
