= San Timoteo Formation =

Geologic formation in California, United States

- Type: Formation

Location
- Region: California
- Country: United States

The San Timoteo Formation, also called the San Timoteo Beds, is a geologic formation in California.

== History ==
Part of the wider San Timoteo Badlands, San Timoteo Formation was initially excavated in San Timoteo Canyon under by a team sponsored by Childs Frick from 1916 to 1921.

== Geology ==
The San Timoteo Formation represents Pliocene and Early Pleistocene sediments, mostly sandstone. The Formation overlies the late Miocene and early Pliocene Mt. Eden Formation (Jack Rabbit Trail & Eden Hot Springs localities, corresponding to the Hemphillian and Blancan faunal stages).

== Fossils ==
Fossils of Irvingtonian prehistoric mammals were found in the San Timoteo Formation (El Casco, Mammoth and Shutt Ranch localities). These include:

- Canis edwardii (Edward's wolf)
- Microtus sp. (vole)
- Ondatra idahoensis (muskrat)
- Mictomys kansasensis (bog lemming)
- Erethizon cascoensis (porcupine)
- “Plesippus” fracescana (three-toed horse)
- Equus bautistensis (horse)
- Tapirus merriami (tapir)
- Odocoileus cascaensis (deer)
- Megalonyx sp. (ground sloth)
- Mammuthus sp. (mammoth)
- Possibly a giant bear (may be either Arctodus or Agriotherium)

Fossils have also been recovered from the El Casco Substation locality, which was dated to 1.4Mya. Recovered specimens include Smilodon gracilis, Homotherium, two ground sloths, two types of camels, a llama, horse, and deer. Plant fossils include birch, pine, sycamore and oak trees.

== See also ==
- List of fossiliferous stratigraphic units in California
- Paleontology in California
