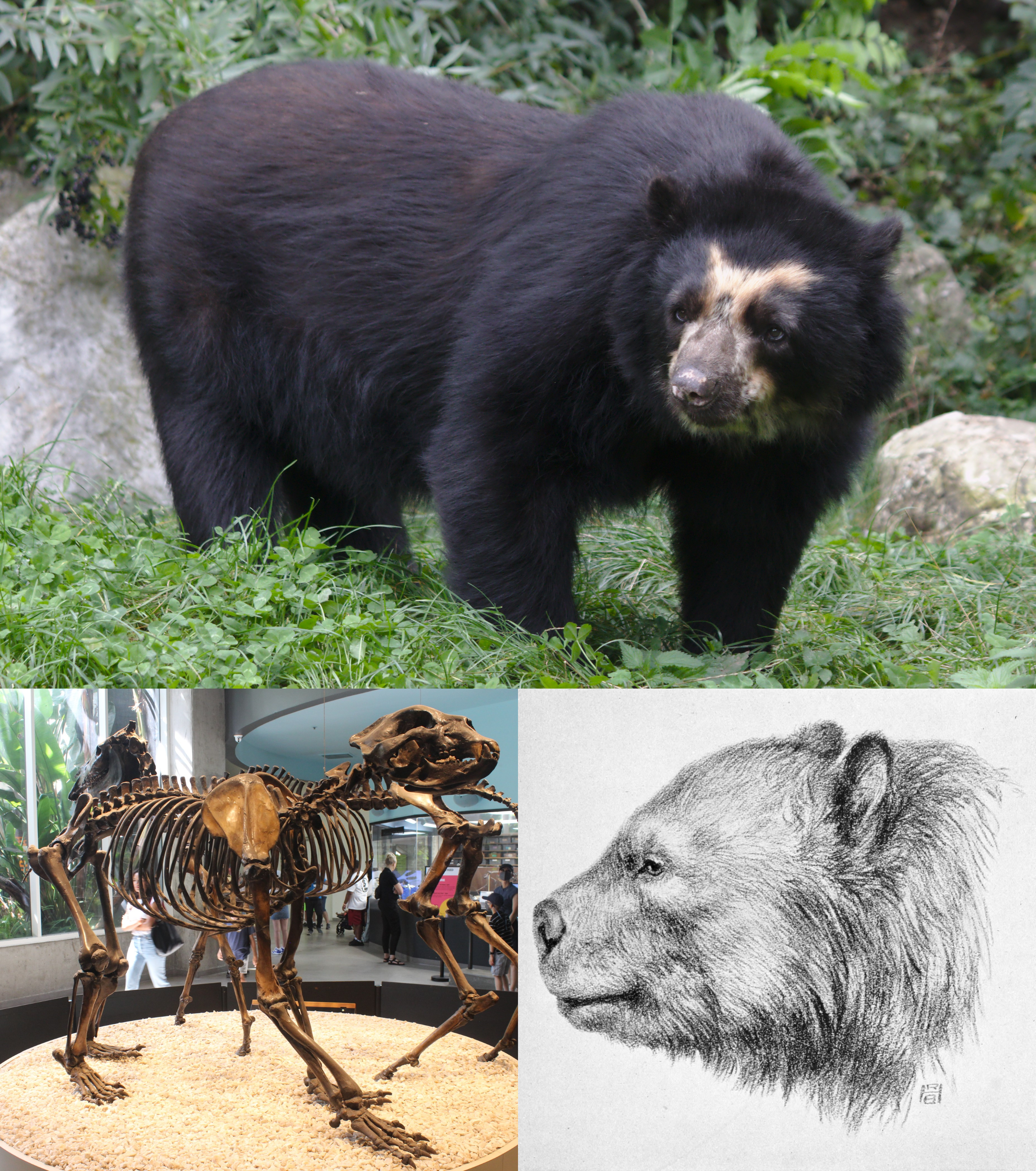
- Spectacled bear, Arctodus simus and Arctotherium bonariense

Scientific classification
- Kingdom: Animalia
- Phylum: Chordata
- Class: Mammalia
- Order: Carnivora
- Family: Ursidae
- Subfamily: Tremarctinae; Merriam & Stock, 1925

Type genus
- Tremarctos Gervais, 1855

Genera
- †Arctodus †Arctotherium †Plionarctos; Tremarctos

= Tremarctinae =

Tremarctinae Temporal range: 5.6–0 Ma Late Miocene - Holocene

Subfamily of bears

The Tremarctinae or short-faced bears is a subfamily of Ursidae that contains one living representative, the spectacled bear (Tremarctos ornatus) of South America, and several extinct species from four genera: the Florida spectacled bear (Tremarctos floridanus), the North American giant short-faced bears Arctodus (A. pristinus and A. simus), the South American giant short-faced bear Arctotherium (including A. angustidens, A. vetustum, A. bonariense, A. wingei, and A. tarijense) as well as Plionarctos (P. edensis and P. harroldorum), which is thought to be ancestral to the other three genera. Of these, the giant short-faced bears (Arctodus simus and Arctotherium angustidens) may have been the largest ever carnivorans in the Americas. The group is thought to have originated in eastern North America, and then invaded South America as part of the Great American Interchange. Most short-faced bears became extinct at the end of the Pleistocene.

== Taxonomy ==
Tremarctinae was erected by John Merriam and Chester Stock in 1925. Traditionally, analyses of the phylogenetic inner relationships of tremarctines had Plionarctos and Tremarctos as basal groups with respect to a short-faced bear clade of Arctodus and Arctotherium. A study of the affinities of bears belonging to Arctotherium indicates that they were more closely related to the spectacled bear than to Arctodus, implying convergent evolution of large size in the two lineages. Tremarctines are occasionally referred to as arctodonts and/or arctotheres, or tremarctotheres in older scientific literature. A study in 2020 proposed a retention of this clade as Arctotheriini, but transferred into the subfamily Ursinae with traditionally ursine bears and their proposed ancestor Aurorarctos.

=== Diagnostics ===
==== Skull ====
Tremarctinae have deeper snouts and shorter nasal bones than ursine bears and generally possess well developed zygomatic arches and glenoid mandibular fossas, a premasseteric fossa on the mandible (except for Plionarctos), and often an entepicondylar foramen on the humerus of tremarctine bears. Moreover, tremarctine bears' orbits are also bigger, more rounded and lateralized than ursine bears. The premassateric fossa is used to detect maturity in tremarctine bears, with only adults possessing fully developed fossa. The features of tremarctine bear's individual morphology, such as dentition, can be quite variable (particularly the M2 molar). Unlike tremarctine bears, ursine bears have only one masseteric fossa on their mandible and more slender and elongated skulls, with generally narrower molars (with the exception of polar bears). Osteological differences between tremarctine and ursine bears also include an extra lateral cusp between the trigonid and talonid on the m1 molar.

==== Postcranial ====
The ichnotaxon Ursichnus sudamericanus is referred to Arctotherium tarijense; unlike the footprints of ursine bears, the heel impression is absent in the manus, and the digit III imprint is longer than the remaining digits. Being very similar to extant spectacled bears, Ursichnus sudamericanus suggests all tremarctines had long claws and five digits whose tips arrayed in a shallow arc. While all are plantigrade, Tremarctinaes can be distinguished between short-footed (Tremarctos) and long-footed forms (Arctodus).

== Evolution ==
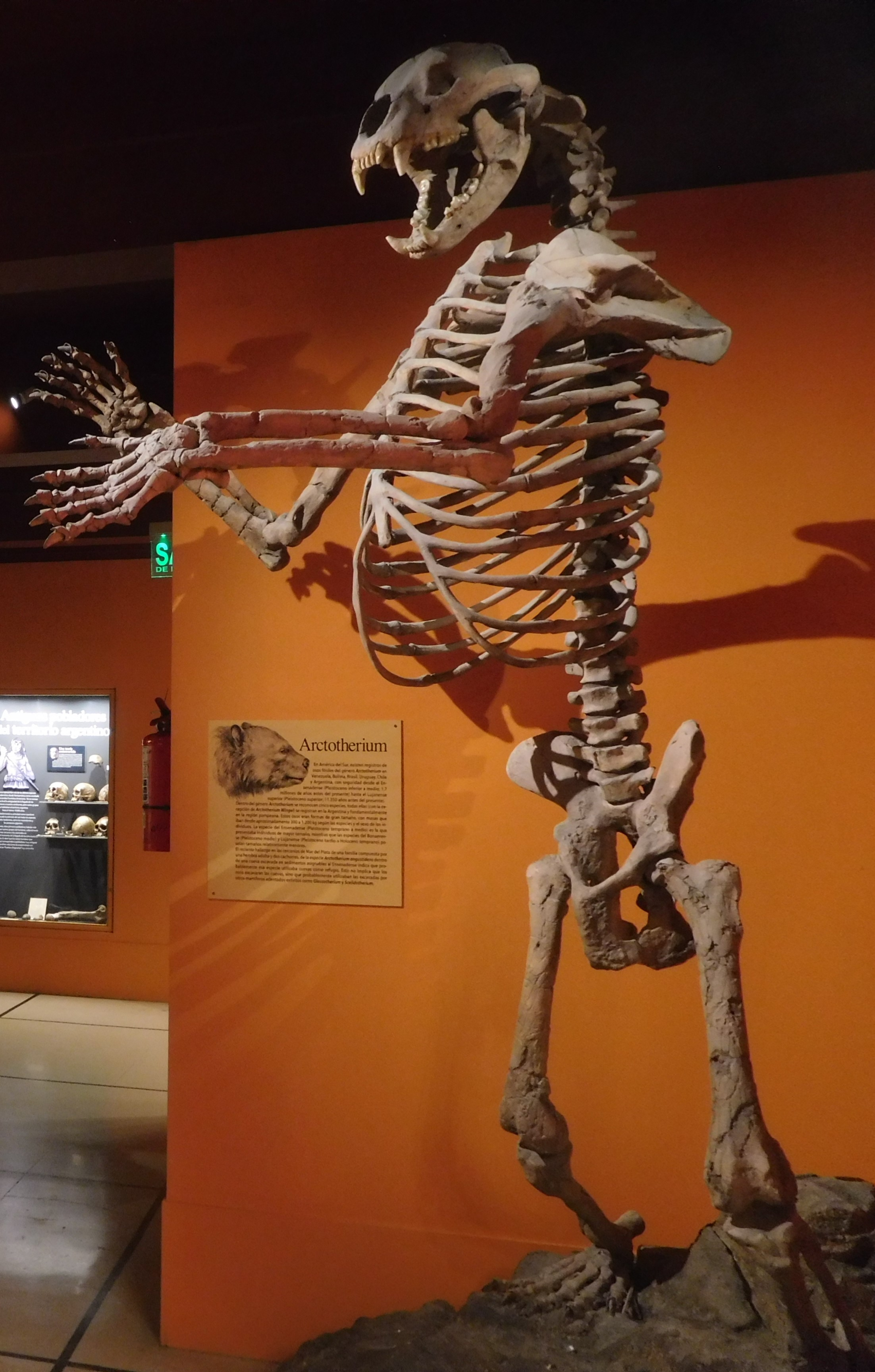
Skeleton of Arctotherium angustidens at the Museo Argentino de Ciencias Naturales Bernardino Rivadavia, Argentina.

=== Neogene origins ===
Tremarctinae originate with their common ancestor, Plionarctos, in the Hemphillian faunal stage (Late Miocene) of North America, with the oldest confirmed record of this genus dating to ~5.6Ma; Plionarctos is last recorded in the early Blancan faunal stage (Pliocene, ~3Ma). Around the Miocene-Pliocene boundary (~5.3 Ma), tremarctines, along with other ursids, experienced an explosive radiation in diversity, as C4 vegetation (grasses) and open habitats dominated, the world experienced a major temperature drop and increased seasonality, and a faunal turnover which extinguished 60–70% of all Eurasian faunal genera, and 70–80% of North American genera. Correspondingly, genetic studies suggest that the mean divergence dates for Arctotherium, Arctodus and Tremarctos were between 5.5Ma and 4.8Ma, and between Arctotherium and Tremarctos at 4.1 Ma. All three genera are first recorded from the Blancan (Pliocene/Pleistocene boundary) of North America. Preliminary research on the carnassial teeth of tremarctine bears demonstrate rapid and diverse morphological changes across the genera, suggesting rapid evolutionary change and specialization in comparison with other lineages of bears.

=== Quaternary expansion ===
In the Early Pleistocene, short-faced bears began to establish themselves more thoroughly in both North and South America. Indeterminate Arctotherium sp. are first recorded from the Plio-Pleistocene El Breal de Orocual tar pits in Venezuela, and the earliest Pleistocene (Gelasian) of El Salvador. The medium sized Arctodus pristinus inhabited a broad range on the North American continent, with Tremarctos floridanus endemic to the Gulf Coast. The first records of Arctotherium in South America come in the form of the gigantic Arctotherium angustidens, possibly the largest carnivorous land mammal ever, in Argentina circa 1 Ma. What the evolutionary history of Arctotherium in the previous 1.5 million years, and their history in South America, is unclear. In the Middle Pleistocene, both Arctodus and Arctotherium gave way to new forms; Arctodus pristinus gave way to the huge Arctodus simus, which inhabited a pan-continental range, from Alaska to Mexico. Arctotherium angustidens, on the other hand, was replaced by a series of smaller, medium-sized species- Arctotherium vetustum, then shortly thereafter by Arctotherium bonariense, and Arctotherium tarijense. Although the smaller Arctotherium wingei is only known from Late Pleistocene records, the species' more archaic position in the Arctotherium family tree also suggests an origin in the Middle Pleistocene. Arctotherium wingei was the only known species of Arctotherium to principally inhabit a range north of the Southern Cone, and to reinvade Central America.

=== Decline ===
By the terminal Pleistocene, Arctodus simus, Tremarctos floridanus, Arctotherium tarijense and Arctotherium wingei collectively occupied a range from Alaska to southernmost Patagonia. All of these forms were extinct by the end of the early Holocene. Around this time, Tremarctos ornatus, otherwise known as the spectacled bear, starts appearing in the South American fossil record. Scholars suggest that the spectacled bear migrated into Central and South America upon the extinction of Arctotherium wingei, if Pleistocene records of Andean Arctotherium sp. aren't confirmed as the spectacled bear.

== Paleobiology ==
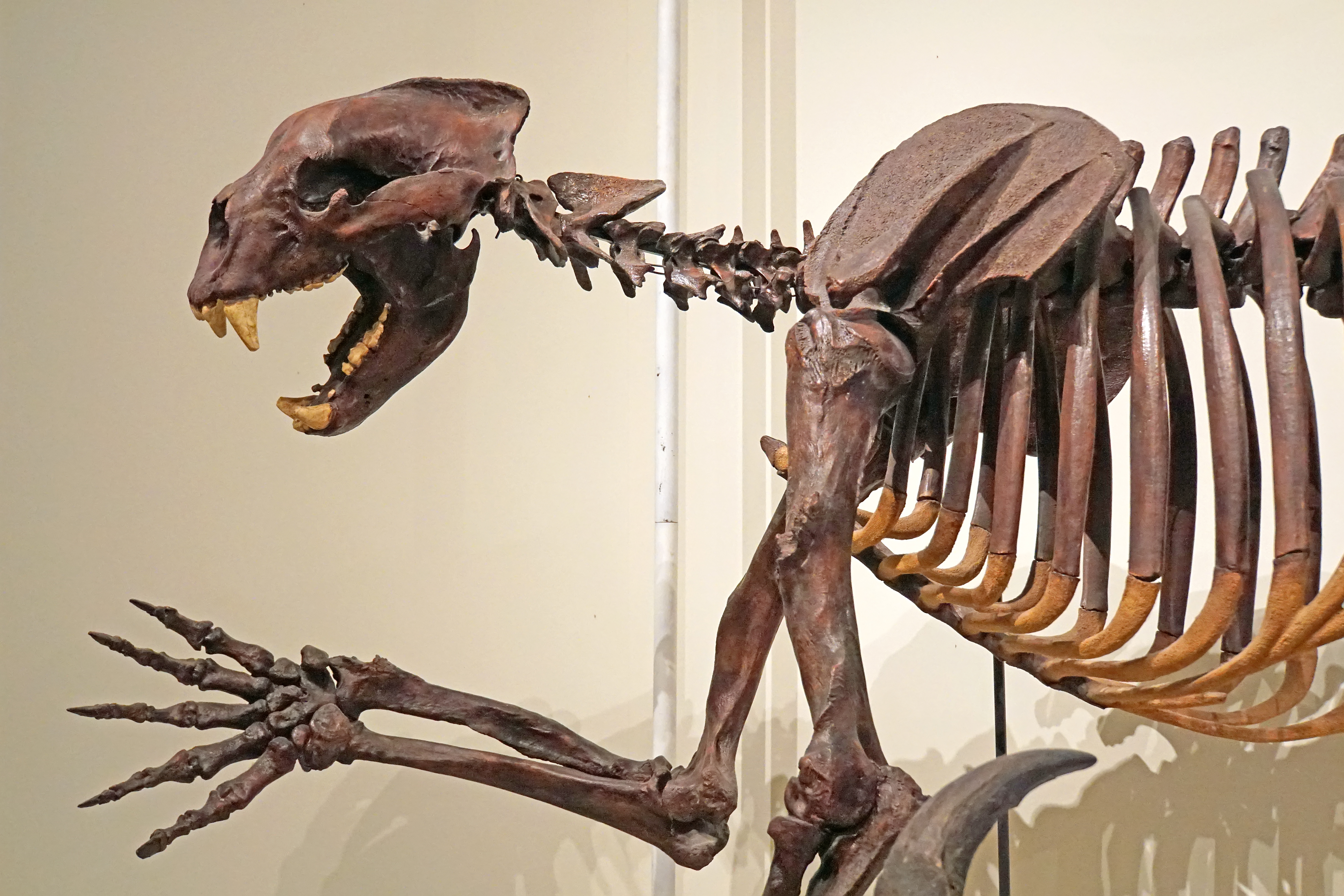
Skeletal reconstruction of Arctodus simus.

Tremarctines inhabited a wide range of niches- from small and mostly herbivorous bears inhabiting more forested habitat, such as Arctotherium wingei and Tremarctos ornatus, to the colossal Arctotherium angustidens and Arctodus simus; plains adapted omnivores with a penchant for large quantities of meat. Although the two giant species appear superficially similar, both species had key, significant differences. While Arctodus simus had a wide range across North America for 800,000 years, Arctotherium angustidens appears to be limited to the Southern Cone, in open plains habitat. Furthermore, whereas Arctodus simus varied its diet between quasi-carnivory in Alaska to classic omnivory, Arctotherium angustidens had similar rates of carnivory across specimens, according to isotope studies. Additionally, the much more gracile form of Arctodus, in contrast with the robust Arctotherium angustidens, has puzzled researchers. However, it has been posited that the Pliocene extinctions of scavenger-niche mega-carnivores, such as the procyonid Chapalmalania in South America, and both Borophagus and Agriotherium in North America, was a shared impetus for gigantism in Arctodus and Arctotherium.

Arctodus and Tremarctos share characteristics common to herbivorous bears. This includes cheek teeth with large surface areas, a deep mandible, and large mandibular muscle attachments. Because herbivorous carnivorans lack an efficient digestive tract for breaking down plant matter via microbial action, they must break down plant matter via extensive chewing or grinding, and thus possess features to create a high mechanical advantage of the jaw. This presents the possibility that these traits may be an ancestral condition of the group, if not an indication of their preferred dietary habits.

== Systematics ==
Tremarctinae within Ursidae

- †Hemicyoninae
- - †Ursavinae
  - - †Agriotheriinae
    - - Ailuropodinae
      - - Ursinae
        - - Tremarctinae (short‑faced bears)
            - †Plionarctos
            - - †Arctodus
              - - Tremarctos
                - †Arctotherium

The following taxonomy of the tremarctine bears follow by Mitchell et al. (2016):

- Subfamily Tremarctinae Merriam & Stock, 1925
  - †Plionarctos Frick, 1926
    - †Plionarctos edensis Frick, 1926
    - †Plionarctos harroldorum Tedford & Martin, 2001
  - †Arctodus Leidy, 1854
    - †Arctodus pristinus Leidy, 1854
    - †Arctodus simus Cope, 1879
  - †Arctotherium Burmeister, 1879
    - †Arctotherium angustidens Gervais & Ameghino, 1880
    - †Arctotherium bonariense Gervais, 1852
    - †Arctotherium tarijense Ameghino, 1902
    - †Arctotherium vetustum Ameghino, 1885
    - †Arctotherium wingei Ameghino, 1902
  - Tremarctos Gervais, 1855
    - †Tremarctos floridanus (Gildey, 1928)
    - Tremarctos ornatus (Cuvier, 1825) – spectacled bear

== See also ==
- Pleistocene megafauna
- Pleistocene extinctions
