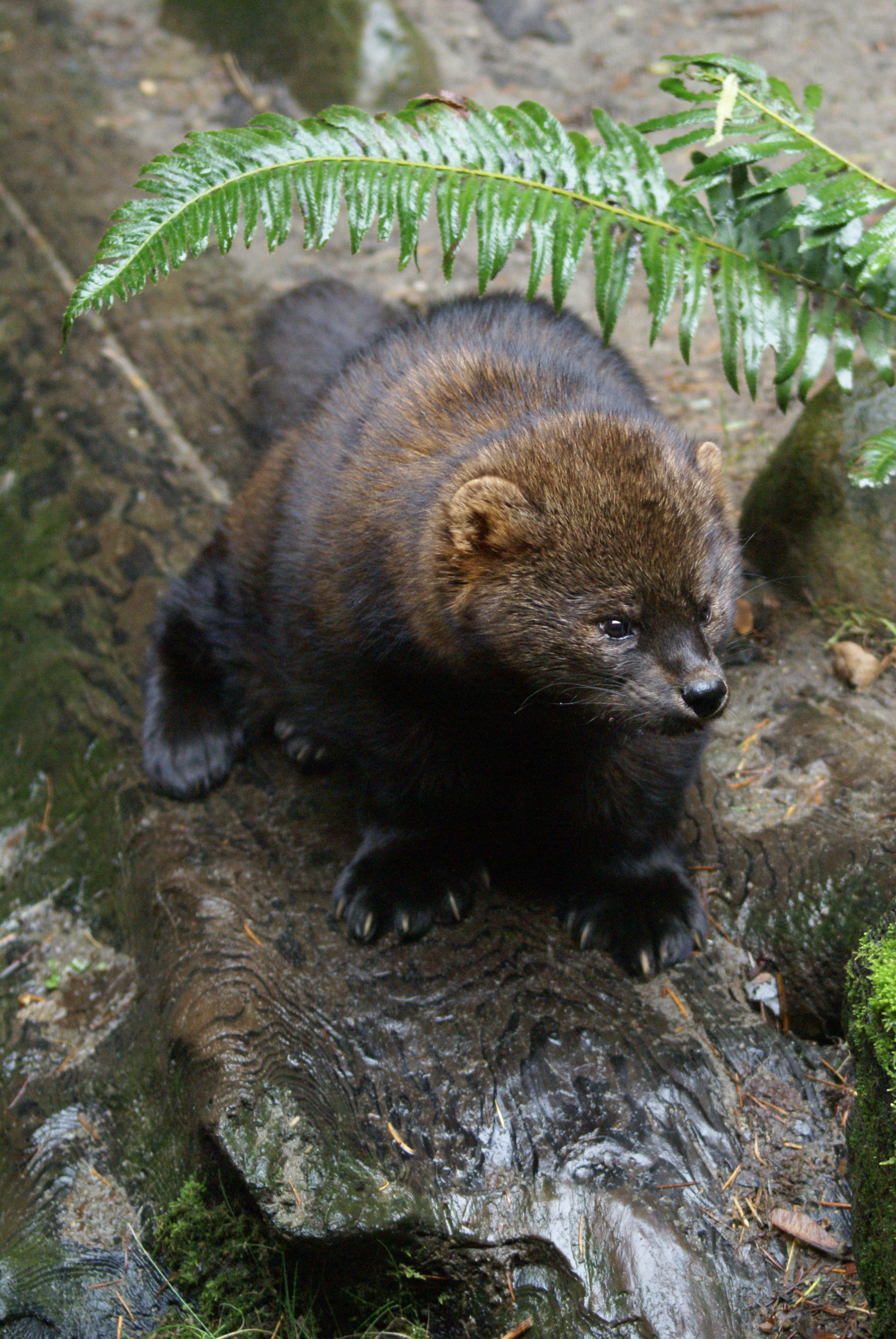
- Fisher (Pekania pennanti)

Scientific classification
- Kingdom: Animalia
- Phylum: Chordata
- Class: Mammalia
- Order: Carnivora
- Family: Mustelidae
- Subfamily: Guloninae
- Genus: Pekania; Gray, 1865

Type species
- Martes pennanti Erxleben, 1777

Species
- Pekania pennanti; †Pekania diluviana; †Pekania occulta; †Pekania palaeosinensis

= Pekania =

Pekania Temporal range: Pliocene – Recent

Genus of mammal

Pekania is a genus of mustelid that contains a single living species, the fisher (Pekania pennanti). Formerly placed in the genus Martes, it was determined to be distinct enough to be placed within its own genus. A 2013 study also identified several fossil species formerly in Martes that are more closely related – and probably ancestral – to the fisher, moving them into Pekania as well.

== Taxonomy ==
The fisher was for many years placed in the genus Martes. A 2008 study using DNA sequences found the remaining species of Martes to be more closely related to the wolverine (genus Gulo) than to the fisher, rendering Martes paraphyletic. Therefore, the fisher was reclassified in the separate genus Pekania. Current studies suggest that the fisher is more closely related to the wolverine and tayra than it is to martens, confirming its placement in the separate genus.

=== Evolution ===
The earliest known fossil member of Pekania is P. occulta from the Rattlesnake Formation of Oregon, which is about 7 million years old but already very similar to the fisher. Although endemic to North America today, Pekania may also have occurred in Asia in the past, with the first species known from between 2.5 and 5.0 million years ago. Two extinct members of the genus known from East Asia are Pekania palaeosinensis and P. anderssoni, though P. anderssoni is often considered to be a synonym of P. palaeosinensis. Another North American member of the genus, P. diluviana, has only been found in Middle Pleistocene North America. P. diluviana is strongly indicated to be related to the Asian finds, which suggests a migration. The modern fisher has been found as early as the Late Pleistocene era, about 125,000 years ago. No major differences are seen between the Pleistocene fisher and the modern fisher. Fossil evidence indicates that the fisher's range extended farther south than it does today.
