= Mt. Eden Formation =

Geologic formation in Riverside County, California

Mount Eden Formation of Fraser (1931)
- Stratigraphic range: Neogene
- Type: Formation

Location
- Coordinates: 33.867785°N 117.0408293°W
- Region: California
- Country: United States

The Mt. Eden Formation is a geologic formation in Riverside County, California. It underlies the San Timoteo Formation, and preserves fossils dating back to the Neogene period.

== Discovery and nomenclature ==
This geologic formation was initially described in 1921 by paleontologist Childs Frick, who considered the San Timoteo Badlands to be split into three lithologic parts: (1) the Potrero Creek deposits, (2) the San Timoteo Formation, and (3) the Eden beds. The word "Eden" was taken from a large hill of schist located just west of the San Jacinto quadrangle. By 1931, the term "Mt. Eden formation" became prevalent while the term "Eden beds" fell into disuse, and the Potrero Creek deposits ceased to be considered a separate entity.

== See also ==
- List of fossiliferous stratigraphic units in California
- Paleontology in California

== Bibliography ==
- Various Contributors to the Paleobiology Database. "Fossilworks: Gateway to the Paleobiology Database".
- USGS map
- USGS description of map
