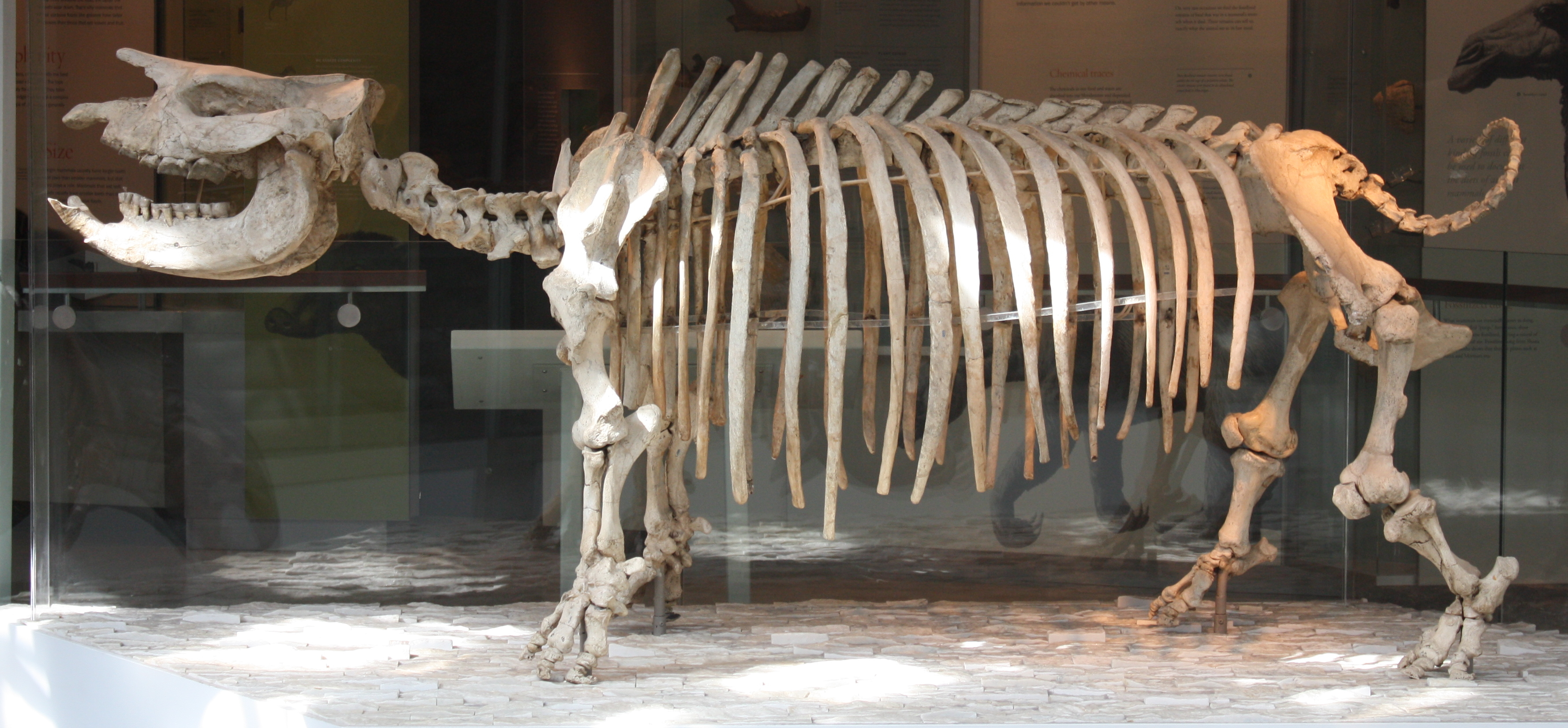
- Specimen at the Natural History Museum of LA
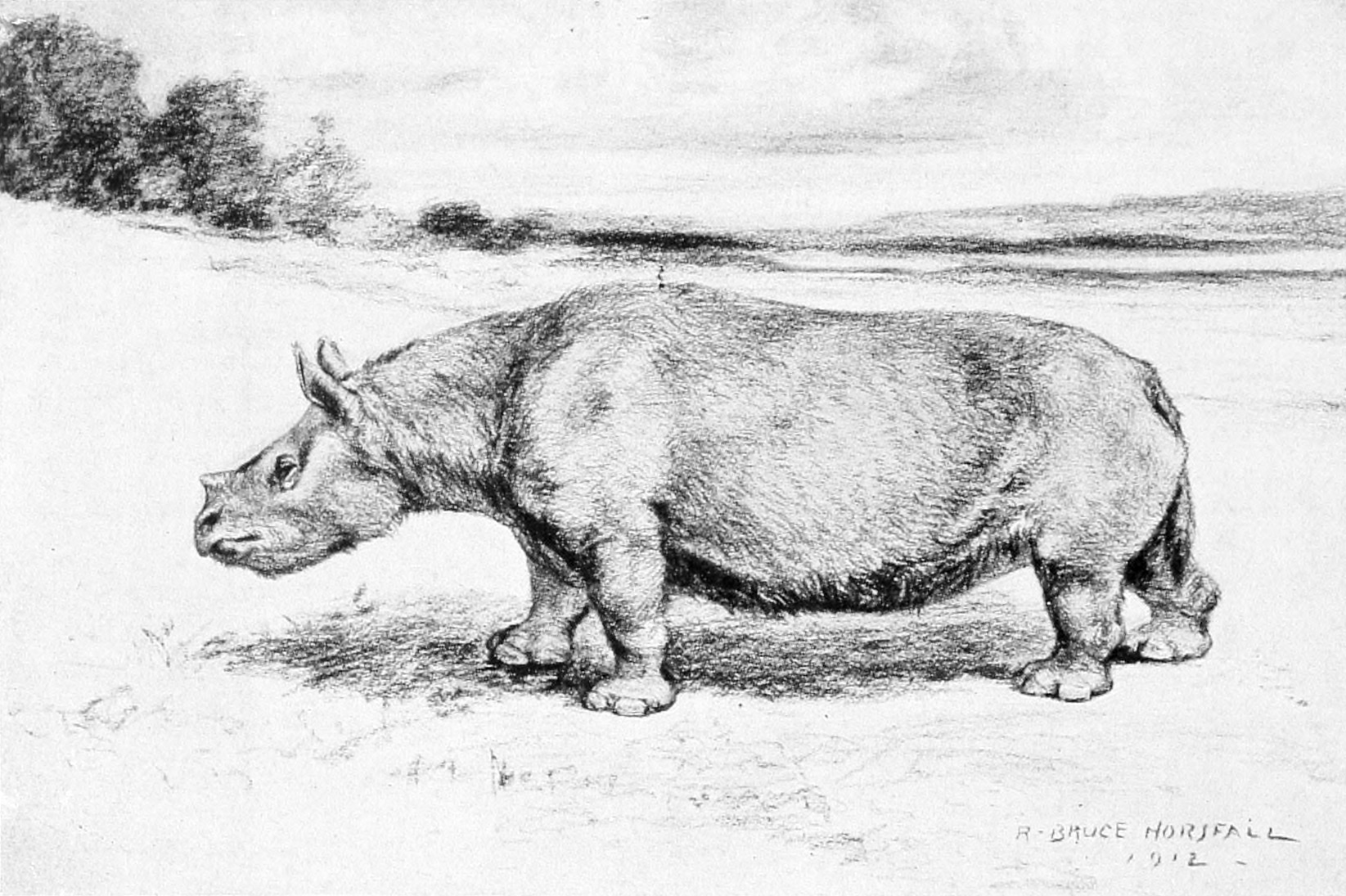
- 1913 T. fossiger illustration by Robert Bruce Horsfall

Scientific classification
- Kingdom: Animalia
- Phylum: Chordata
- Class: Mammalia
- Order: Perissodactyla
- Family: Rhinocerotidae
- Subfamily: †Aceratheriinae
- Tribe: †Teleoceratini
- Genus: †Teleoceras; Hatcher, 1894

Type species
- †Teleoceras major

Species
- †T. aepysoma; †T. aginense; †T. americanum; †T. brachyrhinum; †T. hicksi; †T. fossiger; †T. guymonense; †T. major; †T. medicornutum; †T. meridianum; †T. proterum

Synonyms
- †Mesoceras (Cook, 1930); †Paraphelops Lane, 1927

= Teleoceras =

Teleoceras Temporal range: ~15.97–4.5 Ma Barstovian-Blancan

Extinct genus of mammals

Teleoceras is an extinct genus of rhinocerotid endemic to North America during the Neogene (Miocene and Pliocene).

== Description ==
Teleoceras had much shorter legs than modern rhinos, and a barrel chest, making its build more like that of a hippopotamus than a modern rhino. It grew up to lengths of 13 feet (4.0 meters) long. T. major was found to have been sexually dimorphic, with males being larger than females. Based on the most reliable method, non-length longbones, males could’ve weighed 883.3–1,109.7 kg (1,947–2,446 lb), while females were estimated to have weighed 785.1–840.1 kg (1,731–1,852 lb).

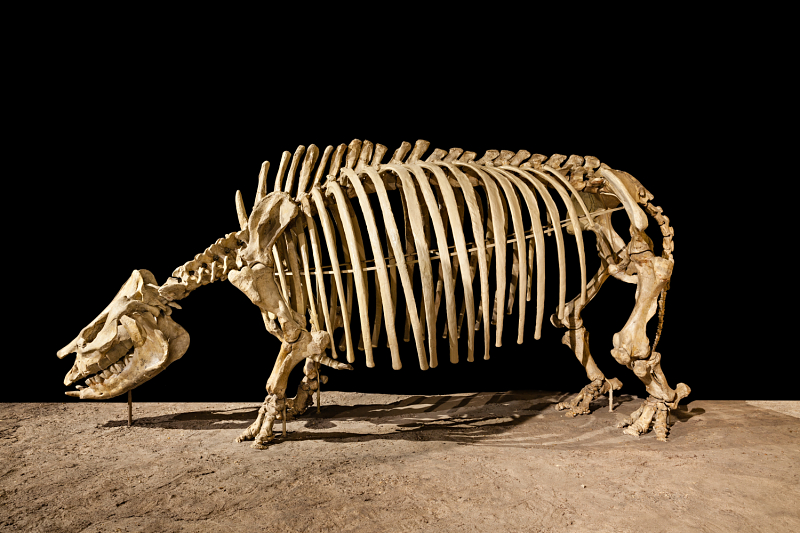
T. fossiger, National Museum of Natural History.

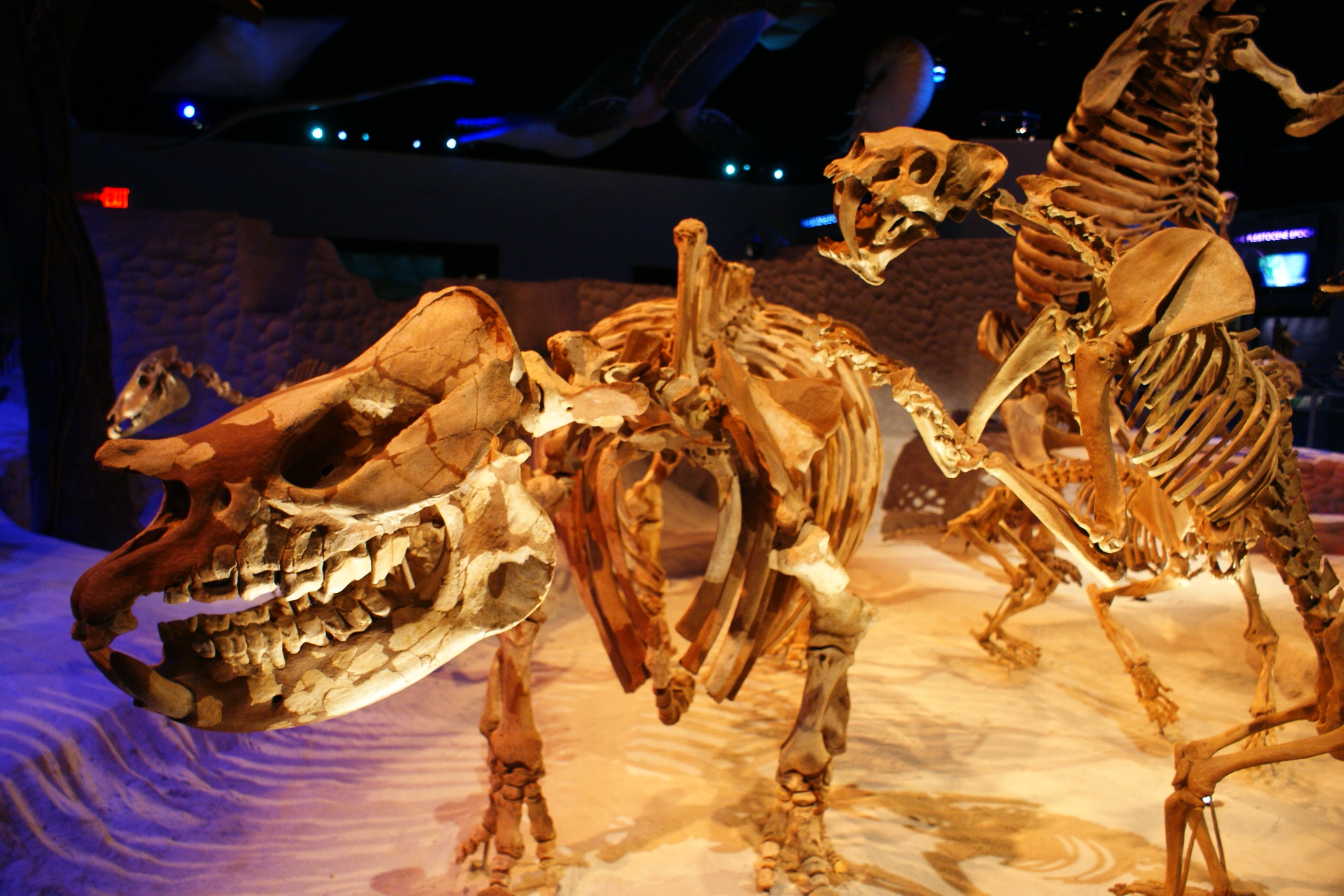
T. proterum and Barbourofelis loveorum, FLMNH.

Some species of Teleoceras have a small nasal horn, but this appears to be absent in other species such as T. aepysoma.

== Behavior and paleoecology ==
Teleoceras has high crowned (hypsodont) molar teeth, which has historically led to suggestions that the species were grazers. Dental microwear and mesowear analysis alternatively suggest a browsing or mixed feeding (both browsing and grazing) diet. Whether or not Teleoceras was semi-aquatic had been debated by experts. Based on this description, Henry Fairfield Osborn suggested in 1898 that it was semi-aquatic and hippo-like in habits, however and oxygen isotope analysis of tooth enamel suggests hippo-like grazing habits, but not aquatic. However, δ^{18}O measurements from Ashfall suggest that the species T. major was semi-aquatic. Further evidence of the dependence on water of T. major comes from combined studies of its enamel ^{87}Sr/^{86}Sr, δ^{13}C, and δ^{18}O, which show its lifetime movement patterns were mostly restricted to areas with high water availability.

Skulls

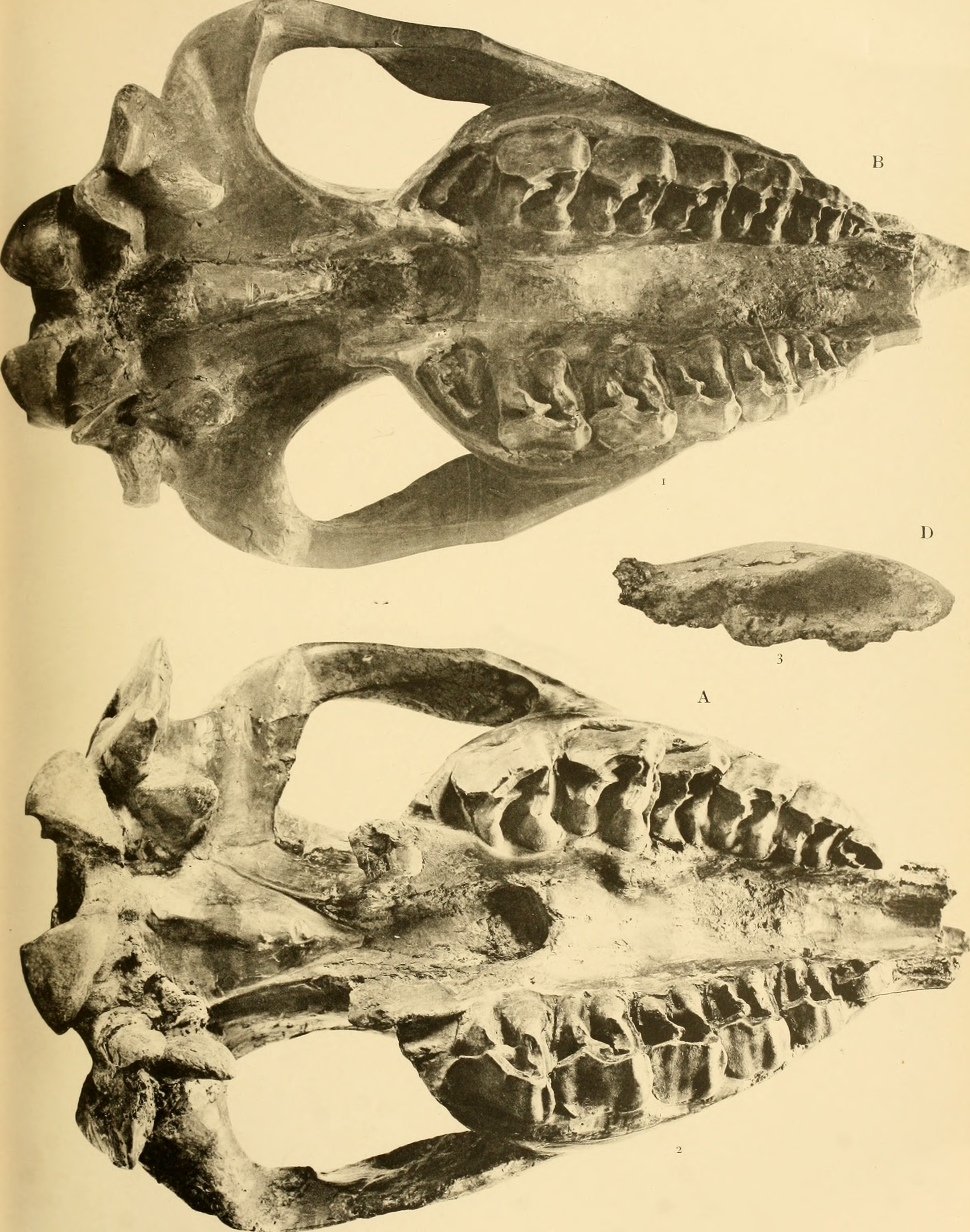
T. aginense

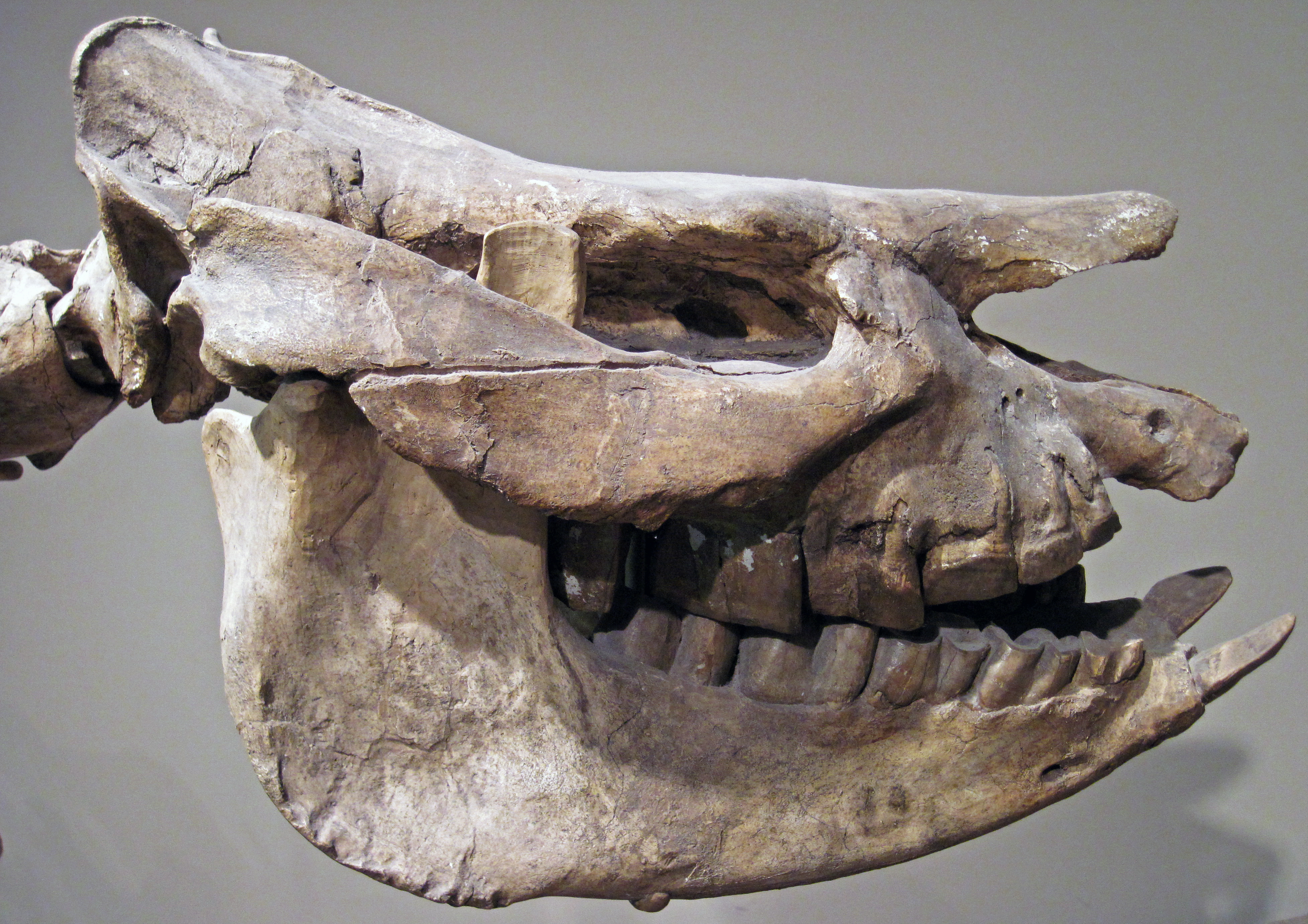
T. fossiger, Kansas.

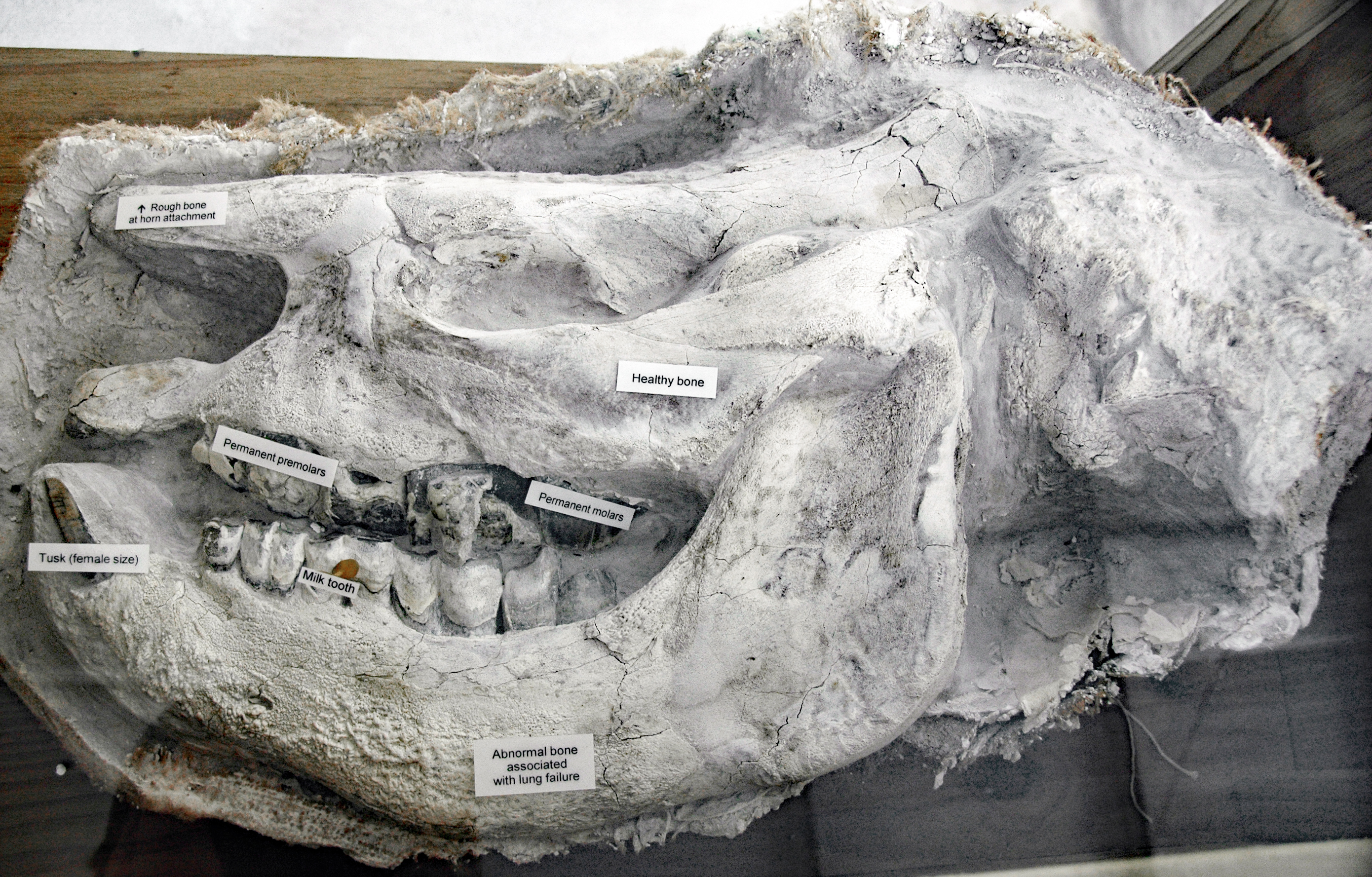
Young female T. major, Nebraska.

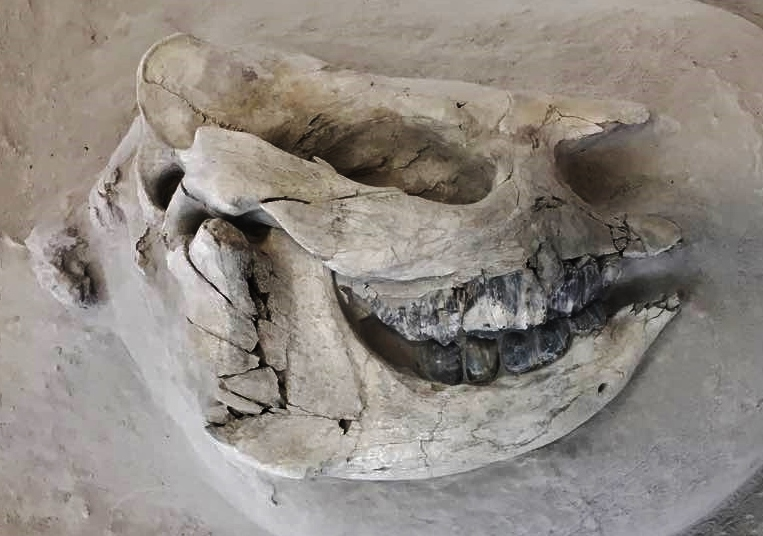
Baby.

=== Social behavior ===
Teleoceras was sexually dimorphic. Males were larger, with larger tusks (lower incisors), a more massive head and neck, and significantly larger forelimbs. As a result of bimaturism, females matured and stopped growing before males, which is often seen in extant polygynous mammals. Males may have fought for mating rights; healed wounds on skulls have been observed, and healed broken ribs are not uncommon (although not all have their sexes determined). This is further supported by the breeding age female-to-male ratio in the Ashfall Fossil Beds being 4.25:1. There is also a rarity of young adult males preserved at Ashfall, which may be accounted for if they formed bachelor herds away from females and dominant bulls.

=== Paleoenvironment ===
Teleoceras was endemic to North America during the Miocene during the Hemingfordian faunal stage to the end of Hemphillian faunal stage from around 17.5 to 4.9 million years ago, and is considered an index fauna of the Hemphillian. However, several boundary / Blancan faunal stage specimens have been recovered from Pliocene era North America, including the Ringold Formation of Washington, the Beck Ranch fauna of Texas, the Pipe Creek sinkhole fauna of Indiana and the Saw Rock Canyon fauna of Kansas.

The presence of Plionarctos and Teleoceras have been used to constrain the temporal ages of the Gray Fossil Site, Palmetto fauna and Pipe Creek Sinkhole to the Hemphillian (between 7Mya and 4.5Mya, late Miocene to early Pliocene), however specimens of these index fossils younger than 4.5Mya put this temporal bracketing in doubt.

== Important sites ==
=== Ashfall Fossil Beds ===
Teleoceras major is the most common fossil in the Ashfall Fossil Beds of Nebraska. Over 100 intact T. major skeletons are preserved in ash from the Bruneau-Jarbidge supervolcanic eruption. Of the 20+ taxa present, T. major was buried above the rest, being the last of the animals to succumb (small animals died faster), several weeks or months after the pyroclastic airfall event. Their skeletons show evidence of bone disease, i.e. hypertrophic pulmonary osteodystrophy (HPOD), as a result of lung failure from the fine volcanic ash.

Most of the skeletons are adult females and young, the breeding age female-to-male ratio being 4.25:1. There is also a rarity of young adult males. If the rhinos at Ashfall represent a herd, this may be accounted for if young adult males formed bachelor herds away from females and dominant bulls. The age demographic is very similar to that of modern hippo herds, as amongst the skeletons, 54% are immature, 30% are young adults, and 16% are older adults.

The greatest concentration of Ashfall fossils is housed in a building called the "Rhino Barn", due to the prevalence of T. major skeletons at the site, of which most were preserved in a nearly complete state. One extraordinary specimen includes the remains of a Teleoceras calf trying to suckle from its mother.

T. major from the Ashfall Fossil Beds

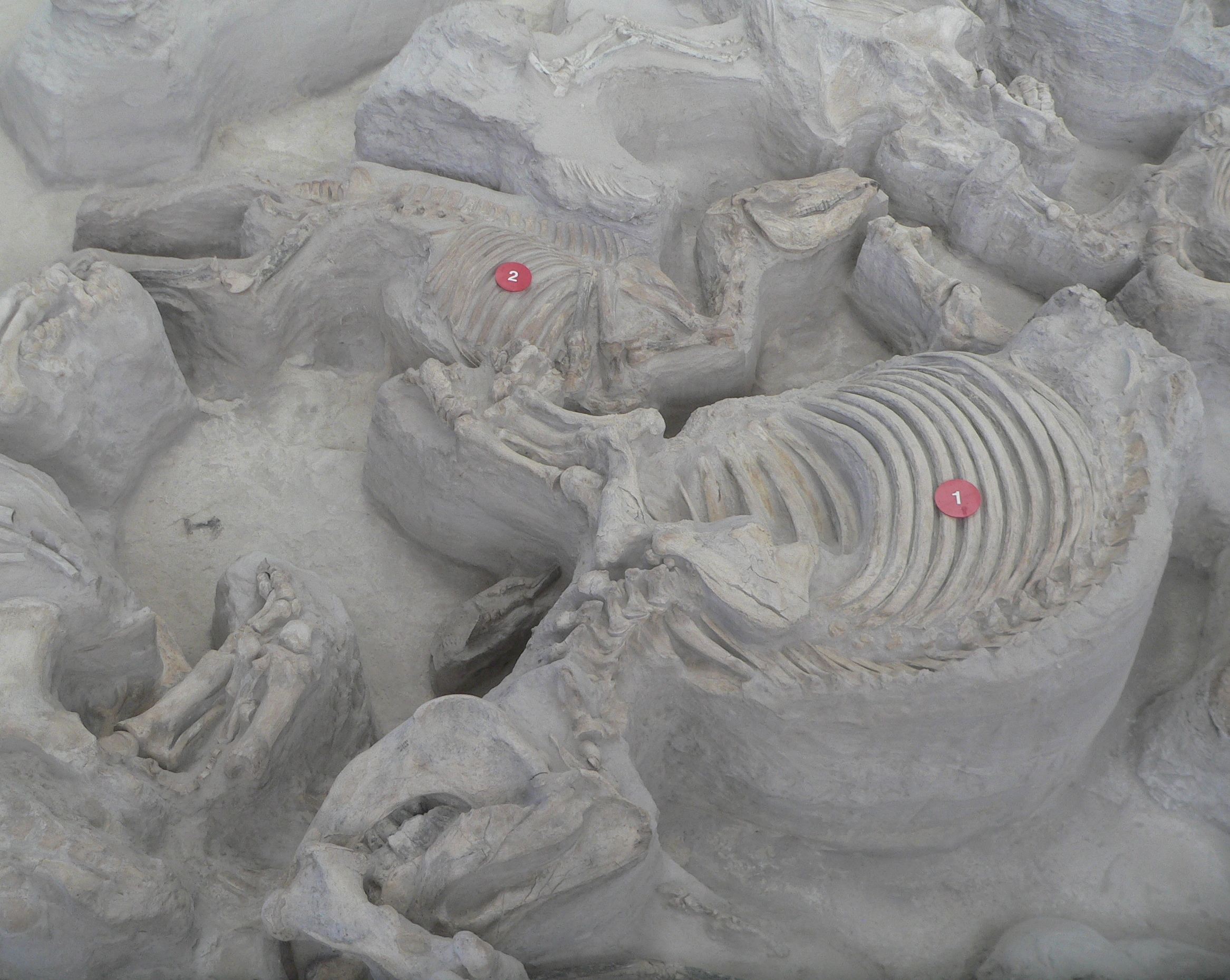
(1) 8-9 year old young adult male "Tusker". Wisdom teeth emerging. (2) Cormohipparion occidentale

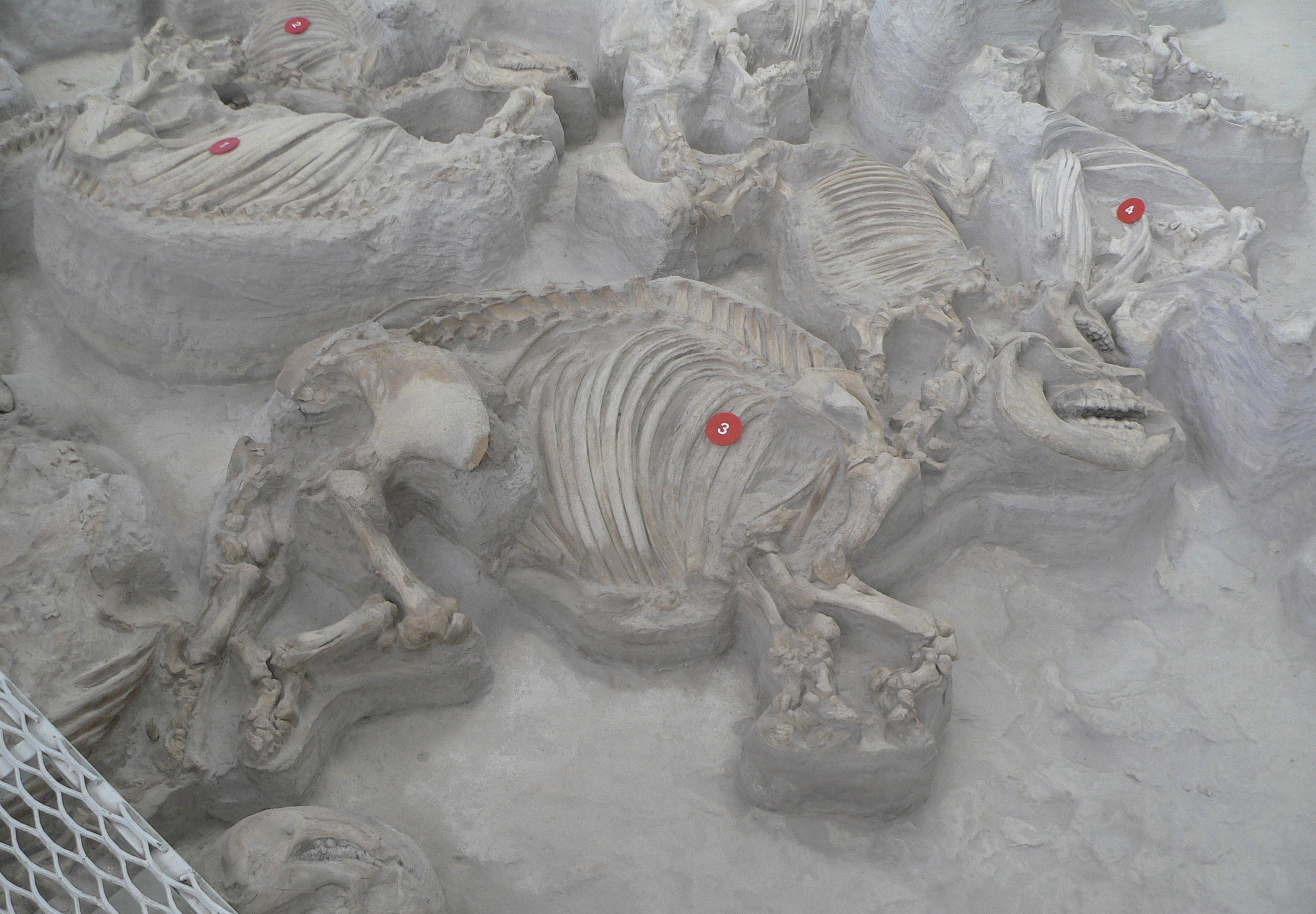
(3) Adult female "Sandy" (4) Calf "Justin".

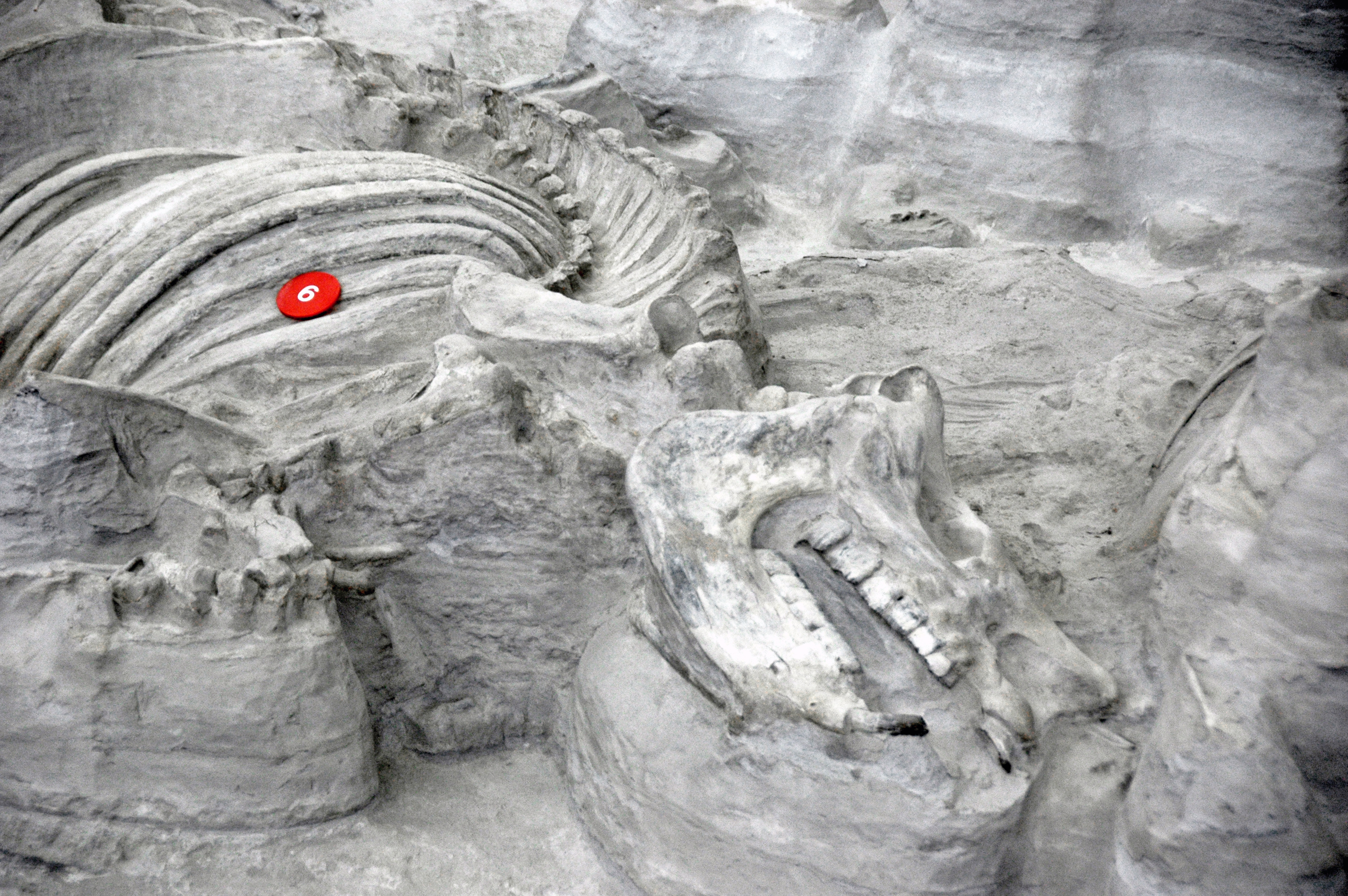
10-12 year old adult male "Dr. Marie", with all permanent teeth.

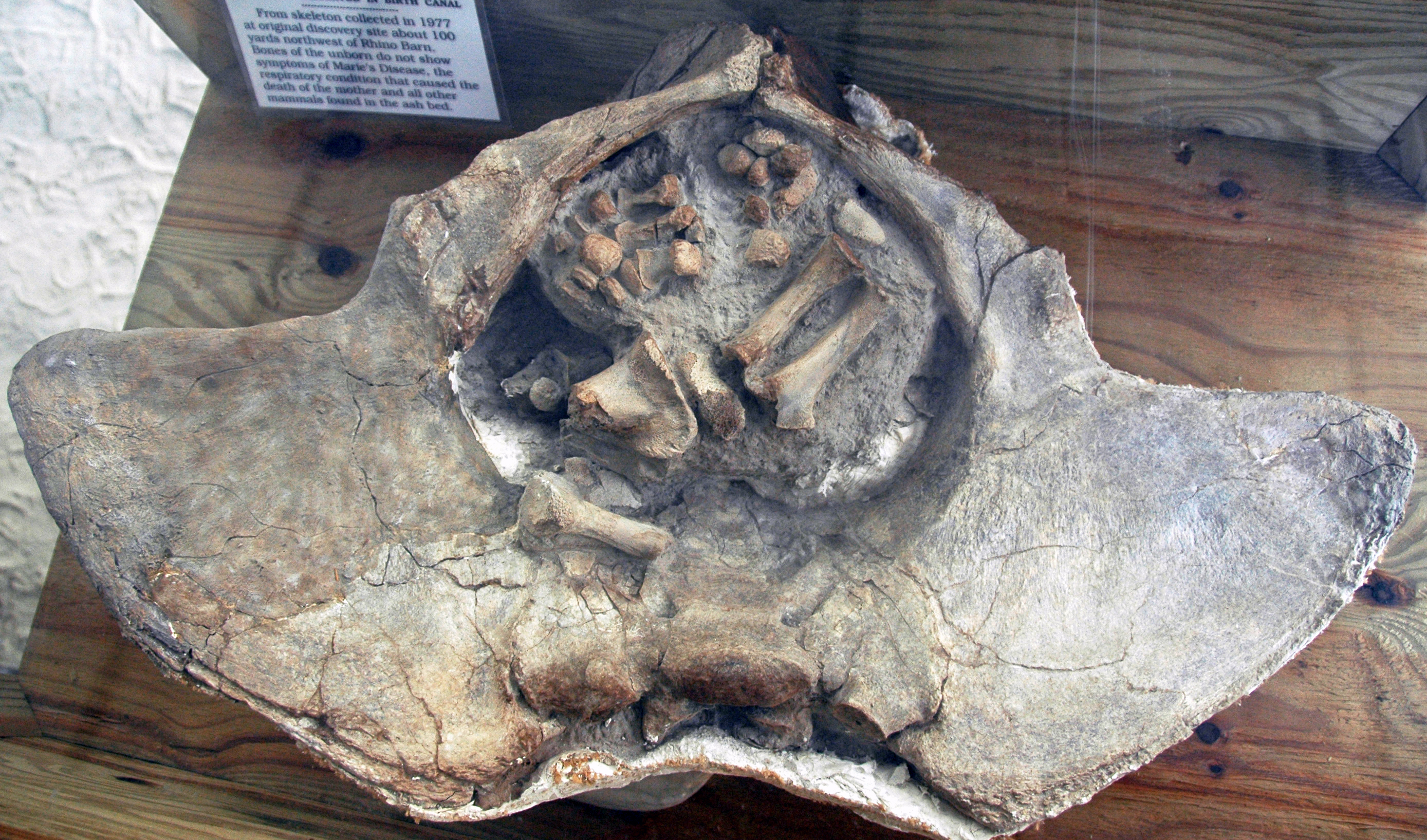
Fetus within birth canal of the pelvis.

=== Gray Fossil Site ===
The Gray Fossil Site in northeast Tennessee, dated to 4.5-5 million years ago, hosts one of the latest-known populations of Teleoceras, Teleoceras aepysoma.

== Extinction ==
Teleoceras is typically thought to have gone extinct in North America (alongside Aphelops) at the end of the Hemphillian, most likely due to rapid climate cooling, increased seasonality and expansion of C4 grasses, as isotopic evidence suggests that the uptake of C4 plants was far less than that in contemporary horses. However, Blancan age specimens may be younger than 4.5 million years old, and may be as young as 3.5 million years old (although some sites are disputed).
