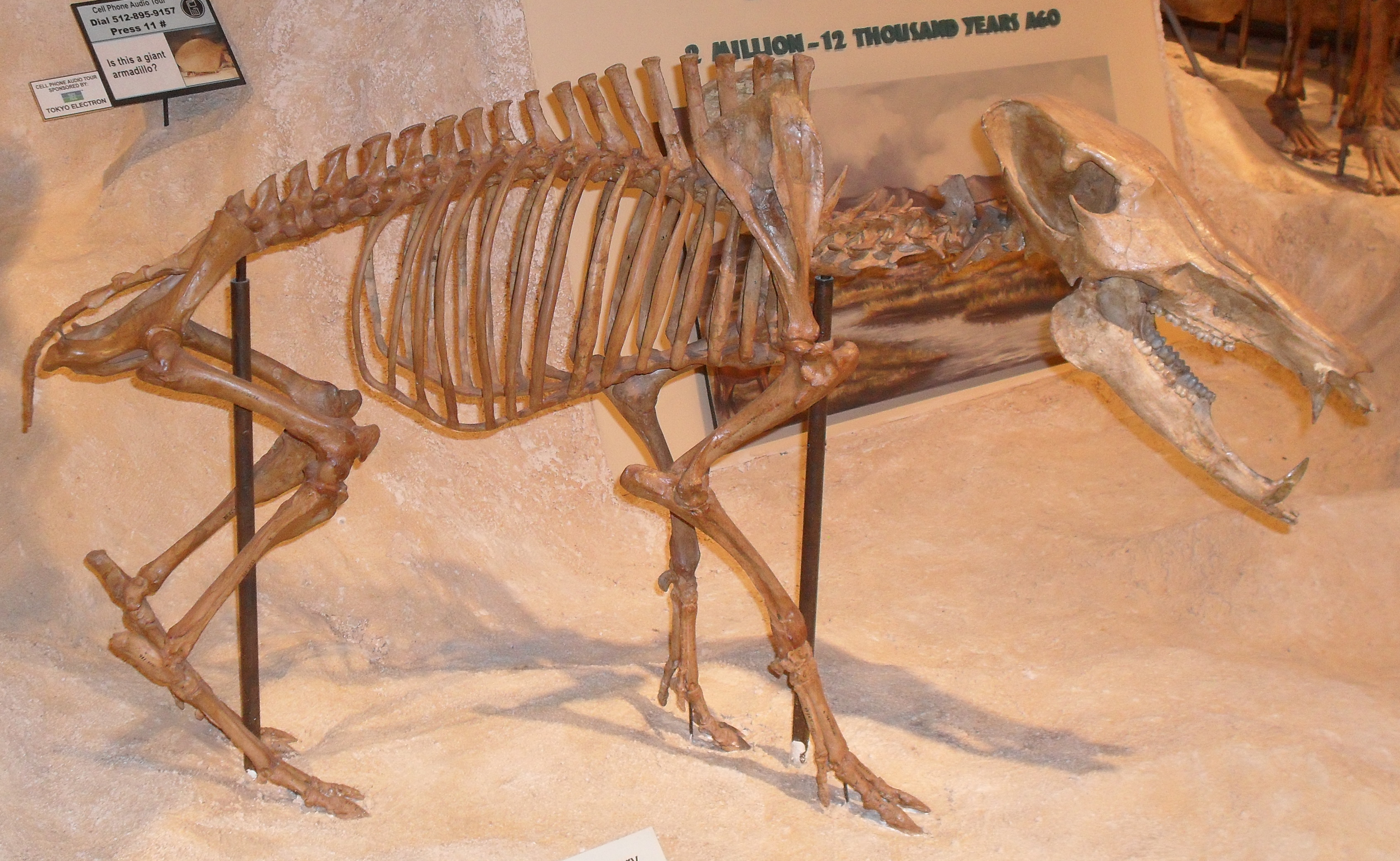
- M. nasutus, Texas Science & Natural History Museum

Scientific classification
- Kingdom: Animalia
- Phylum: Chordata
- Class: Mammalia
- Infraclass: Placentalia
- Order: Artiodactyla
- Family: Tayassuidae
- Genus: †Mylohyus; Cope, 1869

Species
- M. elmorei; M. floridanus; M. fossilis; M. gidleyi; M. nasutus (long-nosed peccary)

= Mylohyus =

Mylohyus Temporal range: Pliocene - Early Holocene, 5–0.009 Ma

Extinct genus of even-toed ungulate mammals

Mylohyus is an extinct genus of peccary found in North and Central America. It first evolved during the Late Miocene and became extinct at the end of the Pleistocene, around 12,000 years ago, during the Late Pleistocene megafaunal extinction.

Six species were known, the most famous being Mylohyus nasutus, also known as the long-nosed peccary. It went extinct at the end of the Rancholabrean North American land mammal age. The genus was slightly larger-bodied than any modern peccaries, with an estimated mass of 68 kg (150 lb).

== Taxonomy ==
The species Mylohyus elmorei, initially classified under the genus Prosthennops, was moved to the genus Mylohyus in 1984.

== Description ==
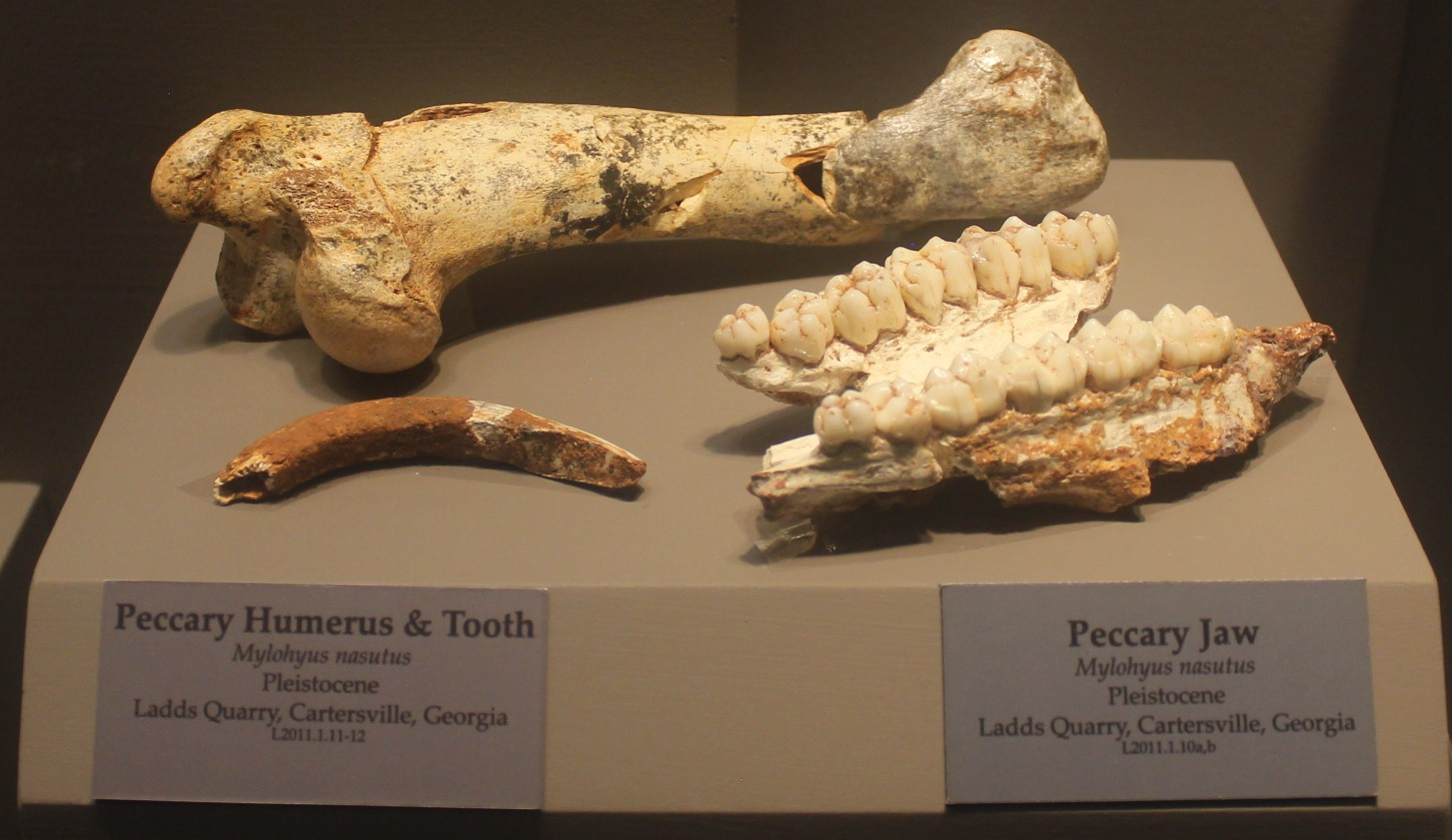
Jaw, humerus and tooth from M. nasutus at the Tellus Science Museum

The long-nosed peccary was about 0.75 metres (2.5 ft) in height and 67 kilograms (148 lb) in weight. It had an elongated face, long, thin legs and dewclaws.

== Habitat and distribution ==
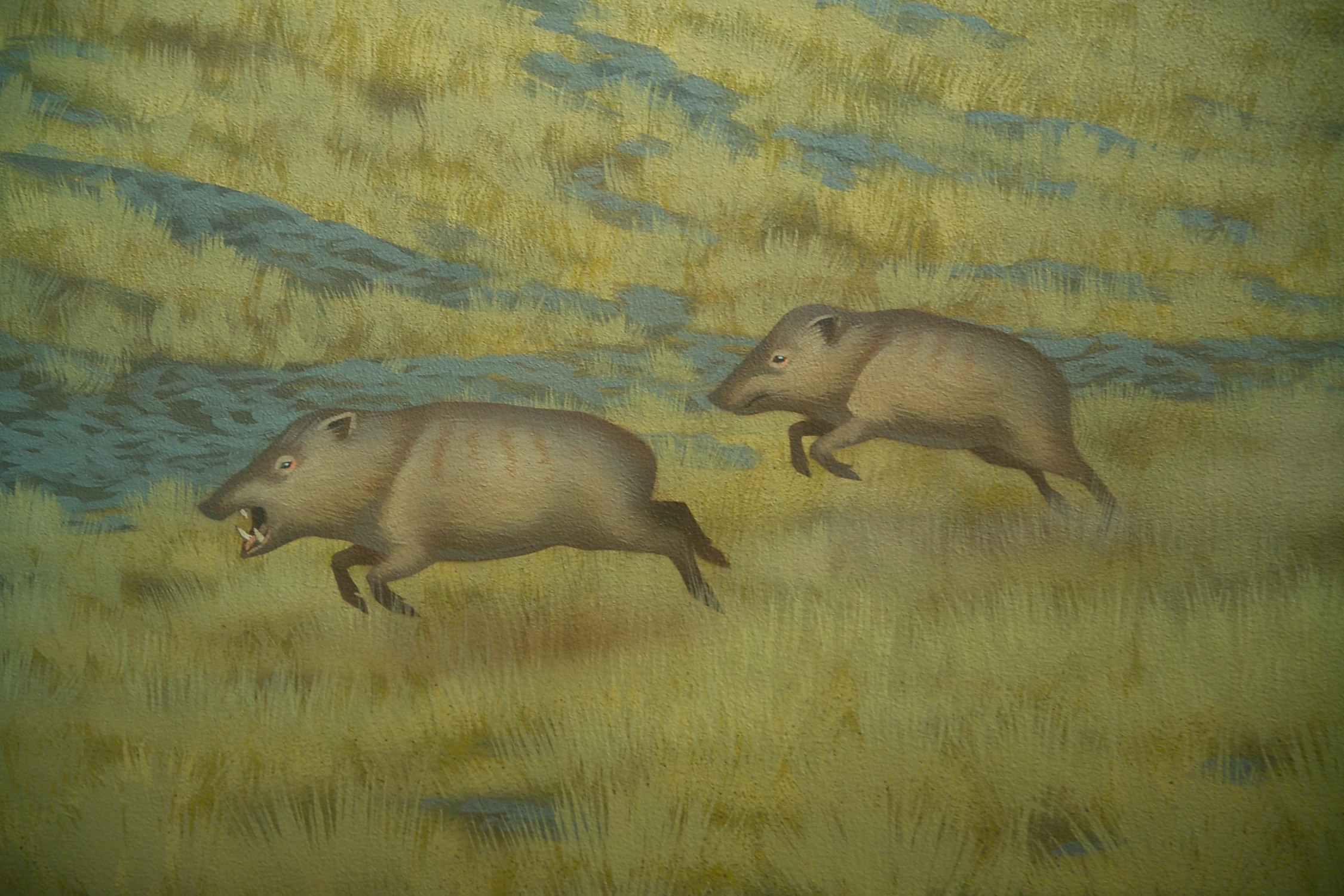
Life restoration of a pair of M. longirostris

During the last glacial, long-nosed peccaries, sensu lato, were distributed throughout southeastern North America with concentrations in Appalachia and Florida. Most fossil localities containing this species are found in the southern and south-eastern U.S., from west Texas to Florida, and north to Pennsylvania. Mylohyus nasutus, if considered to be a different species than M. fossilis, occupied the western part of this range, but their classification as separate species is disputed. According to Lundelius, these species or forms co-occur in the Cumberland Cave deposits in Maryland.

== Palaeobiology ==
=== Social behaviour ===
Unlike the flat-headed peccary, Platygonus compressus, the long-nosed peccary was probably a solitary animal and did not frequent caves.

=== Palaeoecology ===
Stable isotopic and anatomical studies have suggested that the diet of Mylohyus varied over geological time, from being primarily a C_{3} browser during the Blancan to an increasing consumption of C_{4} vegetation during the Irvingtonian, with a relatively even mixture of C_{3} and C_{4} plants by the time of the Rancholabrean. Suggestions have been made based on the textural patterns of its dental microwear that it was frugivorous and also consumed hard browse like twigs. Mylohyus was able to coexist with close phylogenetic relatives because of efficient niche partitioning between it and other genera of peccaries. The presence of the species M. elmorei in the Gray Fossil Site has been invoked as evidence of the palaeoenvironment being highly forested due to the association of the species with forests.
