= Taunton, Washington =

Ghost town in Washington, United States

- Ghost town
- Location within Washington (state) Location within the United States
- Coordinates: 46°48′11″N 119°20′44″W
- Country: United States
- State: Washington
- County: Adams
- Time zone: UTC-8 (Pacific (PST))
  - Summer (DST): UTC-7 (PDT)

Taunton was a town in Adams County, Washington.

A post office called Taunton operated from 1908 to 1913. The community was named by railroad officials after Taunton, Massachusetts.

== See also ==
- List of ghost towns in Washington
