= Varela =

Varela is a Galician, Spanish and Portuguese surname originating from Galicia.

Notable people with the surname include:

- Abigail Varela (born 1948), Venezuelan artist
- Adilson Tavares Varela (born 1988), footballer
- Adrián Varela (born 1984), Mexican reality show contestant
- Adriana Varela (born 1952), Argentine tango singer
- Alan Varela (born 2001), Argentine footballer
- Alberto Varela (born 1940), Uruguayan fencer
- Alejandro Varela (born 1979), Spanish footballer
- Alejandro Varela (born 1979), American fiction writer
- Alfredo Varela (disambiguation), several people
- Amancio (footballer), full name Amancio Amaro Varela (1939–2023), Spanish footballer
- Ângelo Varela (born 1980), Portuguese footballer
- Antonio María Rouco Varela (born 1936), Spanish Catholic cardinal
- Benjamin Varela (born 1955), Puerto Rican wrestler
- Blanca Varela (1926–2009), Peruvian poet
- Brianna Varela, see List of Survivor (American TV series) contestants
- Bruno Varela (born 1994), Portuguese footballer
- Carlos Varela (disambiguation), several people
- Conny Varela (born 1954), Puerto Rican politician
- Cristopher Varela (born 1999), Venezuelan footballer
- Cybèle Varela (born 1943), Brazilian artist
- Daniel Varela Suanzes-Carpegna (born 1951), Spanish politician
- Daniela Varela, Portuguese singer and songwriter
- Edgar Varela (baseball) (born 1980), American baseball player and coach
- Eduardo Varela, Mexican journalist
- Enrique Bermúdez Varela (1932–1991), Nicaraguan soldier and rebel
- Erika Varela (born 1994), Mexican cyclist
- Euclides Varela (born 1982), Cape Verdean long-distance runner
- Fagundes Varela (1841–1875), Brazilian poet
- Federico Varela (born 1996), Argentine footballer
- Felipe Varela, Spanish fashion designer
- Félix Varela (1788–1853), Cuban and United States venerated Catholic priest
- Fernando Varela (disambiguation), several people
- Florencio Varela (writer) (1808–1848), Argentine writer, poet, journalist and educator
- Francisco Varela (disambiguation), several people
- Froilán Varela (1891–1948), Uruguayan actor
- Gerardo Varela (born 1963), Chilean lawyer and politician
- Gilson Varela (born 1990), Cape Verdean footballer
- Guillermo Varela (born 1993), Uruguayan footballer
- Gustavo Varela (born 1978), Uruguayan footballer
- Gustavo Varela (footballer, born 2005), Portuguese footballer
- Héctor Varela (disambiguation), several people
- Hugo Varela (born 1992), Spanish squash player
- Iris Varela (born 1969), Venezuelan lawyer and politician
- Jairo Varela (1949–2012), Colombian musician in Grupo Niche
- Javier Varela (born 1940), Mexican field hockey player
- Jazmín Beccar Varela (born 1986), Argentinian actress
- Jesus Varela (1927–2018), Filipino Catholic bishop
- Jhonata Varela (born 2000), Brazilian footballer
- João Varela (disambiguation), several people
- Joaquín Varela (disambiguation), several people
- John Varela (born 1987), Colombian footballer
- Jorge Varela (disambiguation), several people
- José Varela (disambiguation), several people
- Juan Carlos Varela (born 1963), President of Panama
- Julia Varela (born 1981), Spanish radio and television journalist
- Keyan Varela (born 2006), Portuguese footballer
- Leonor Varela (born 1972), Chilean actress
- Lorenzo Varela (1917–1978), Spanish poet
- Luciano Varela, Spanish judge
- Lucky Varela (1935–2017), American politician
- Luis Varela (disambiguation), several people
- Manuel Varela (disambiguation), several people
- Mariana Varela (born 1996), Miss Universe Argentina 2019 and Miss Grand Argentina 2020
- Maria Varela (born 1940), Mexican-American civil rights organizer and author
- Marquesa de Varela, Uruguayan media executive specialising in celebrity interviews
- Marta Varela (born 1943), Argentine composer, pianist, and teacher
- Matias Varela (born 1980), Swedish actor
- Mauro Varela (1941–2020), Spanish banker, lawyer and politician
- Migdia Chinea Varela, American actress
- Miguel Varela (c. 1940–2016), Filipino businessman and lawyer
- Nico Varela (born 1991), Uruguayan footballer
- Nilton Varela (born 2001), Portuguese footballer
- Obdulio Varela (1917–1996), Uruguayan footballer
- Omar Varela (1957–2022), Uruguayan actor, theatre director and playwright
- Pany Varela, full name Anilton César Varela da Silva (born 1989), futsal player
- Pedro Varela (1837–1906), president of Uruguay in 1868 and from 1875 to 1876
- Pedro Varela Geiss (born 1957), Spanish writer, bookseller and Holocaust denier
- Reinaldo Varela (born 1959), Brazilian four-wheeler motorcycle rider
- Rui Varela (born 1983), Portuguese footballer
- Severino Varela (1913–1995), Uruguayan footballer
- Silvestre Varela (born 1985), Portuguese footballer
- Sofía Varela (born 1998), Costa Rican footballer
- Tanza Varela (born 1991), Chilean actress and model
- Tilsia Varela (born 1994), Venezuelan chess player
- Tomás Varela (born 1948), Cuban hockey player
- Toni Varela (born 1986), Cape Verdean footballer
- Víctor Varela (born 1955), Swedish composer
- Vitalina Varela (actress) (born 1966), Cape Verdean actress
- Wilber Varela (1958–2008), Colombian drug lord
- Yan Bartelemí, full name Yan Bartelemí Varela (born 1980), Cuban boxer
- Yolanda Varela (1930–2009), Mexican actress

== See also ==
- Varelas (disambiguation)
