= Varelas =

Varelas may refer to:

== Surname ==
- Julia Antonia Vicioso Varelas, Dominican historian, preservationist, and former swimmer
- Maria Varelas, American science educator
- Nikos Varelas, musician from Greek ensemble Ex Silentio
- Sovet Varelas (1923–1997) Uzbekistani composer

== Other ==
- Varelas, a family of people with the surname Varela
- Varelas, officially San Martiño das Varelas, parish in the municipality of Mellid, in the province of A Coruña, Galicia, Spain
