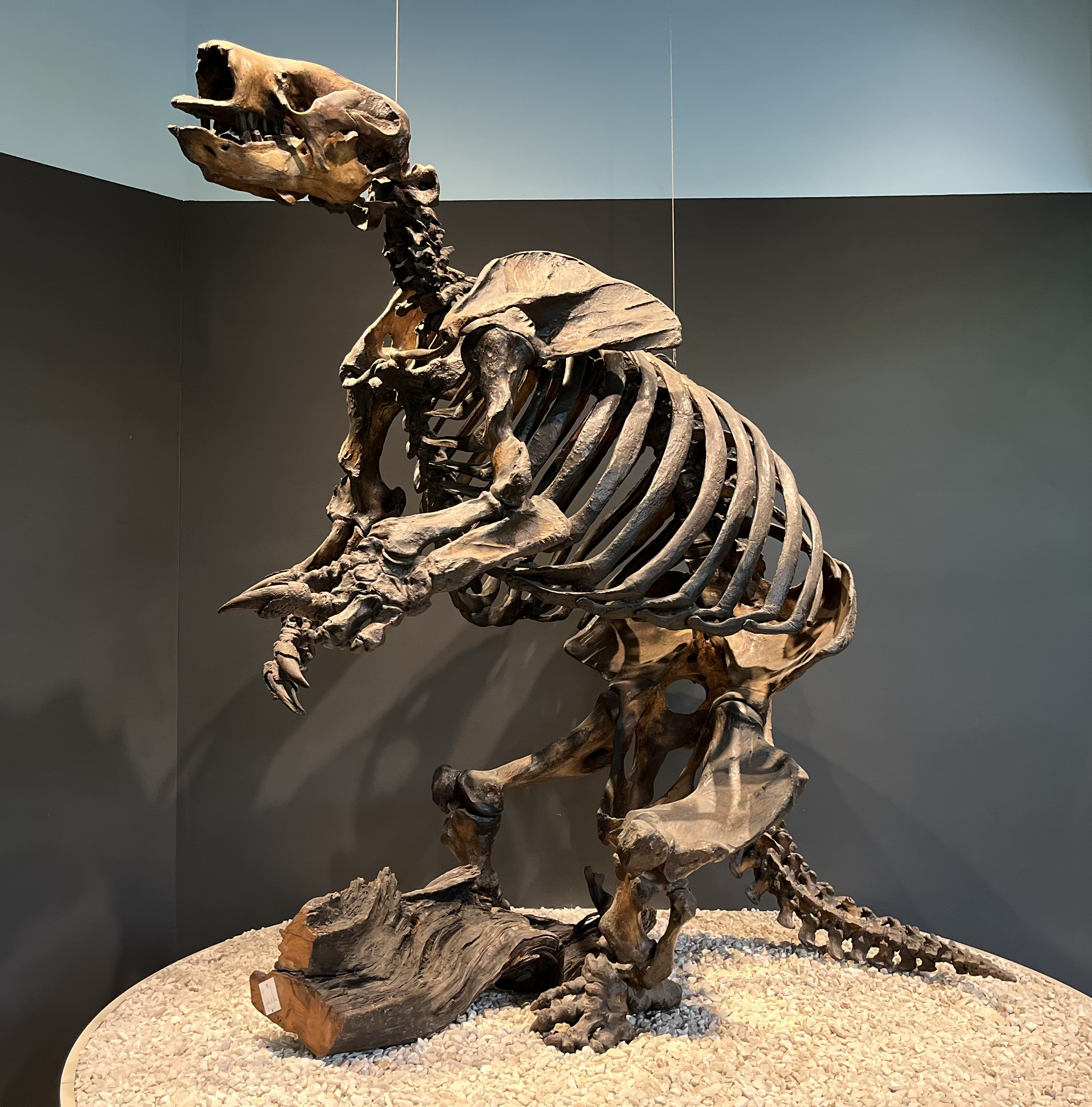
- Skeleton at the La Brea Tar Pits Museum

Scientific classification
- Kingdom: Animalia
- Phylum: Chordata
- Class: Mammalia
- Order: Pilosa
- Suborder: Folivora
- Family: †Mylodontidae
- Subfamily: †Mylodontinae
- Tribe: †Mylodontini
- Genus: †Paramylodon; Brown, 1903

Type species
- †Paramylodon harlani (Owen, 1840)

= Paramylodon =

Paramylodon Temporal range: ~4.9–0.012 Ma Early Pliocene - Late Pleistocene

Extinct genus of ground sloths from North America

Paramylodon is an extinct genus of ground sloth of the family Mylodontidae endemic to North America during the Pliocene through Pleistocene epochs, living from around ~4.9 Mya–12,000 years ago.

Within the genus only two species are recognised: Paramylodon harlani, also known as Harlan's ground sloth known from Early Pleistocene to the Late Pleistocene (Irvingtonian–Rancholabrean) and the earlier Pliocene–Early Pleistocene (Blancan) species Paramylodon garbanii, though the placement of the latter in the genus has been questioned by some authors. The first fossil findings date back to the beginning of the 1830s. They go back to Richard Harlan, in whose honor the species was named. The genus Paramylodon was introduced by Barnum Brown in the early 20th century. Over 150 years after the description of the first species, the finds that are now attributed to Paramylodon were repeatedly placed in with other genera, first with Mylodon, but since the 1950s increasingly with Glossotherium. Paramylodon shares numerous features that suggest a close relationship with Glossotherium. Only since the 1990s have both genera been considered distinct, with Glossotherium restricted to South America, while Paramylodon inhabited North America.

The species Paramylodon harlani is known from remains found across North America, with abundant remains known from the La Brea Tar Pits in California.

Like some other mylodontids, Paramylodon had osteoderms embedded within its skin. Paramylodon lived in open landscapes, sometimes also in mountainous locations, and were grazers or mixed feeders. Preserved footprints are known. The morphology of the forelimbs has led to suggestions that Paramylodon may have engaged in burrowing.

Like other ground sloths, Paramylodon became extinct around 14–12,000 years ago as part of the Late Pleistocene megafauna extinctions of most large mammals across the Americas. Paramylodon overlapped in time with Paleoindians, the earliest human inhabitants of the Americas, who may have hunted Paramylodon. Its extinction may be the result of climatic change, hunting, or a combination of both factors.

== Taxonomy ==
Paramylodon is an extinct genus of sloth from the extinct family Mylodontidae. Mylodontidae is grouped together with modern two-toed sloths of the family Choloepodidae and the extinct Scelidotheriidae, in the superfamily Mylodontoidea, with the former family being their closest living relatives.

Paramylodon is usually considered closely related to both Mylodon and Glossotherium. In contrast, a study presented in 2019 by Luciano Varela and other involved scientists, which includes numerous fossil forms of the entire sloth suborder, partially challenged this. In this study Paramylodon and Glossotherium were found to be closely related, Mylodon, on the other hand, forms the basis of the advanced mylodonts and Lestodon clades with some forms from northern South America. In the same year, a more-detailed phylogenetic analysis of the mylodonts was published by a research group led by Alberto Boscaini. According to the study, Paramylodon, Glossotherium, and Mylodon form a closer relationship within the Mylodontinae. This view also finds support from the aforementioned biochemical data, also presented in 2019. Detailed morphological analyses published as early as 2009 by Robert K. McAfee also suggest that Paramylodon and Glossotherium are very closely related and share a close common ancestor.

Below is a phylogenetic tree of the Mylodontidae, based on the work of Boscaini et al.. 2019, showing the position of Paramylodon.

- Mylodontidae
  - - Urumacotherium
    - Pseudoprepotherium
  - - - Paroctodontotherium
      - Octodontotherium
    - - Brievabradys
      - Mylodontinae
        - Lestodontini
          - - Lestodon
            - Bolivartherium
          - - Thinobadistes
            - - Sphenotherus
              - Lestobradys
        - Mylodontini
          - Pleurolestodon
          - - - Glossotheridium
              - Simomylodon
            - - - - Kiyumylodon
                  - Mylodon
                - Paramylodon
              - Glossotherium

=== Discoveries in North and South America ===
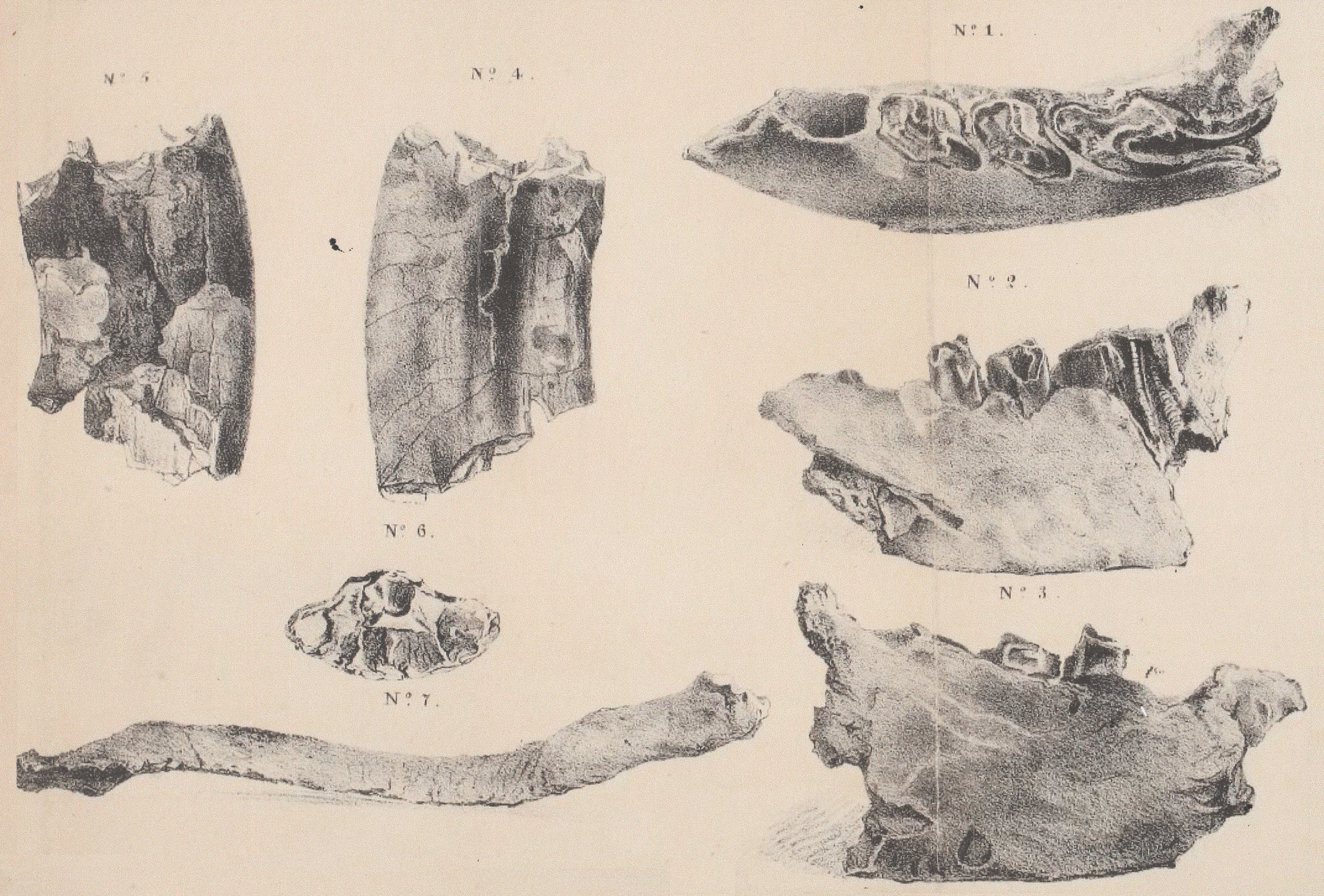
The first fossil finds of Paramylodon published by Richard Harlan in 1831

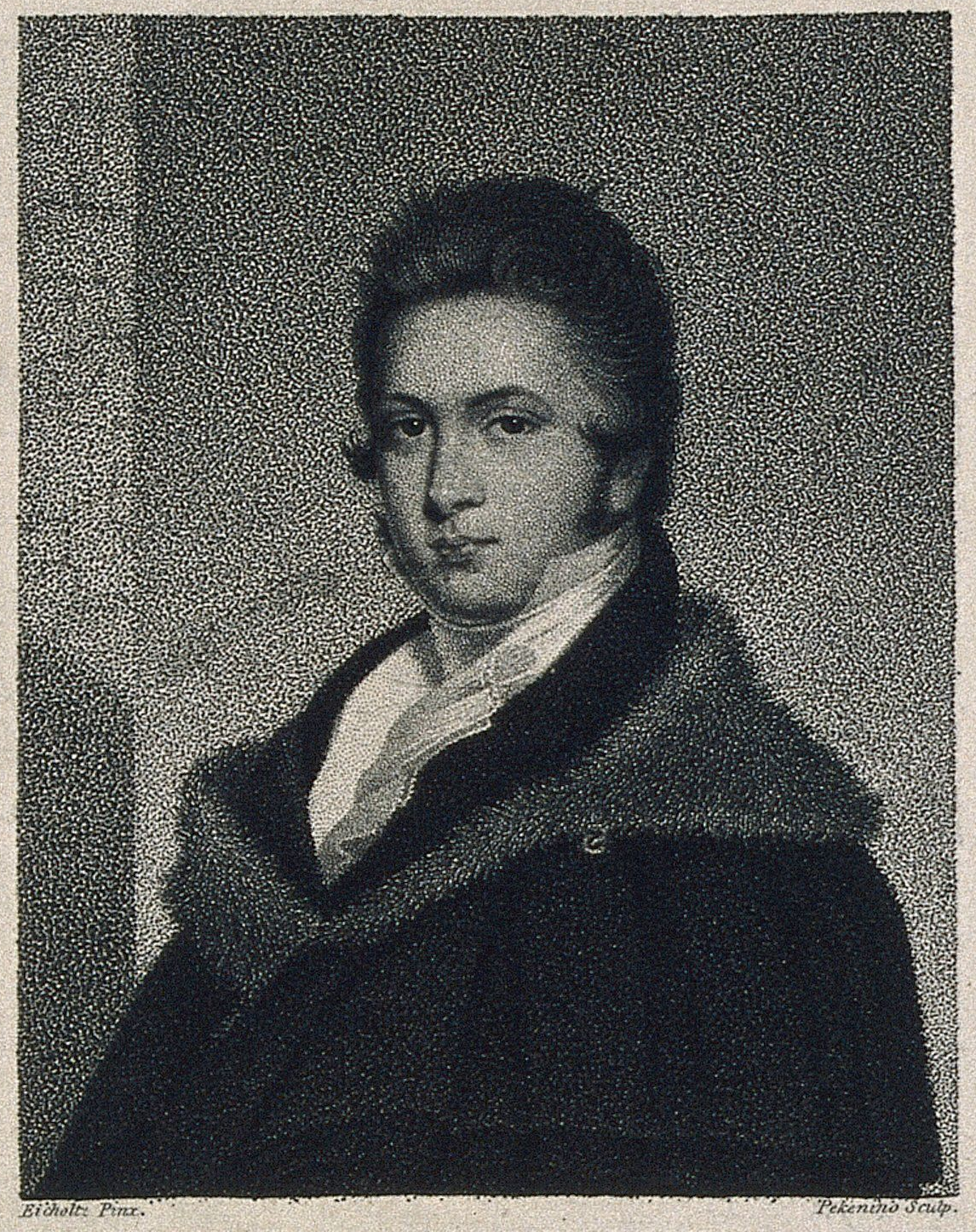
Richard Harlan

The research history of Paramylodon is complex and characterized by more than 150 years of confusion with Mylodon and Glossotherium. The history begins with the first discoveries of Richard Harlan (1796–1843) at Big Bone Lick in Boone County in the U.S. state of Kentucky in 1831, which included a right mandible and a clavicle. Harlan recognized that they were remains of an extinct sloth and referred them to Megalonyx, which was already known from North America at the time, and within the genus to the species Megalonyx laqueatus that he had established shortly before. The finds were originally preserved in New York, but are now lost.

Between the years 1831 and 1836, Charles Darwin made his pioneering voyage on HMS Beagle to South America and brought back from there a large number of fossils. These were then studied by Richard Owen, one of the most important explorers of the Victorian era, and the results published. In a first publication on mammalian remains in general in 1840, he introduced the genus Mylodon with the species Mylodon darwinii. The genus and species were based on a mandible Darwin found in Punta Alta in the Argentina Buenos Aires province. As a special characteristic, a total of four molar-like teeth per tooth row stood out. At the same time, Owen also noted similarities in tooth structure between Harlan's mandible and that of Mylodon darwinii. Inferring this, he discarded the name coined by Harlan, Megalonyx laqueatus, and created a new species, Mylodon harlani. The genus name Paramylodon is composed of the Greek παρα (para meaning "beside" or "near"), μύλη (myle "molar") and ὀδούς (odoús "tooth"), thus translates as "molar tooth". Harlan commented two years later on the use of the name because, in his opinion, it did not describe any outstanding characteristic of the animal and could mean any extinct mammal because almost all of them had the posterior molars.

In the same year, 1842, Owen presented a comprehensive description of a skeleton of a mylodont that came from the flood plains of the Río de la Plata north of Buenos Aires; he established for it the new species Mylodon robustus. At this point, then, the genus Mylodon consisted of three species, two of which occurred in South America and one in North America. Furthermore, it should prove problematic that Owen identified Mylodon darwinii as the type species of the genus, although, as he admitted, this was the second known and described species after Mylodon harlani. Accordingly, Mylodon harlani would actually be entitled to the status of type species. Subsequently, different type species were assigned to Mylodon, for example, Johannes Theodor Reinhardt in 1879 considered it to be Mylodon robustus, Richard Lydekker in 1887, on the other hand, considered it to be Mylodon harlani.

=== Paramylodon and the Mylodon–Glossotherium problem ===
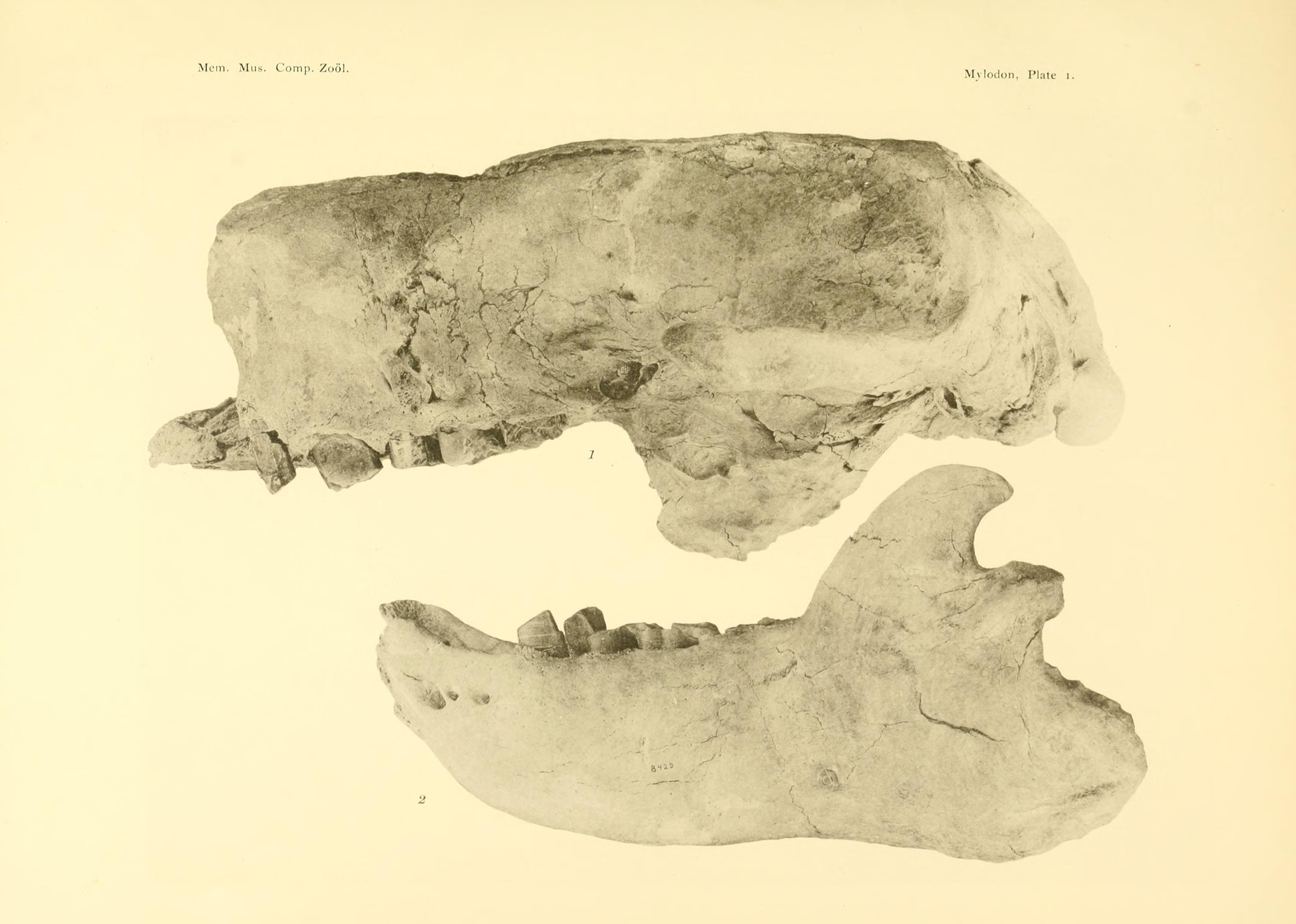
Skull of Mylodon garmani, a synonym of Paramylodon harlani

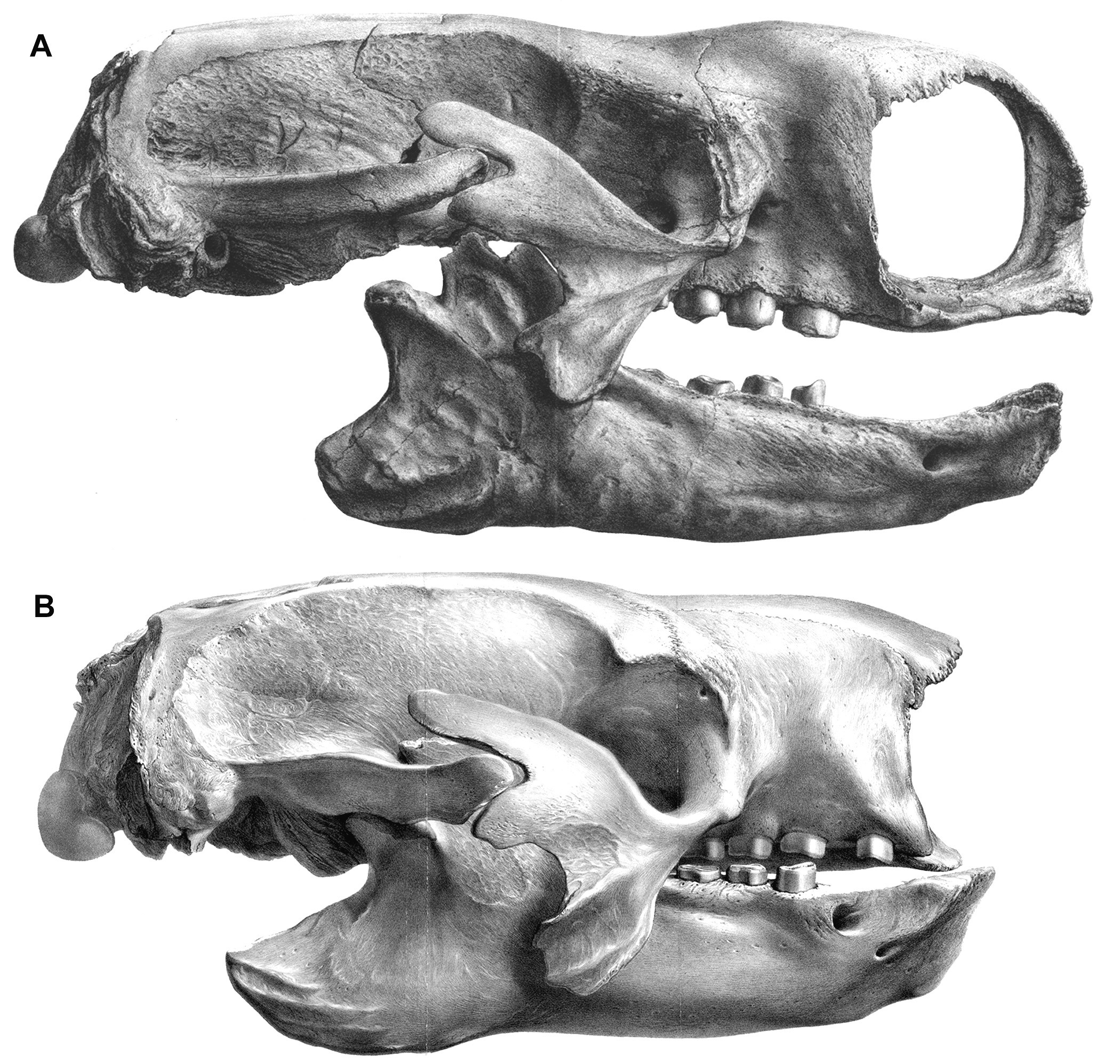
Skulls of Mylodon (top) and Glossotherium (bottom)

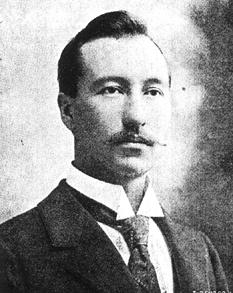
Barnum Brown

Within the genus Paramylodon, only one species, P. harlani, is recognized. Another species, P. nebrascensis, was described in 1903 by Barnum Brown on the basis of a partial skeleton from Hay Spring in Nebraska, but was already synonymised with the type species in the 1920s. Only ten years later, Glover Morrill Allen created the species Mylodon garmani with the help of another partial skeleton from the Niobrara River in Nebraska, but this is also considered a synonym of Paramylodon harlani. The same applies to several species named by Edward Drinker Cope as early as the 1870s and 1890s, such as Mylodon sodalis and Mylodon sulcidens. The original subdivision into two subspecies, P. h. harlani for a robust and P. h. tenuiceps for a gracile form, as suggested by Chester Stock in 1917, is no longer advocated today. However, the species "Glossotherium" chapadmalense is problematic. The species was originally identified in 1925 by Lucas Kraglievich from a 39 cm long, nearly undamaged skull with mandible from Middle Pliocene strata east of Miramar in the Argentina Buenos Aires province. It shows similarities to Glossotherium robustum, but also possesses individual divergences that may justify its own generic status; for example, the name "Eumylodon" (which Kraglievich already used for Eumylodon chapadmalense in 1925) has been suggested. The form could thus be the common ancestor of Glossotherium and Paramylodon. However, whether this also applies to the North American finds from the Pliocene of Florida and Mexico, first listed under the same species name by Jesse S. Robertson in 1976, or these are closer to Paramylodon is currently unclear due to lack of comparative studies. Partially, the early mylodont remains are also listed as P. garbanii, a species name given in 1986 to some Pliocene mandible and limb remains from Arroyo EI Tanque in the Mexican State of Guanajuato had been coined (under the scientific name Glossotherium garbanii). The species is not fully recognized, however, and other authors consider it a synonym of Glossotheridium/Glossotherium chapadmalense.

In 1903, Barnum Brown (1873–1963) introduced the generic name Paramylodon. He used for this purpose a partial skeleton from Hay Spring in Nebraska that had been discovered in 1897 during an expedition of the American Museum of Natural History. To the genus he assigned Paramylodon nebrascensis as a species. As defining differences from the North American Mylodon harlani, which Brown considered the type species of Mylodon, he gave the missing anterior caniniform teeth in the upper jaw. Thus, at that time, two distinct representatives of Mylodonts were recognized in the Pleistocene of North America.

Later, Chester Stock (1892–1950), based on his studies of the Rancho La Brea find material, pointed out that the feature of missing upper front teeth is highly variably developed in Mylodon harlani. Therefore, synonymized he replaced P. nebrascensis with Mylodon harlani in 1917. In 1928, however, Lucas Kraglievich restricted North American finds to Paramylodon and thus separated the genus from its South American representatives, an opinion that was echoed eight years later by Ángel Cabrera but it found little resonance among most researchers in the following period. Kraglievich, in the same move, also revised Glossotherium as an independent genus to be distinguished from Mylodon. Glossotherium had also originally been placed by Owen in his 1840 paper on Darwin's discoveries on the basis of a skull fragment from Arroyo Sarandí in southwestern present-day Uruguay, but only two years later he united it with Mylodon.

Subsequently, after Kraglievich and Cabrera, Glossotherium evolved into a "wastebasket" taxon on the basis of naming priority, into which numerous closely related forms were placed. George Gaylord Simpson expressed in his 1945 general taxonomy of mammals that if Paramylodon could not be clearly separated from Glossotherium, Glossotherium would be preferable due to having priority over Paramylodon. With the subsequent full inclusion of Paramylodon into the genus, accomplished by Robert Hoffstetter in 1952, Glossotherium was among the few sloth forms that occurred in South and North America, but it also possessed high variability as a result. Numerous researchers during the 20th century favored the view of the synonymy of the two sloth genera. In 1995, however, H. Gregory McDonald again separated the North American Paramylodon from the South American Glossotherium. In doing so, he noted that there have been no studies to date that have demonstrated that the two genera are actually synonymous. In fact, the presence of Paramylodon in North America would rather distinguish it from Glossotherium, which is, in turn, only known from South America. In the following time several skull studies could be presented, which clearly distinguished the two genera and plus Mylodon from each other. Some recent studies have questioned the attribution of the species P. garbanii to the genus.

== Description ==
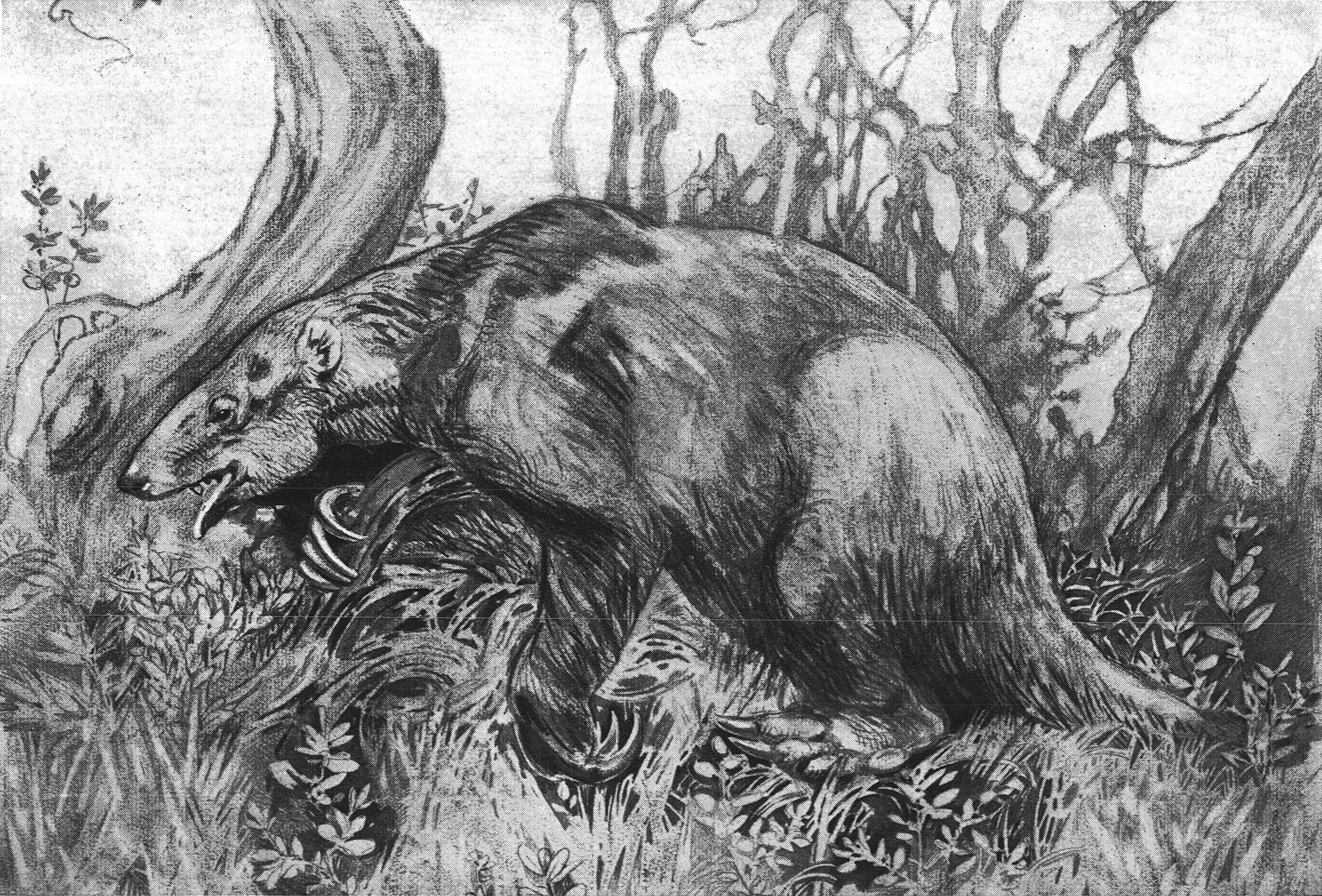
Restoration by M. Elie Cheverlange, 1931

Paramylodon measured about 3 metres (9.8 ft) in length with a shoulder height of 1.8 meters and weighed as much as 1.5 metric tons. It is known from North America deposits, including in Mexico and the United States and as far south as Guatemala. Paramylodon exhibits the characteristic of having had dermal ossicles, small bones embedded in the skin, presumably adding a degree of protection to the animal. This characteristic is also shared by the South American Mylodon.

Paramylodon is abundant in numbers primarily because of the finds from Rancho La Brea in California. The material recovered there from several dozen individuals served as the basis of numerous investigations, on which the following descriptive information is largely based on. This genus was a medium-sized representative of the Mylodontidae. A completely reconstructed skeleton from Rancho La Brea shows a total length of 279 cm, of which the tail occupies about 118 cm. At the shoulders it reaches a height of 112 cm, and at the pelvis it measures 122 cm. Paramylodon weighs about 1.39 tons, but earlier mylodontids were quite smaller. Overall, Paramylodon represented a robustly built animal. It was characterized by an elongate skull, a short neck, a short and compact body with a broad pelvis, and strong limbs and tail.

=== Skull and dentition characteristics ===
==== Skull characteristics ====
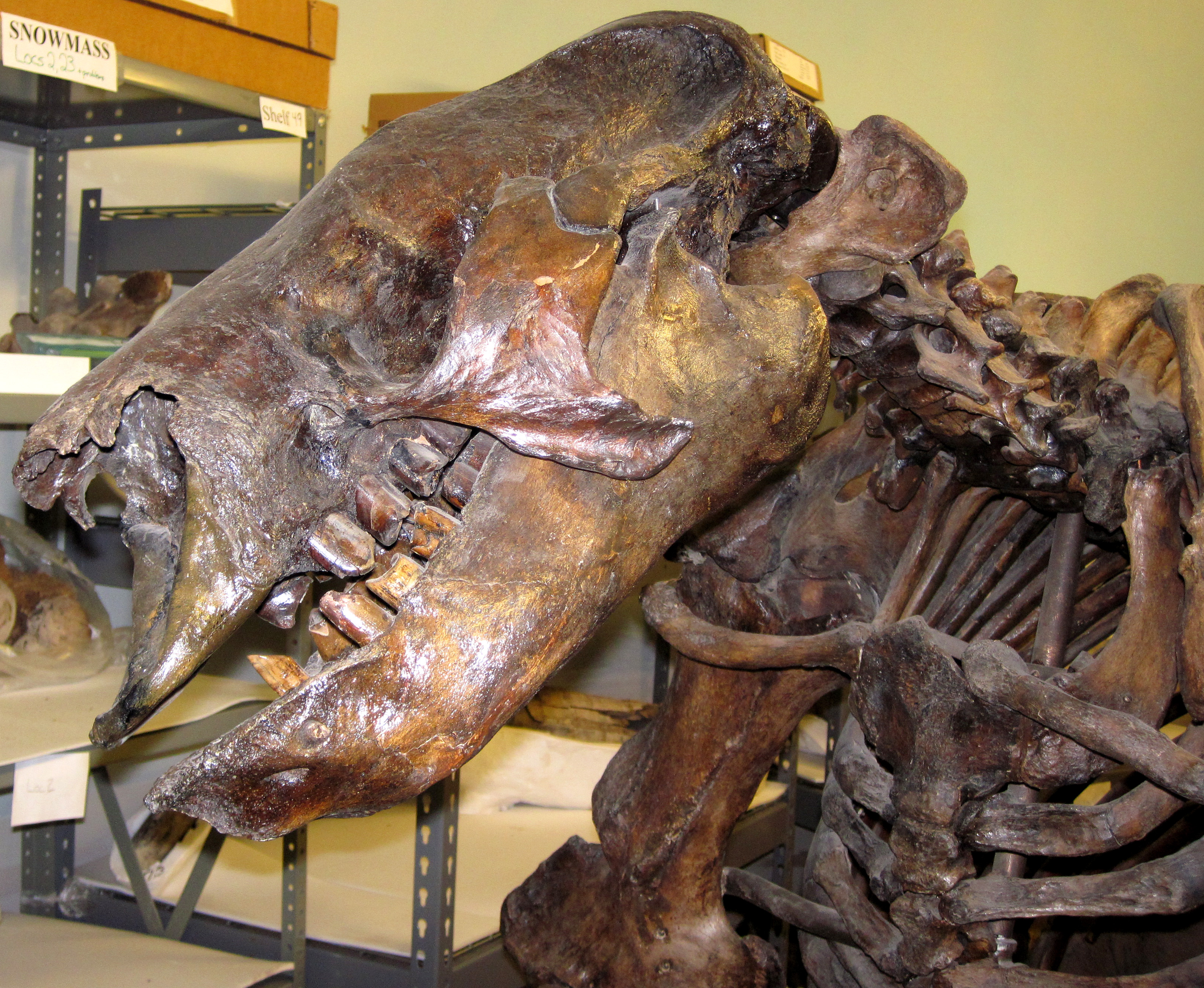
Skull of Paramylodon

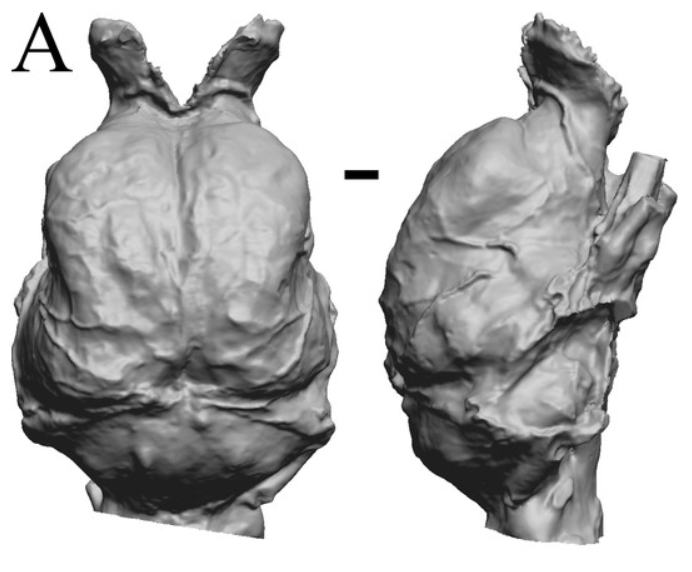
Digital endocast of the cranial cavity of Paramylodon (LACMHC 1717-33).

The skull of Paramylodon was long and narrow. It reached a typical total length of 42.9 to 49.8 cm (0.429 to 0.498 m). A particularly large skull measured 54.0 cm. In plain view, it possessed a rather rectangular shape with an average width at the occipital bone of 18.8 cm, behind the eyes of 12.2 cm, and at the snout of 14 cm. Typical for numerous mylodonts was the continuously widening snout towards the front. The skull, however, was shown to be altogether much narrower than in the comparably sized Glossotherium, the latter showing a dome-like bulge at the frontal line in side view, which did not occur in Paramylodon. However, the skull of Paramylodon, with the exception of the middle region (the dome-like bulge in Glossotherium), was on average higher, measuring about 13.8 cm at the occiput and 13 cm at the snout. The nasal bone was laterally in contact with the upper jaw. This created a nasal interior that was closed at the sides and open only at the front, becoming about as high as it was wide, which was due to the overall narrower skull. The diastema was, typical of sloths, only loosely connected to the upper jaw. At the frontal bone, the nasal bone protruded far back, so that the suture between the two skull bones was rather V-shaped. In addition, the frontal bone represented the largest bone of the entire skull. A strong parietal crest existed between the parietal bones, but it appeared much narrower than compared to Glossotherium. The zygomatic arches were secondarily closed again, deviating from most sloths. The anterior arch, originating at the zygomatic bone and pointing posteriorly, had three processes, one oriented upward, one downward, and the middle one horizontally. The posterior arch section, attached to the temporal bone, had a finger-like shape and joined the middle process of the anterior arch section. On the underside of the skull, the palatine bone protruded much further posteriorly in Paramylodon than in Glossotherium, caused by the longer extension of the bone behind the last molar. As in many mylodonts, both flanks of the wing bones were distinctly inflated. In Paramylodon, however, this was not quite as evident as in Glossotherium, so the distended structures were much further apart through the basal phenoid of the sphenoids. Features that link Glossotherium and Paramylodon include, for example, the dentition structure with the anterior caniniform teeth and the tooth structure, such as of the second molar, or the position of the bony suture between the palatine bone and the maxilla near the posteriormost tooth. In contrast, Mylodon is more distinctly divergent, with its reduced dentition, more simply designed teeth, and the forward bone junction between the palatine and maxilla.

==== Dental characteristics ====
The lower jaw reached lengths of 31.5 to 43.6 centimetres (12.4 to 17.2 in). It was massively built and broad. The horizontal bone body continuously increased in height from anterior to posterior, and below the posteriormost tooth its height was up to 10.5 cm. The robust symphysis grew up to 11 cm (4.3 in) and was typical for mylodonts. It extended forward, which is a characteristic of almost all sloths. This spoon-like extension of the symphysis did not project laterally as distinctly in Paramylodon as in Glossotherium, so that the lateral edges were rather straight and less distinctly curved than in the latter. The width of the symphysis in the anterior region was up to 15 cm. The articular process protruded only slightly above the masticatory plane, and the coronal process was much higher. Its anterior edge ran in a straight line in Paramylodon, deviating from the curved design in Glossotherium. The dentition consisted, as generally usual with the sloths, of 5 teeth per upper jaw half and 4 teeth per lower jaw half, thus altogether 18 teeth were formed. The front teeth had a canine-like (caniniform) shape, the others were molar-like (molariform). The dentition structure is considered phylogenetically primitive within the sloths. However, in later representatives of Paramylodon the upper caniniform teeth were often reduced, so that the dentition then consisted of only 16 teeth. A similar reduction of teeth is not known in Glossotherium. In Mylodon, on the other hand, the anteriormost teeth in the upper dentition were also no longer developed, but the lower caniniform teeth resembled the posterior molars. The caniniform teeth possessed an oval cross-section in Paramylodon and were curved backward. However, they did not reach the size as in Glossotherium or even in Lestodon. A short diastema existed to the posterior row of teeth. The molar-like molars had a flat shape with a somewhat raised margin. They possessed a bilobed shape in outline with strong median constriction, except for the first maxillary molar, which was more rectangular in shape and formed the longest tooth in the maxilla with an average length of 3.7 cm (1.5 in) In the second maxillary molar, the lobe-like structure was much more prominent than in Glossotherium. All teeth typically lacked enamel, instead consisting of a harder variant of dentin (orthodentin), with an additional outer layer of dental cement. The proportion of orthodentine reached 28% in Paramylodon. The upper row of teeth averaged 14.4 cm in length, of which the posterior molars occupied 12.6 cm. Due to the forward widening snout, the tooth rows diverged from each other.

=== Skeletal characteristics ===
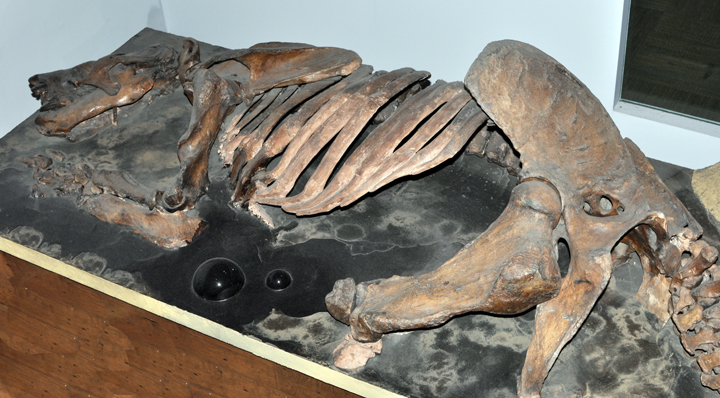
Skeletal remains of Paramylodon

The extensive find material from Rancho La Brea allows a comprehensive reconstruction of the body skeleton. The spine was composed of 7 cervical, 16 thoracic 8 to 9 lumbar, sacral, and 21 caudal vertebrae. The humerus was massive, the length was 46 cm, and the head did not stand out particularly clearly. A prominent bony ridge (deltopectoral groin) attached to the humeral shaft, but was less prominently developed in the upper part than in Glossotherium. The lower end of the joint protruded widely laterally. An entepicondylar foramen, which occasionally occurred in some sloths, was not developed here. The ulna possessed a greatly expanded superior articular process, the olecranon. It grew to about 20 cm in length, the entire bone reaching 40 cm in length. The construction of the ulna appeared shorter and more robust than in Glossotherium, the shaft was broad and narrowed above anteriorly and posteriorly. Likewise, the radius was short and massive with a length of 29.6 cm. The longest bone was represented by the femur at around 54.6 cm. Very short specimens from Rancho La Brea measured only 51 cm, very long 58 cm. The flat and broad design typical of ground sloths was striking, so that the bone appeared almost board-like. The head rose only slightly from the surface and had a more inward position. The shaft was slightly turned inward, and a third trochanter as a muscle attachment point, which appeared in Lestodon, was not visible in Paramylodon. With a length of 24.6 cm, the tibia was significantly shorter than the femur. This is a typical feature of mylodonts, in whose predominantly late representatives the lower section of the hind leg often reached only about half the length of the upper. In the case of Paramylodon, the tibia had 45% of the femur length. Its shaft was flattened like that of the femur and likewise exhibited a slight twist. The upper end of the joint was laterally projecting, the width here reaching about three-quarters of the length of the total bone. The fibula was not fused to the tibia, reaching 26.3 cm in length.

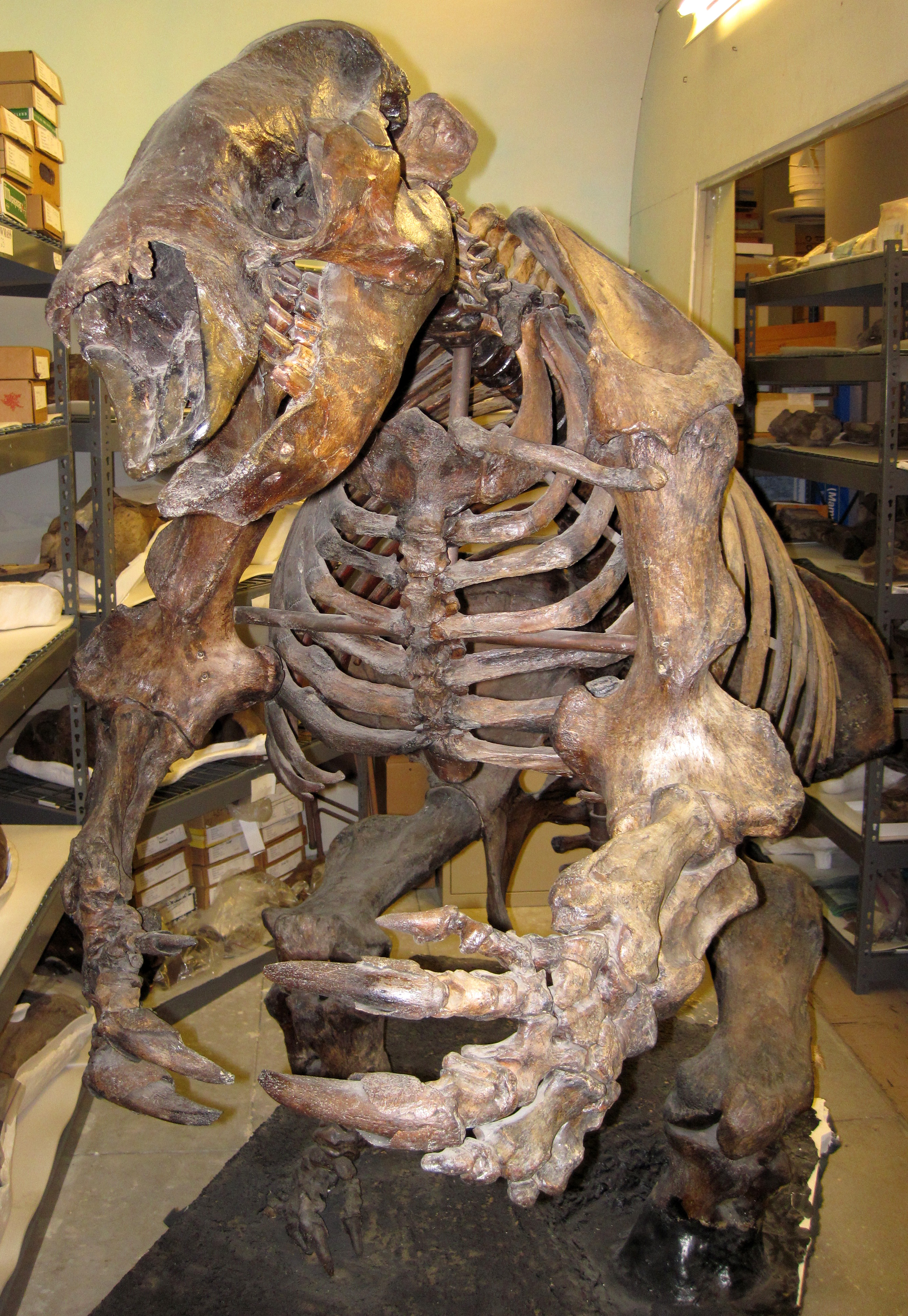
Skeleton of Paramylodon with hands visible

Hands and feet showed a similar structure as in the other large mylodonts Glossotherium and Lestodon, deviations are present in detail. The hand exhibited a total of five rays (I to V), with only the three inner rays (I to III) having developed claws. The metacarpal of the first ray was fused with the polygonal bone to form a single unit, which is frequently attested in ground-dwelling sloths (so-called metacarpal carpal complex or MCC). The metacarpal bones of the third to fifth rays were massive and over 10 cm long, with that of ray IV possessing the most robust construction. At the finger ray I the first two phalanges were additionally intergrown, at the rays II and III existed in each case three phalanges, of which the first two showed however clearly reduced lengths. The respective end members of the three inner rays had extended claw processes, which suggests correspondingly large claws. The length ranged from inner (I) to outer (III) from 7.5 cm to 15.4 cm to 17.4 cm, the height varied from 2.9 to 5.7 cm. The clawless outer fingers possessed phalanges greatly reduced in size. The foot of Paramylodon had a total of four rays (II to V), the innermost ray was completely reduced. Claws existed here only on toes II and III, which were also the most strongly developed. However, the metatarsals here had rather short lengths of 3.6 and 6.5 cm, respectively, at the outer rays they became over 11.0 cm long each and were very massive. As in the other two mylodonts, the second ray had only two phalanges, as the first and second phalanx were fused into one unit corresponding to the hand. Deviating from Glossotherium and Lestodon, the third ray of Paramylodon also often consisted of only two limbs. The respective end phalanges with claws showed analogous to the hand an extremely strong construction, alone the claw process measured here about 8.5 cm at the second and 11.1 cm at the third ray and became in each case 3.3 and 3.9 cm high. The outer rays possessed opposite to this again strongly reduced terminal members.

=== Osteoderms ===
The mylodonts are the only known lineage of sloths whose representatives had bony platelets, so-called osteoderms, formed in the skin, analogous to today's armadillos. Unlike the latter, however, they did not form a solid bony armor in mylodonts, but were rather loosely scattered, as shown by finds of skin remains of Mylodon. Several hundred osteoderms of Paramylodon are known from Rancho La Brea, in addition, among others, also as a dense layer on a slab from Anza-Borrego State Park in California and from Haile 15A, a fossil-rich limestone fissure in Florida. The bone platelets were round to oval, sometimes irregularly shaped, and 5 to 30 mm long. They exhibited a rough surface with irregular depressions, whereas the underside was smooth and convex in design. In cross-section, they possessed a compact structure consisting of numerous fiber bundles mixed with hard bone lamellae (osteomae). In principle, the bone platelets of mylodonts were simpler in structure than those of other xenarthrans.

== Distribution and important fossil finds ==
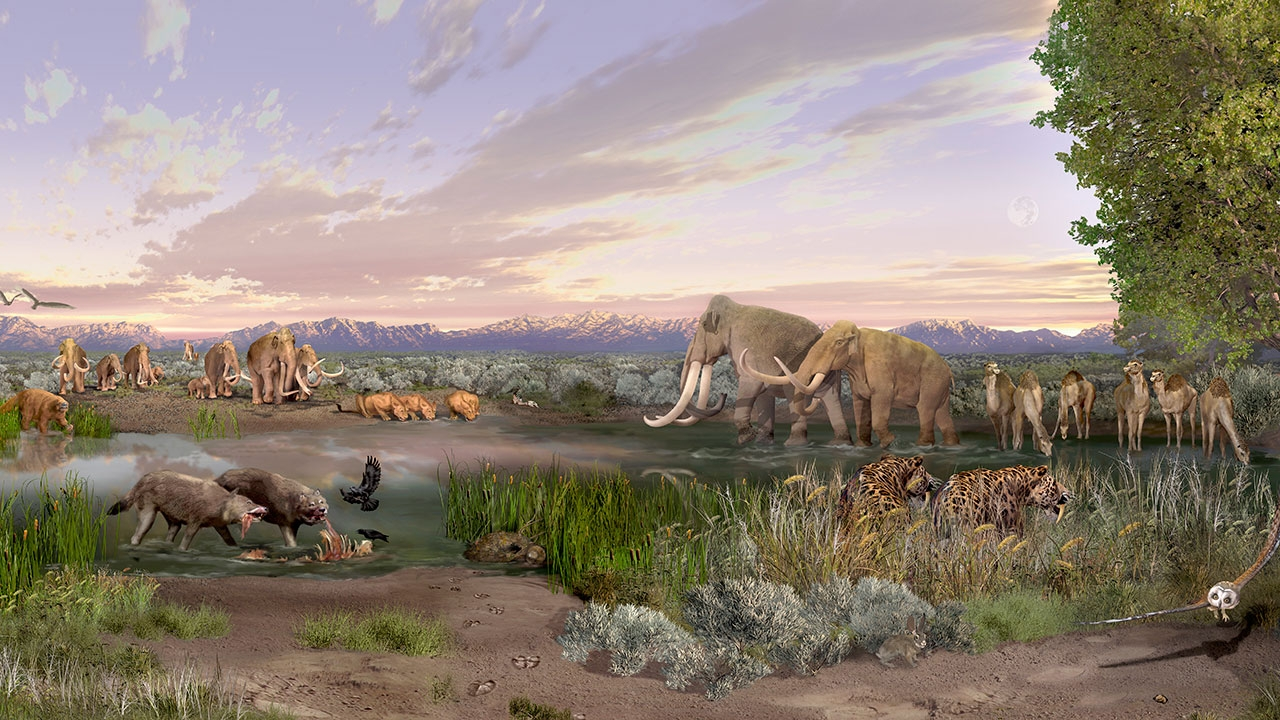
Environment of what is now White Sands National Park, with Paramylodon drinking in the left background

Sites and specimen ages (not complete):

- El Golfo de Santa Clara Site, Sonora, Mexico ~4.9—1.8 Mya.
- Tri-Britton Site, Hendry County, Florida ~2.1 Mya.—700,000 years ago.
- Turin Pit Site (or Elliott Pit) Monona County, Iowa ~1.8—300,000 years ago.
- Port Kennedy Cave Site, Montgomery County, Pennsylvania ~1.8 Mya.—300,000 years ago.
- Fairmead Landfill Site, Madera County, California ~1.8 Mya.—300,000 years ago.
- Rio de la Pasion Site, Petén, Guatemala ~100,000—11,000 years ago.
- Fanno Creek Site, Tualatin, Oregon~15,000—10,000 years ago.
- Medicine Hat Unit V Site, Alberta, Canada ~1.8 Ma—11,000 years ago.

=== Overview and early occurrences ===
Paramylodon was endemic distributed in North America and possibly also in Central America. The oldest finds clearly assignable to the genus are known from the Lower Pleistocene. Older forms of mylodonts are from the Upper Pliocene of Mexico and from the US state of Florida. Of the latter, noteworthy is the partial skeleton from site Haile 15A, a crevice filled with sediments in the limestone in Alachua County, estimated to be 2.1 to 1.8 million years old. These early representatives are commonly referred to as "Glossotherium" chapadmalensis, although the position within the genus Glossotherium is disputed. Only slightly younger are the finds of the fossil-rich El Gulfo local fauna from the estuary of the Colorado River in the Mexican state of Sonora. They are already placed in Paramylodon and date to 1.8 to 1.6 million years ago. Overall, Lower and Middle Pleistocene fossil remains are relatively rare and come from about 20 localities in North America. These are distributed primarily in the southern and central areas of what is now the United States and northern Mexico, but also scatter in the western part of the continent as far north as the province of Alberta in Canada. They are found in both lowland and mountainous locations, with the highest finding point reaching about 2900 m elevation in Colorado. One of the most significant sites of the period is the Leisey Shell pit in Hillsborough County in Florida, where several skulls and postcranial skeletal elements have been reported to be about 1.2 million years old.

=== Late Pleistocene remains ===
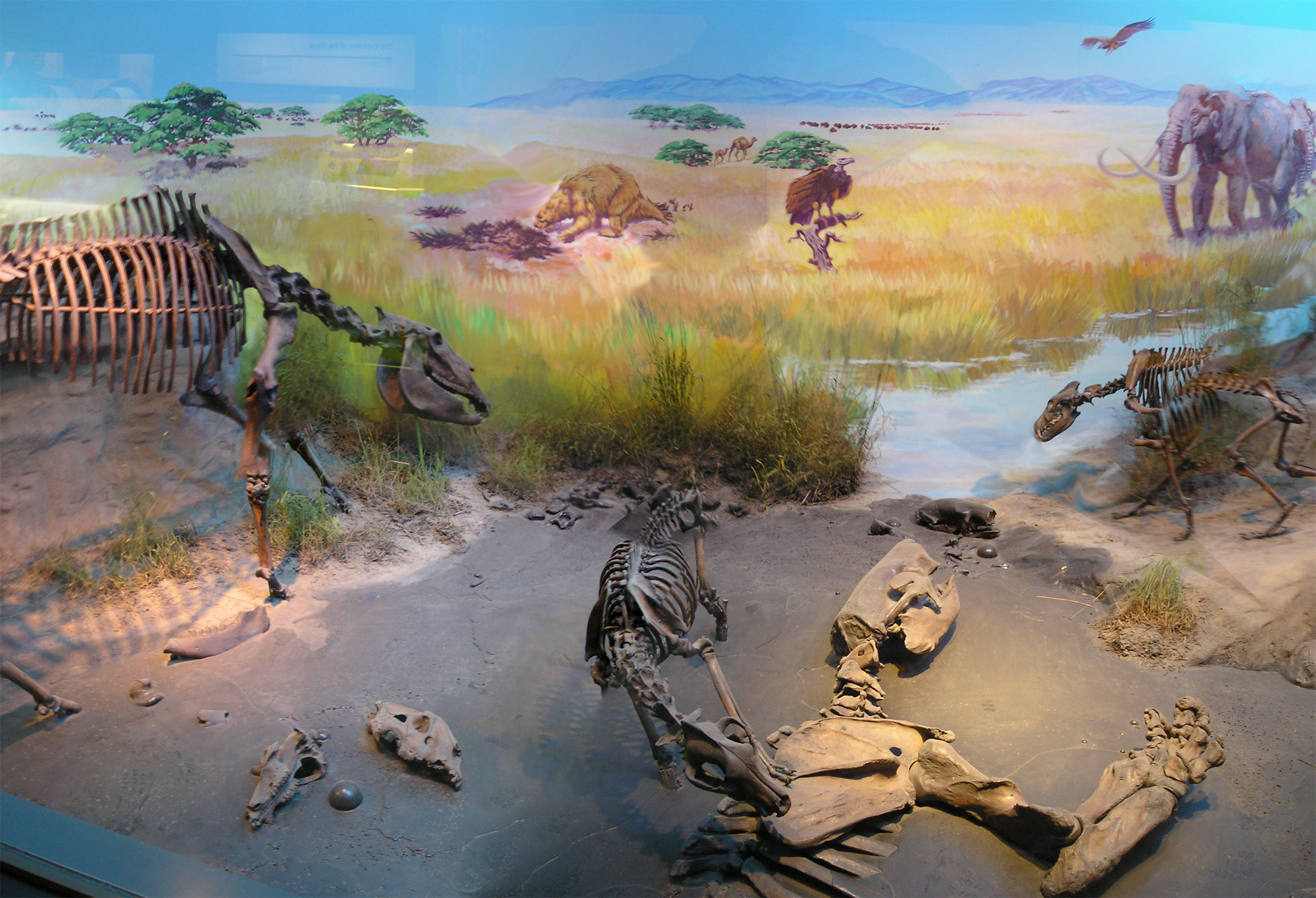
A panorama of Rancho La Brea, in the foreground a skeleton of Paramylodon, at the Royal Ontario Museum, Toronto

The find material of the Upper Pleistocene is much more extensive, coming from more than 100 localities, in California alone Paramylodon is known from more than 60 localities. The distribution of the genus is similar to the Lower Pleistocene, but in addition it occurs somewhat further east in the Midwest, such as in Iowa. The northernmost find of the genus is at Sequim in Washington state at 48.1° north latitude; to the south, the genus is also known from across Mexico. Some finds now indicate that Paramylodon may also have lived in Guatemala and El Salvador. Among others, finds of a juvenile and an adult individual were recovered from Stevenson Bridge in stream deposits of Putah Creek in Yolo County of California, dating to the beginning of the Last Glacial Period. Two nearly complete skeletons have been reported from Shonto and Richville in Arizona, among the few known finds from the state. In general, fossil remains of Paramylodon are very rare on the Colorado Plateau in the southwestern United States and additionally in northwestern Mexico, possibly related to the drier climate in this area at the time.

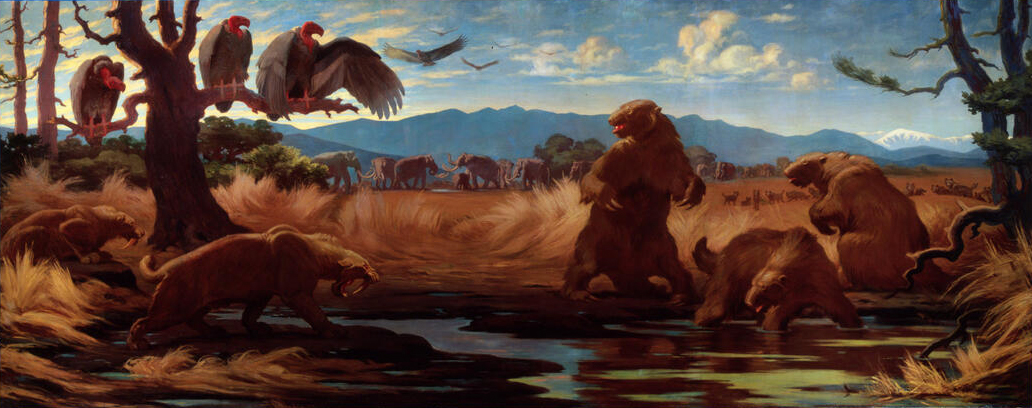
Smilodon fatalis pair approaching a group of Paramylodon, one mired, at the La Brea Tar Pits, by Charles R. Knight, 1921

Of outstanding global importance, however, are the finds from the tar pits of Rancho La Brea in southern California. From here comes an extensive fossil fauna ranging in age from 45,000 to 14,000 years before present. The first finds were discovered as early as the second half of the 19th century, but the far more significant material is due to focused scientific investigations in the early 20th century, including a total of over 100 documented sites. A striking feature of the faunal spectrum is the unusual dominance of predators over herbivores. Most likely, the predators were attracted in greater numbers by animals stuck in the asphalt and then fell victim to the natural traps themselves. Among the sloths, Paramylodon, Megalonyx, and Nothrotheriops are three of the four genera recorded in North America, with Eremotherium being known only from the eastern part of the United States. However, Paramylodon represents by far the most abundant ground sloth at La Brea with over 70 individuals, and 30 skulls alone are notable among the finds. Another very extensive fossil complex is present with the Diamond Valley Lake Local Fauna in Diamond Valley and Domenigoni Valley in Riverside County also in southern California. Material has been recovered during the construction of Diamond Valley Lake since the mid-1990s and currently includes more than 100,000 specimens from more than 100 taxa, from more than 2600 different localities. In contrast to Rancho La Brea, large herbivores dominate here, while the a proportion of large predators is low. Thus, an undisturbed character of the faunal community can be inferred. Paramylodon is documented with about 280 individual finds, which represents about 8% of the total mammalian fauna. The ground sloth thus forms the fifth most abundant representative of mammals in the Diamond Valley Lake Local Fauna after bison, horses, the mastodon Mammut pacificus, and the camel Camelops. In contrast, the two other sloths Megalonyx and Nothrotheriops that also occur in Rancho La Brea play are much less abundant, together accounting for 0.5% of the find record. The age of the Diamond Valley Lake Local Fauna corresponds to that of Rancho La Brea according to radiocarbon datings.

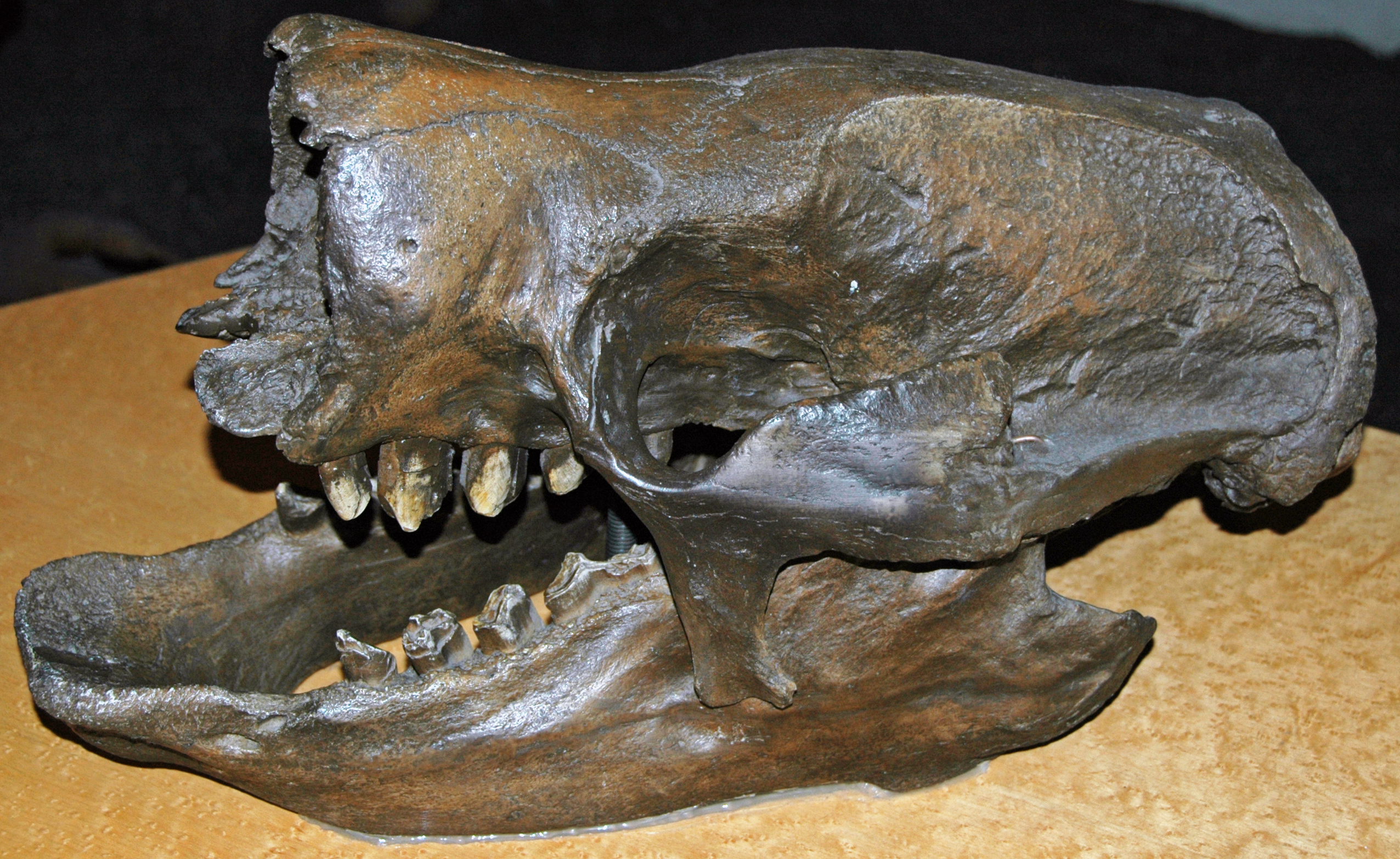
Skull

== Paleobiology ==
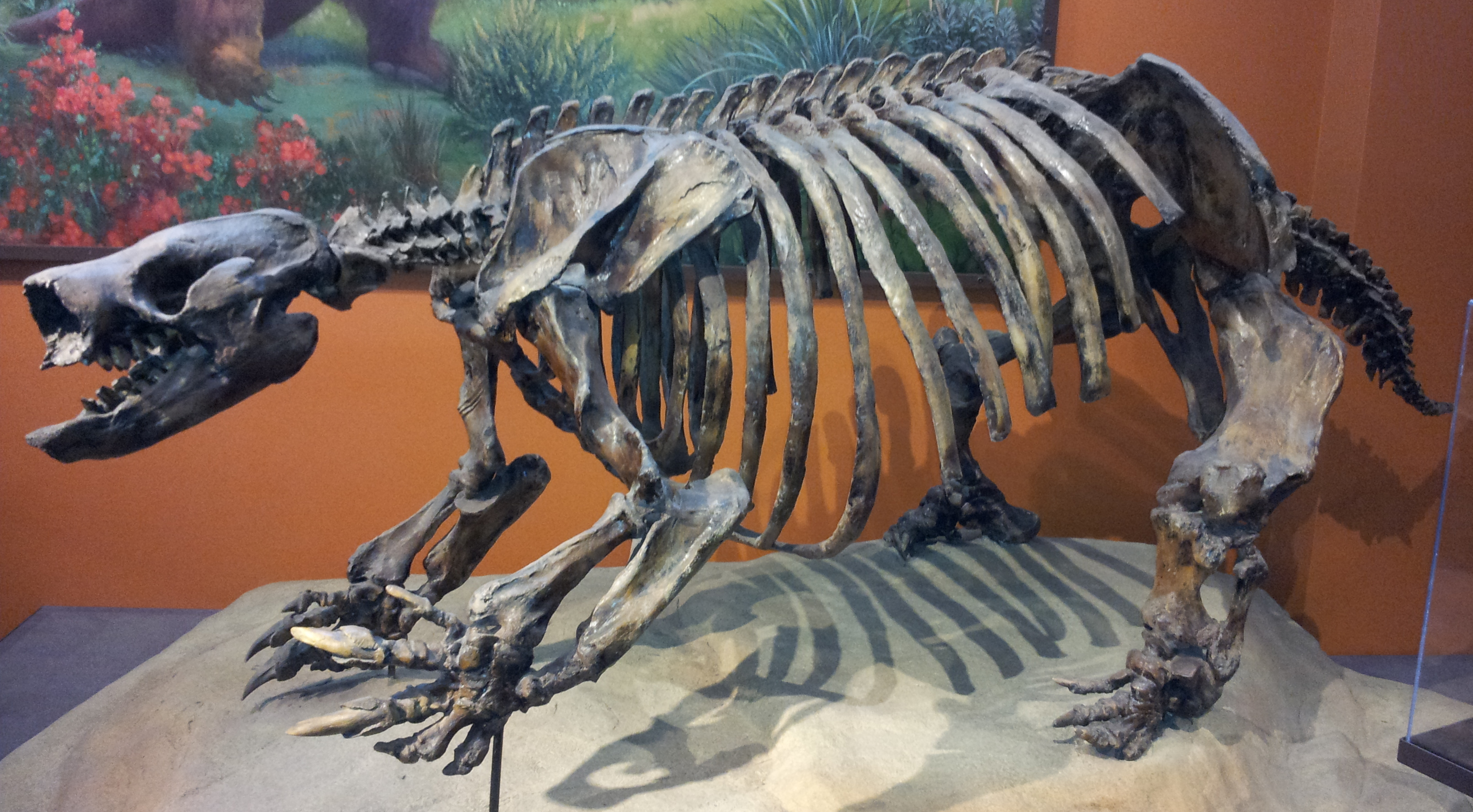
Skeleton in quadrupedal pose, San Diego Museum

=== Body size change and sexual dimorphism ===
Like numerous other animal groups, Paramylodon underwent a marked increase in body size in the course of its phylogeny. The weight of members of the Lower Pleistocene is given as about 915 kg, the late representatives from the Upper Pleistocene, however, probably reached up to 1.39 t body weight. Basis for the respective weight estimates are the femurs, whose corresponding lengths are 48.4 and 54.6 cm, respectively. The earliest forms from the Pliocene, whose position within the genus Paramylodon, however, is widely discussed, had a total weight of about 310 kg with a femur length of 35.5 cm. Taking these early representatives into account, the weight of Paramylodon increased by a factor of 4.5 over the course of a good 2.5 million years. It is particularly striking that especially in the late Pleistocene at the time of the Last Glacial Period with its extremely pronounced climatic fluctuations, there is hardly any variation in size, as studies of the numerous finds from Rancho La Brea dating from 45,000 to 10,000 years Before Present indicate. This is explained with a high flexibility of the genus in relation to the environment and thus a high adaptability. However, the assumption ignores the fact that increasingly cooler conditions should lead to an increase in body size according to the Bergmann's rule.

Based on the extensive fossil record from the late Pleistocene, two morphotypes can be distinguished in Paramylodon, a graceful variant and a robust variant. The morphotypes are not reflected in the general size of the skulls, but mainly concern their expression, for example in the width ratios. Also, differences can be found, for example, in the occipital bone, which is vertical in the robust variant, but oblique backward in the more graceful. Thus the joint surfaces for the attachment of the cervical spine are more prominently emphasized in the latter than in the former. Further deviations are found in the formation of the caniniform teeth which, if present, end pointedly in robust individuals, but bluntly in gracile ones. Possibly the two morphotypes are not species or taxonomic variations in the sense of subspecies, as it was originally assumed, because they often occur at one and the same locality. Rather, they are more an expression of intraspecific sexual dimorphism. However, it is currently impossible to assign a morphotype to a specific sex. In the 30 known skull finds from Rancho La Brea, the ratio of robust to gracile is 3:1; at the Americas Fall Reservoir in Idaho, with three skulls, the ratio is 2:1; and at Ingleside in Texas, also with three skulls, the ratio is 3:0. It is noteworthy here that sexual dimorphism is not reflected in the postcranial skeleton and thus, as noted earlier with the skull, no size dimorphism occurs in the form of significant length differences in limb bones. In contrast, Eremotherium, which was also common in North America at the same time but belongs to the Megatheriidae, is known to have a pronounced size difference between the sexes.

=== Locomotion ===
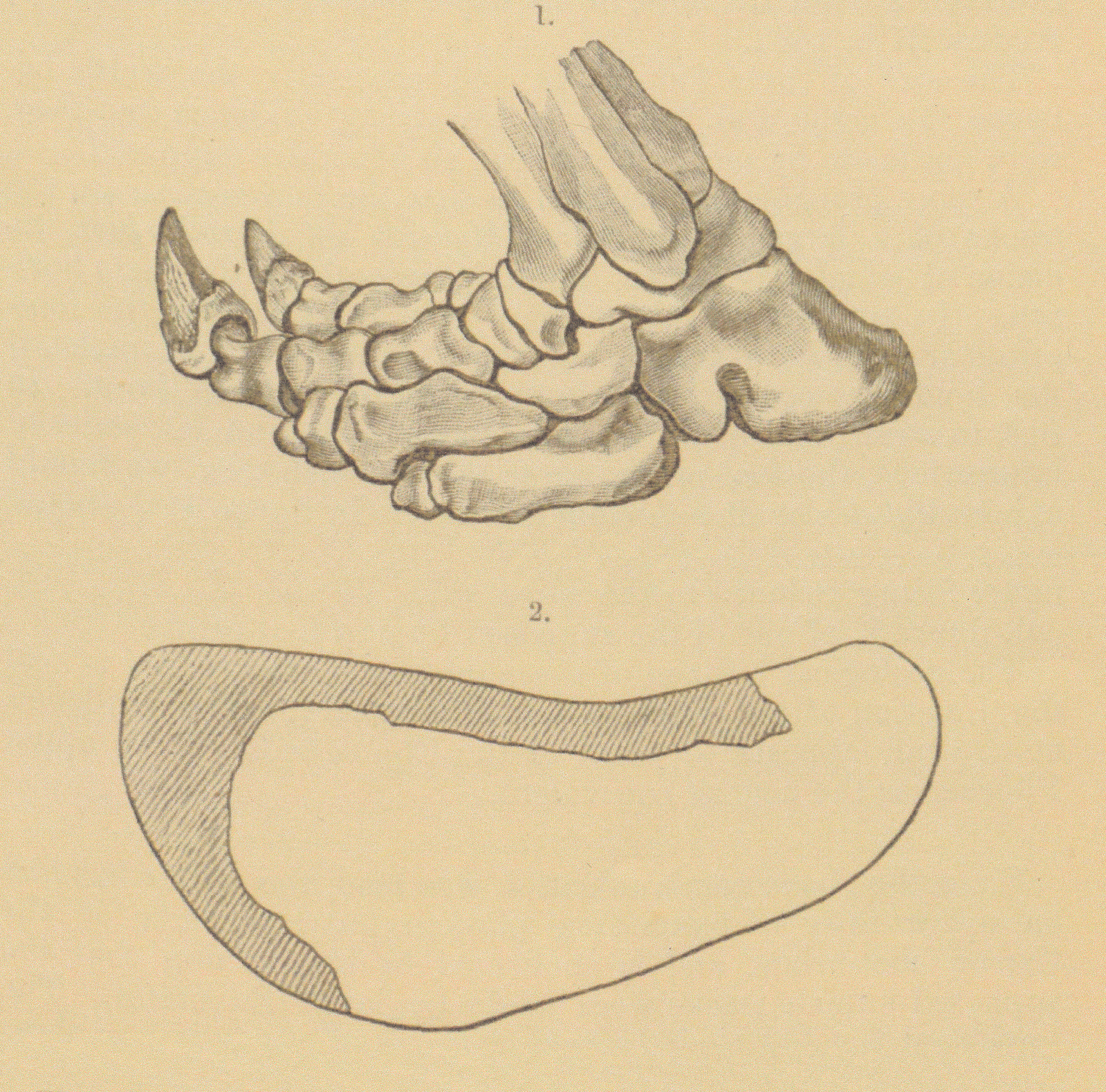
Footprint (bottom) and reconstructed foot skeleton (top) of Paramylodon.

In general, a quadrupedal locomotion is assumed for the ground-dwelling sloths. However, due to the body's center of gravity being shifted far to the rear, it was obviously also possible for them to change to a bipedal position, while being able to support themselves with the powerful – in contrast to today's tree sloths – very long tail. The hind foot of Paramylodon is turned inward, so that the main load when the foot is placed on the outer ray (V). This results in the pedolateral gait characteristic of numerous ground sloths, which required significant restructuring in the shape and bearing of the tarsal bones relative to each other, especially in the talus and calcaneus. In Paramylodon, the outer edge of the foot was little arched up, forming a more or less straight edge, and the calcaneus was in contact with the ground at nearly full length. This is consistent with other mylodonts, but differs greatly from the closely related Scelidotheriidae, which had a highly arched foot with only the posterior end of the calcaneus touching the ground. Another distinctive feature is found in the hind limbs. Here the locomotor system is characterized by an extremely short lower section. In Paramylodon the lower section reaches less than 50% of the upper. Such a construction plan, exhibited by nearly all mylodonts, suggests a rather slow and cumbersome locomotion. In comparison, the megatherians had significantly longer lower limb sections.

Trace fossils that provide evidence of ground sloth locomotion are rarely preserved. For Paramylodon, such definite stepping seals have been demonstrated at the Nevada State Prison near Carson City. The tracks were discovered as early as the second half of the 19th century during sandstone quarrying and initially, in 1882, were interpreted as evidence of giant humans. However, by the following year, Othniel Charles Marsh recognized a connection with extinct ground sloths and sought the originator of the stepping seals among the mylodonts, of which bone remains also exist from the same site. In total, numerous tracks of other mammals - such as mammoths, horses, moose, as well as predators – and additionally of birds have been discovered at Carson City in addition to Paramylodon. The stepping seals are distributed over an area of about 8000 m^{2}, they are today largely covered by the prison construction, but well documented by casts. A total of ten tracks could be observed from Paramylodon, consisting of 15 to 20 individual alternately impressed tracks. Each individual footprint is 47 to 51 cm long and about 20 cm wide, in outline they actually resemble human footprints, but they are much more laterally indented. Further studies showed that the shape of the prints corresponds very well with the shape of the foot of Paramylodon and that the outline reminiscent of humans is due to the outwardly turned foot of the sloth. The lateral distance between the tracks is about 60 cm, which roughly corresponds to the distance between the two hip sockets on the pelvis of Paramylodon, as does the stride length of about 146 cm, which in turn corresponds to the known hind leg length of 95 cm. Strikingly, thereby almost exclusively hind footprints have survived, which was initially also interpreted with a bipedal locomotion of the animals, analogous to corresponding trace fossils of Megatherium in South America. However, it was determined that the individual tread seals of the hind feet overlapped those of the forefeet. Because the anterior foot is much smaller than the posterior and sets on differently, it produces a much smaller impression. In individual cases, footprints have been preserved which show that the forefoot is covered by the hindfoot. For anatomical reasons, such as the bent legs when walking, the position and orientation of the hind foot to the leg, and similar, permanent bipedality of the large ground sloths is unlikely. The stride length of Paramylodon suggests an average speed of 1.8 to 2.2 m/s, which is similar to the determined speed of Megatherium.

Studies of the scapulae of both young and adult individuals show a significant change in shape, from a more rounded form in the former to a largely ovoid form in the latter. The ontogenetic overprinting are comparable to those of present-day arboreal sloths. The similarity of the shoulder blades of the young representatives of Paramylodon and the young of present-day sloths suggests comparable behaviors. Accordingly, the young of Paramylodon still had various climbing abilities and possibly clung to their mothers during transport.

=== Diet ===
==== Feeding habits ====
Mylodonts are generally considered to be grazers (graminivores) based on their high-crowned teeth with flat chewing surfaces, similar to those of modern grazers. However, the lack of enamel in the teeth of sloths makes comparisons difficult. The graminivorous diet was inferred based on the special tooth formation, analyses of the masticatory apparatus of Paramylodon showed that food was predominantly crushed in forward, backward, and lateral chewing movements, which is also indicated by corresponding grinding marks. This is not contradicted by the caniniform front teeth, which – if formed – are rather small. The mandibular joint is broadly developed in Paramylodon and has an unspecialized surface, the associated glenoid fossa on the skull appears shallow, which is typical of herbivores with their rotary chewing movements. However, an additional, nearly vertical articular facet occurs on the inner side, anchored in a depression on the outer wall of the wing bone. This tended to limit overly strong lateral masticatory movements. The arrangement of the Musculus masseter caused Paramylodon to open its mouth only 22°, which is considerably less than in two-toed sloths, which, however, have comparatively longer caniniform teeth. All in all, the structure of the masticatory apparatus rather suggests a preference for mixed plant diets.

==== Feeding behaviour ====
The construction of the snout, which is not quite as broad as in Lestodon, indicating a grass-based diet which is analogous to the living white rhinoceros, but significantly broader than in Eremotherium and Megatherium, which were both browsers, meaning that they ate the leaves of trees and bushes, which is comparable to that of the black rhinoceros, which is also a browser. The elongated symphysis of the mandible projects well beyond the nasal region. Since there is no ossification of the nasal septum as in Mylodon, a vigorous cartilage development must be assumed here. In addition, the tongue may also have had a supporting function during feeding. Due to the position of the hyoid bone, which was displaced far back in the skull, and its robust construction with strong muscle attachments, the geniohyoideus muscle, for example, was particularly strong and long, so that it could accommodate a very mobile tongue. Since no coprolites are known from Paramylodon in contrast to Mylodon, the food remains cannot be determined directly. In addition, due to the lack of enamel, detailed isotopic examinations are rarely possible. Therefore, performing such methods requires excellent fossil preservation; in the case of Paramylodon, it was accomplished on the dentary of several teeth from the Upper Pleistocene site of Ingleside, Texas. The results obtained from this using carbon isotopes fall between the ranges of present-day herbivores specializing in a hard grazing or soft browsing plant diet, thus advocating a mixed diet, but possibly with a stronger bias towards grasses. Thus, the results obtained so far are in good agreement with the open landscape in which Paramylodon lived. However, it is also hypothesized that the sloth representative may have been digging for roots. This is supported, for example, by the strong forelegs, which had a robust humerus widely projecting at the lower joint end, a short ulna with a long extended olecranon for massive forearm musculature, and somewhat flattened claws, making them very well suited for digging. In addition, differences in dentition between early and late members of the genus are apparent. For example, Lower Pleistocene forms possessed even less high dental crowns and a correspondingly lower mandible, while those of the Upper Pleistocene had significantly higher teeth and a more massive mandible. It is possible that this reflects an increasingly strong adaptation of Paramylodon over time. Dental microwear texture analysis (DMTA) confirms that P. harlani fed on much harder foods than the contemporary Nothrotheriops shastensis; the diet of the former likely included large amounts of roots, tubers, seeds, and fruit pits.

=== Social behaviour ===
The majority of the finds of Paramylodon are composed of single individuals, mass assemblages as for example in Rancho La Brea represent accumulations over several millennia. It can therefore be assumed that Paramylodon, like present-day arboreal representatives, lived solitary and at most formed mother-young groups. The digestive system was probably similarly structured as in living sloths, so that also in Paramylodon a rather slow metabolism prevailed with long passage time of the food, which was highly digested. The suggested slow locomotion this suggest that they did not engage in larger seasonal migrations – in contrast to numerous other grass-eaters inhabiting open landscapes. According to this, the animals were relatively sedentary. A striking feature of numerous sites with Paramylodon is the frequent co-occurrence with the Columbian mammoth and the bison. Both representatives of large herbivorous mammals, however, showed a different way of life with their herd formations and long migrations as well as deviating digestive systems. Therefore, Paramylodon probably used a different ecological niche to avoid direct competition with the other megaherbivores of the North American steppe landscapes.

== Extinction ==
Like most other ground sloths, Paramylodon became extinct at the end of Late Pleistocene as part of the Late Pleistocene megafauna extinctions. Unlike many other genera, however, there is little radiometric data available from Paramylodon measured directly from fossil material. One of the youngest known calibrated radiocarbon dates is from the locality of Gypsum Cave in Nevada, which dates to 14,603–14,213 years Before Present. The youngest date from Rancho La Brea is around 13,995–13,763 cal years Before Present, the youngest direct date for the species as of 2023. However, some more possible recent finds are known, few of which came to light from archaeological sites associated with early human settlement on the North American continent. More than 130 osteoderms have been documented from the Aubrey Clovis site in north-central Texas. The soil substrate surrounding the finds has been radiometrically dated to an age of 12,860 years BP. Stone artifacts also documented there, comprising about 9800 pieces, can also be referred to the Clovis culture on the basis of a Clovis point. The remains of Paramylodon, however, have no direct relation to the early settlers, having been found in a nearby waterhole with the exception of a single bone platelet. Remains are also known contemporaneous to Clovis culture artifacts from the Kimmswick site in Missouri, though they do not bear cut marks. It is unclear from the few common finds to date whether direct hunting led to their extinction.

That early colonizers of North America interacted with, followed, as well as possibly hunted large ground sloths is indicated by footprints from White Sands National Monument in New Mexico. Here, several hundred footprints of larger sloths are associated with those of humans on the shore of a former lake. In some cases they overlap, and in one case the human tracks lie within the track of a sloth. A striking feature of the intersecting sloth and human tracks is an abrupt change of direction in the former, suggesting a direct confrontation by the causers. However, no fossil remains are available from the site and the age of the tracks has so far only been indirectly dated (between 15,560 and 10,000 years before present). In addition, the sloth tracks have not been determined more precisely. They show strong size variations, which can be attributed either to animals of different ages or to different species. During the period in question, in addition to Paramylodon, Nothrotheriops, a smaller ground sloth from the Nothrotheriidae group, and Megalonyx, a large genus of the Megalonychidae, occurred in the region.
