= Héctor Varela =

Hector Varela may refer to:

- Héctor Varela (musician) (1914–1987), Argentine tango Bandoneonist, bandleader and composer
- Héctor Varela (author), Puerto Rican author
- Héctor Benigno Varela, Argentina military leader
