= João Varela =

João Varela may refer to:

- João Varela, Cape Verde, a settlement on the island of Santiago, Cape Verde
- João Varela (politician) (born 1974), Dutch politician
- João Vário (João Manuel Varela, 1937–2007), Cape Verdean writer
