= Manuel Varela =

Manuel Varela can refer to:

- Manuel Varela (footballer)
- Manuel Varela (wrestler)
