= Maria Varelas =

American science educator

Maria Varelas is an American science educator. She is a fellow of the American Academy of Arts and Sciences.

== Career ==
She graduated from University of Athens, University of Rochester, and University of Illinois Chicago. She teaches at University of Illinois Chicago. She was named Distinguished Researcher.

She received National Science Foundation grants to train minority science teachers. and study science learning in elementary and middle school.

== Work ==
- Varelas, Maria; Pappas, Christine C. (2006). "Intertextuality in Read-Alouds of Integrated Science-Literacy Units in Urban Primary Classrooms: Opportunities for the Development of Thought and Language". Cognition and Instruction. 24 (2). Taylor & Francis, Ltd.: 211–259. doi:10.1207/s1532690xci2402_2. ISSN 0737-0008. JSTOR 27739832.
- Varelas, Maria (2012-12-17). Identity Construction and Science Education Research. Rotterdam Boston: Springer Science & Business Media. ISBN 978-94-6209-043-9.
- Varelas, Maria; Martin, Danny B.; Kane, Justine M. (2012). "Content Learning and Identity Construction: A Framework to Strengthen African American Students' Mathematics and Science Learning in Urban Elementary Schools". Human Development. 55 (5/6). S. Karger AG: 319–339. doi:10.1159/000345324. ISSN 0018-716X. JSTOR 26764633.
- Ortiz, Ibett; Varelas, Maria (2015-09-11). "Students as authors". Academia.edu.
- Varelas, Maria (2018). "CHAPTER FOURTEEN: Dialectical Relationships and How They Shape (In) Equitable Science Learning Spaces and Places". Counterpoints. 442. Peter Lang AG: 183–191. ISSN 1058-1634. JSTOR 45212200.
