= Francisco Varela (disambiguation) =

Francisco Varela (1946–2001) was a Chilean biologist and philosopher.

Francisco Varela may also refer to:

- Francisco Varela (painter) (1580–1645), Spanish baroque painter
- Francisco Varela (footballer, born 1994), Spanish football leftback
- Francisco Varela (footballer, born 2000), Portuguese football midfielder
