= José Varela =

José Varela may refer to:

- José Pedro Varela (1845–1879), Uruguayan politician
  - José Pedro Varela, Uruguay, small Uruguayan city named after the politician
- José Gregorio Valera, Venezuelan president from 1878 to 1879
- José Enrique Varela (1891–1951), Spanish military commander
- José Victorino Varela (fl. 1910s), Chilean politician
- José Luis Varela Lagunas (born 1946), Mexican politician
- José Varela Fernández (born 1954), Puerto Rican politician
- José Luis Varela (born 1978), Venezuelan boxer
- José Varela (footballer) (born 1997), Cape Verdean footballer
