= Luis Varela =

Luis Varela may refer to:

- Luis Varela (footballer) (born 1941), Uruguayan footballer
- Luis Varela (wrestler) (born 1972), Venezuelan wrestler
- Luis Varela (actor) (born 1943), Spanish actor
- Luis Rodríguez-Varela (1768–1826), early Filipino nationalist
