= Fernando Varela =

Fernando Varela may refer to:

- Fernando Varela (Spanish footballer) (born 1979), Spanish footballer
- Fernando Varela (Cape Verdean footballer) (born 1987), Cape Verdean footballer
- Fernando Varela (singer) (born 1980), American operatic and classical crossover tenor
