= Héctor Varela (author) =

Puerto Rican writer

Héctor Varela is a Puerto Rican author. His main work, the novel Affinity for Trouble: A Puerto Rican Story (2006) tells the story of a boy growing up in Santurce, a central neighborhood of San Juan, Puerto Rico, in the 1940s and 1950s.

== Life ==
Varela was born and raised in Santurce, Puerto Rico, a neighborhood in San Juan, Puerto Rico until he was almost 11 years old, when he moved with his family to Fort Bliss, Texas. Upon arrival in the U.S., he did not speak English. After his father's infantry duty tour in Korea, Héctor became an Army brat on Army tours throughout the U.S. and Europe.

Varela served honorably in the United States Navy for eight years, then returned to Puerto Rico and became Deputy Assistant Labor Relations Director for Fluor/Daniel Caribbean during the industrial pharmaceutical boom of the 1970s. In 1980 he returned to the U.S., where he served as a Police Officer at the Miami-Dade Police Department, an Investigative Agency Manager, and an elected councilman in West Kendall, Florida. He lives with his wife, Carmen Lourdes, in Miami-Dade County, Florida.

== Works ==
- Affinity for Trouble: A Puerto Rican Story (2006)

== See also ==
- List of Puerto Rican writers
- List of Puerto Ricans
- Puerto Rican literature
