= Alfredo Varela =

Alfedo Varela may refer to:

- Alfredo Varela (Argentine writer) (1914–1984), Argentine communist writer
- Alfredo Varela Jr. (1912–1984), Mexican actor and screenwriter

== See also ==
- Alfredo Varelli (born 1914), Italian film actor
