= Joaquín Varela =

Joaquín Varela may refer to:

- Joaquín Varela (footballer, born 1997), Argentine defender for Godoy Cruz Antonio Tomba
- Joaquín Varela (footballer, born 1998), Uruguayan defender for C.S.D. Villa Española
