= Carlos Varela =

Carlos Varela may refer to:

- Carlos Varela (singer) (born 1963), Cuban singer-songwriter
- Carlos Varela (bandleader), Cuban bandleader of the 1940s-era Orquestra Havana-Madrid
- Carlos Muñiz Varela (1953–1979), Cuban resident of Puerto Rico who was murdered under suspicious circumstances in 1979
- Carlos Varela (Spanish footballer) (born 1977), Spanish footballer
- Carlos Varela (Chilean footballer) (1918–1964)
- Carlos Varela (wrestler) (born 1966), wrestler from Cuba
- Carlos Mendes Varela (born 1984), Portuguese-born French rugby league player
