= Marquesa de Varela =

Maria Julia, Marquesa de Varela (née Marin) is a Uruguayan media executive specialising in celebrity interviews. She was nicknamed "The Nutty Marquesa" by The New York Times for her court case with Michael Douglas and Catherine Zeta-Jones.

De Varela, who was born in Montevideo and gained her title after marrying Spanish aristocrat the Marques Enrique de Varela, has three children: Valeria de Montenegro (a former model), Natalia de Montenegro (an interior designer), and Bruno Varela (who is married to TV presenter Hannah Sandling). She is a self-made millionaire, with a house in London and an apartment in New York City. She and Spanish owner of ¡Hola! Eduardo Sanchez Junco own the Hello! print media brand internationally.
