= Luciano Varela =

Spanish judge

Luciano Varela Castro is a senior Spanish judge, magistrate of the Spanish Supreme Court from 2007 to 2019. He was born at Pontevedra, Galicia, in 1948 and is married with four children.

== Career ==
Luciano Varela Castro was a judge of the Audiencia Provincial of Pontevedra for 23 years, and has been a judge Spanish judge of the Supreme Court of Spain since 2007.

- Varela was a founder of the association Judges for Democracy and a law professor at the University of Santiago de Compostela.
- He created the journal Revista Xurídica Galega, a promoter of the use of the Galician language in judicial proceedings
- Varela has, in conjunction with other judges, encouraged many students of judicature, of which 40 are now judges and prosecutors, including one of his children.
- He was also the author of the draft law for the jury, which, after parliamentary procedure, was published in the Boletín Oficial del Estado with the official name of Law 5 / 1995 22 May, the Court of the Jury.

Since October 2007 Varela has served on the Criminal Division of the Supreme Court. Among his many actions appears the case of Judge Francisco Javier de Urquia in April 2009 which determined that there was no crime of trespass but bribery, for which he was sentenced to 21 months of suspension from office and fined €73,800, the minimum provided by law.

== The case against Baltasar Garzon ==
In 2009 Varela was appointed instructor in the case of the 'Star' National Court judge Baltasar Garzón Real. Garzón was charged with an alleged crime of trespass in the case of the Franco crimes, following a complaint by the labor union Manos Limpias, founded by Miguel Bernard Remón, which accused Garzón of knowingly issuing unlawful orders and or decisions

In the first order dated February 3, 2010 Varela believes that Baltasar Garzón "... acted with the purpose of circumventing the legislature's decision on the rules for locating and exhuming victims of the horrendous crimes of the Franco era, knowing that they had been subject to a law of amnesty democratically enacted by the state of Spain, whose will Garzón deliberately chose to ignore or circumvent," and that this fact may constitute a crime of perverting the course of justice.

In the same order, Varela, as the instructor, declared his court competent to process the case and ordered Garzón to testify as a defendant in criminal proceedings.

Some commentators allege that Varela is hostile to Garzón, for reasons that go back many years " and the spokesman for Judges for Democracy, Victoria Rosell, considered that the action against Garzón Varela was to "criminalize legal debate." By contrast, José Luis Barreiro, columnist and politician of the conservative People's Party, from his column in the conservative local newspaper La Voz de Galicia, argued that we are seeing the clash between two visions of the role of judges; Varela's vision, argues Barreiro, is that the judge should apply the law putting aside the problems of humanity; while Garzón's vision, still argues Barreiro, is that justice is a specific way to govern the world.

On April 7, 2010, pursuant to Criminal Procedure Law Spanish, Judge of the Supreme decided to transform action into a simplified 'summary procedure' indicting judge Baltasar Garzon on suspicion of crime of trespass that he committed his court to engage, without jurisdictional competence, a cause for the disappearances of various persons during the Franco era.

Varela's decision completes the preparation phase of the trial, which means that Garzon will sit on in the dock when the accusers provide evidence against him. The judge considers that the decisions rendered by the court of Garzón during the investigation of disappearances of persons during the Franco era are unlawful and not objective. Newspaper el Mundo, stated in an editorial that "the politics of memory are nasty" and constitute a "bloodless form of vengeance." El Mundo reported that the judge, specifically accuses Garzón, in his capacity as a judge of the National Court, of having willfully initiated and sustained allegations against deceased persons who were anyway granted amnesty by the law of 1978 and moreover, the presiding judge well knew that such investigation was not within his competence
