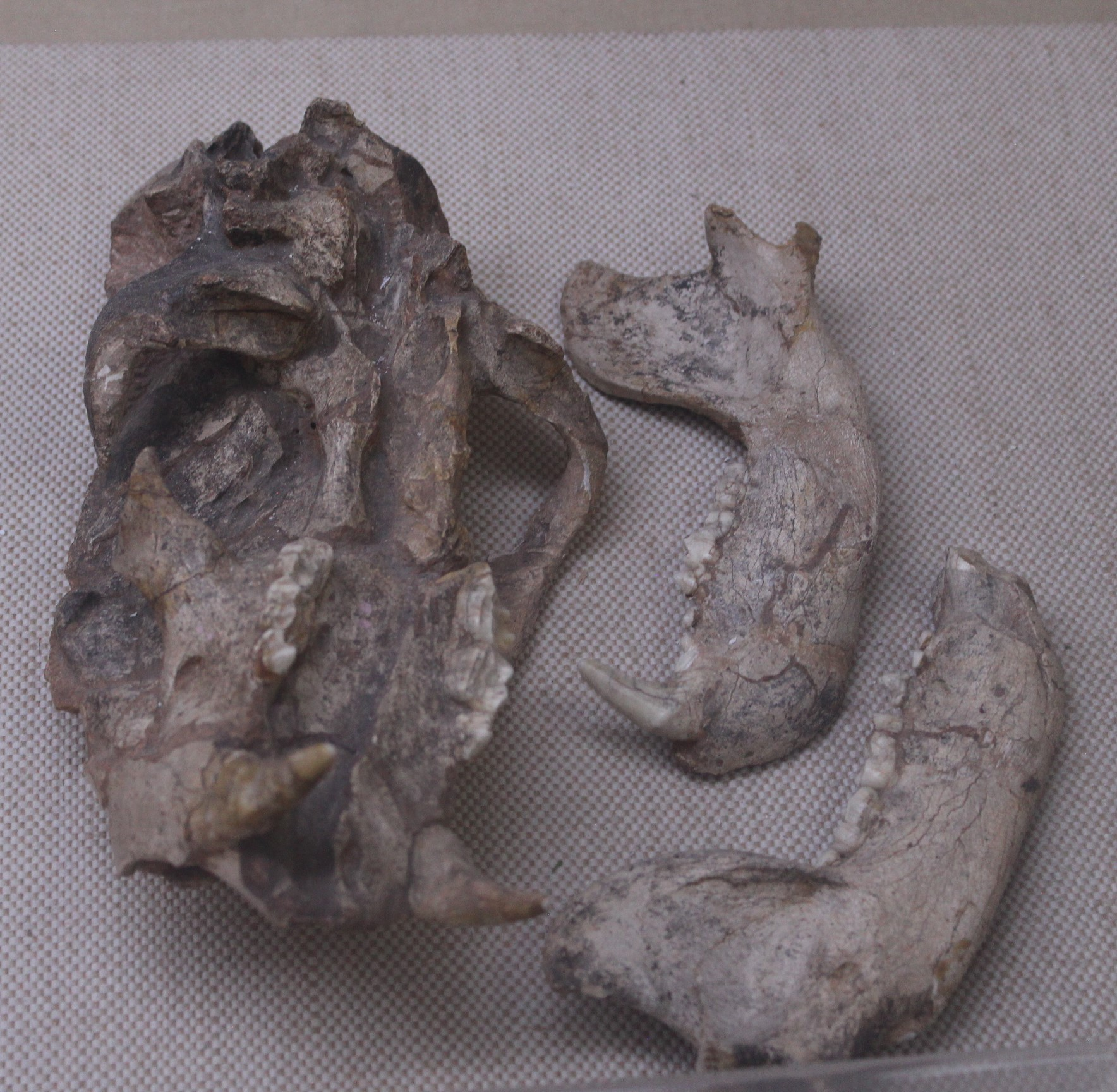
- Holotype skull and jaws (IVPP V10320) of P. yinanensis, Paleozoological Museum of China

Scientific classification
- Kingdom: Animalia
- Phylum: Chordata
- Class: Mammalia
- Order: Carnivora
- Family: Ursidae
- Subfamily: Ursinae
- Genus: †Protarctos; Kretzoi, 1945

Type species
- †Ursus boeckhi Schlosser, 1899

Species
- †P. abstrusus (Bjork, 1970); †P. boeckhi (Schlosser, 1899); †P. ruscinensis (Depéret, 1890); †P. yinanensis (Li, 1993)

= Protarctos =

Protarctos Temporal range: Pliocene–Early Pleistocene

Extinct genus of bear

Protarctos is an extinct genus of basal ursine bear that lived in North America and Eurasia during the Pliocene and into Early Pleistocene.

== Description ==
Species of Protarctos were closer in size to the American black bear (Ursus americanus) and the Asian black bear (U. thibetanus). They differ from other ursines in the primitive nature of their dental morphology.

== Systematics ==
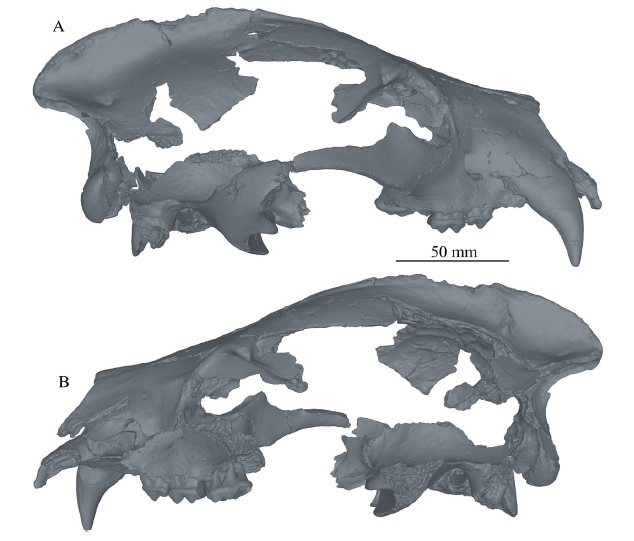
Skull of P. abstrusus

Although some paleontologists recognized the species of Protarctos as members of the genus Ursus, at least one phylogenetic analysis from Wang et al. 2017 found the genus to be an evolutionary grade outside the last common ancestor of the spectacled bear (Tremarctos ornatus) and the brown bear (U. arctos). The type species is Protarctos boeckhi (Schlosser, 1899), followed by species referred into the genus such as P. abstrusus (Bjork, 1970), P. yinanensis (Li, 1993), and P. ruscinensis (Depéret, 1890). Each of the species can be differentiated by slight differences in the morphology of the skull, molar dental morphology and size of the specimens. However, there are some authors that feel all species Protarctos should be classified as subspecies or as junior synonyms of Ursus minimus.

== Geological range ==
This genus of small bear has been found in fossil localities from Eurasia and North America. While Protarctos has been recovered from Pliocene-aged formations in Europe and North America, the genus lasted longer in Asia from the Pliocene to early Pleistocene.

== Paleobiology ==
Despite their primitive dental morphology in comparison with modern ursines, they still show evidence of moderate herbivory. Based on analysis on the teeth of P. abstrusus, it has found that the teeth showed signs of dental caries. This suggests these bears were eating high amounts of a diet high in fermentable-carbohydrates or sugars, leading to the probability these bears also undergo hibernation as seen in modern species of the genus Ursus.
