= Ursus dolinensis =

Ursus dolinensis Gran Dolina bear Temporal range: 0.9–0.78 Ma Early Pleistocene

Scientific classification
- Kingdom: Animalia
- Phylum: Chordata
- Class: Mammalia
- Infraclass: Placentalia
- Order: Carnivora
- Family: Ursidae
- Subfamily: Ursinae
- Genus: Ursus
- Species: †U. dolinensis

Binomial name
- †Ursus dolinensis García and Arsuaga, 2001

Extinct species of carnivore

Ursus dolinensis (the Gran Dolina bear) is an extinct mammalian carnivore species of the Ursidae family. Its fossilized remains were unearthed from the lowest layers of the stratigraphic sequence at the archaeological and paleontological site of Gran Dolina (also Trinchera Dolina, a section of the Trinchera del Ferrocaril, lit. Railroad trenches), that is a part of the Atapuerca Mountains complex in the Burgos province, northern Spain. The species was described by Nuria García and Juan Luis Arsuaga in a 2001 publication. Skeletal fossils, mainly cranial fragments were recovered from the sediment units TD 3 and in particular TD 4 (TD = Trinchera Dolina). Presence in these layers suggests a chronology in between 900,000 and 780,000 years ago, which falls into the Calabrian stage of the early Pleistocene.

== Morphology ==
The species has been described as the most primitive of all cave bears, and smaller than a black bear. It has a slender body comparable to brown bears (Ursus arctos) and noticeably gracile features of the cranial and mandibular bones, that to some extent resemble those of Ursus arctos and Ursus etruscus. Yet its overall morphological characteristics suggest a kinship with the line of the speleoid bears. Finally García and Arsuaga have concluded that Ursus dolinensis "is the ancestor of Ursus savini and to be very close to the common ancestor of Ursus arctos".

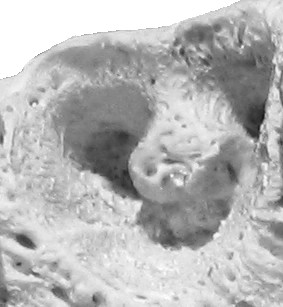
Alveolus of a bovine maxillary bone tooth

The type specimen of the Gran Dolina bear is a 255 mm (10.04 in) long left mandible fragment with the acronym Ata96-TDW4-E9-1, that retains the canine, a premolar 4, a molar 2 and the alveoli of the premolars P1, P2 and P3. Several paratype fossils include an incomplete right mandible, a right lower molar, another lower molar, two jaw fragments, one phalanx bone of the foot and a metatarsal bone. The discovery of a complete Ursus dolinensis skull during the 2012 excavation campaign and its analysis has according to the campaign's co-directors Eudald Carbonell, J.M. Bermúdez and J.L. Arsuaga helped to better determine the species' phylogenetic position.

Nuria García described more of the species' specific morphology in a comparison with the Untermaßfeld bear at the 18th International Senckenberg Conference in Weimar in 2004. She confirms the primitive brown bear-like features and highlights detailed dental traits shared by the two species, such as a "slender horizontal ramus with straight vertical profile; all teeth sides converge towards the midline". The fourth lower premolars are massive and elliptical shaped with a prominent protoconid. (Note: The mesiolingual cusp of a lower molar tooth in a mammal.) The first lower molars are slender, the second lower molars are rectangular shaped and without medial constrictions. The fourth upper premolars are triangular shaped with simple high pointed cusps. The first upper molars are quadrangular to rectangular-shaped without central constriction and finally, the second upper molars are large without torsion.

== Notes ==
Footnotes
