= Spectacled bear =

Spectacled bear Temporal range: 0.02–0 Ma Pleistocene – Holocene

Conservation status
- Vulnerable (IUCN 3.1)
- CITES Appendix I

Scientific classification
- Kingdom: Animalia
- Phylum: Chordata
- Class: Mammalia
- Order: Carnivora
- Family: Ursidae
- Genus: Tremarctos
- Species: T. ornatus

Binomial name
- Tremarctos ornatus (Cuvier, 1825)
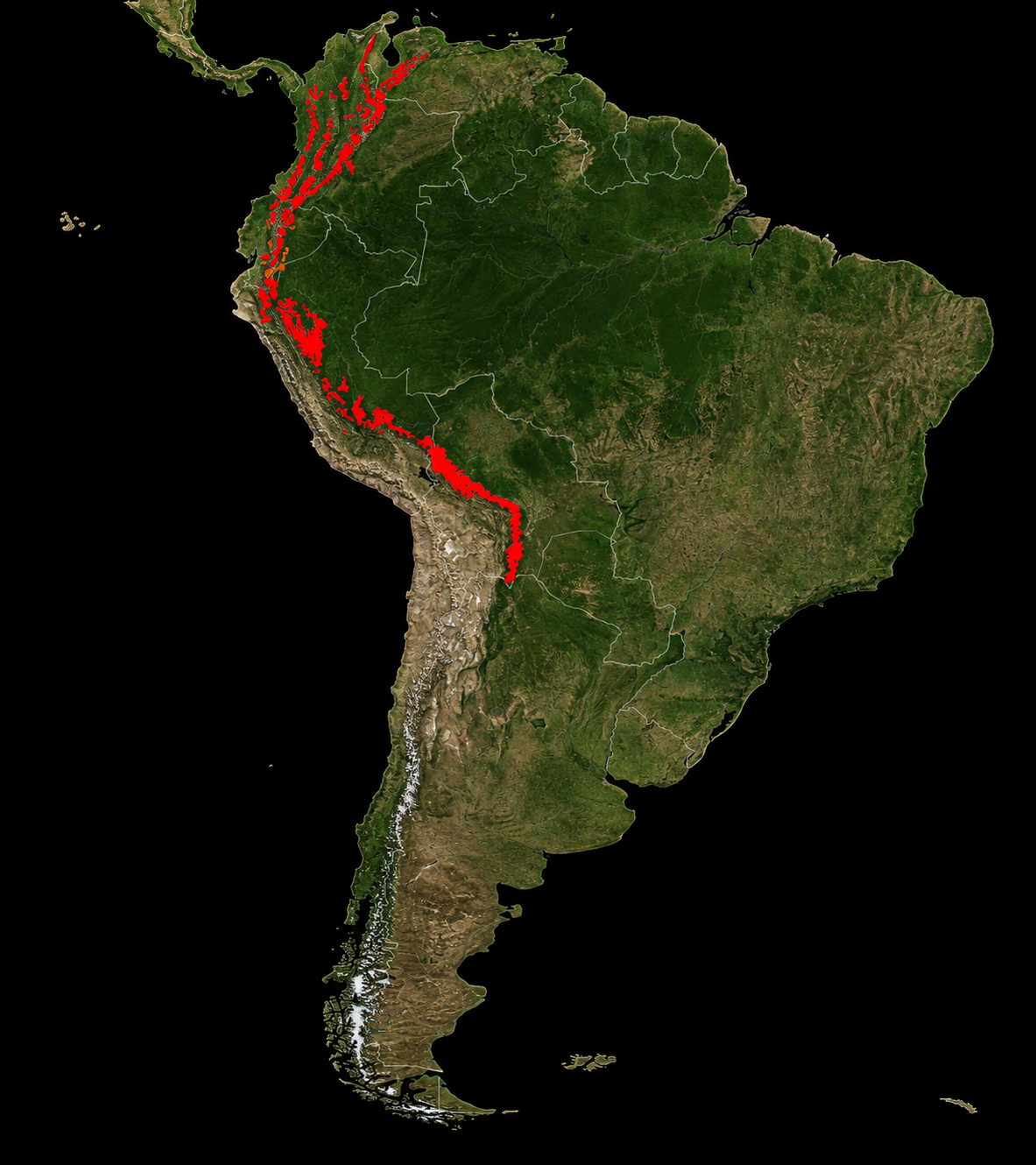
- Spectacled bear range

Synonyms
- Ursus ornatus Cuvier, 1825

Species of mammal

The spectacled bear (Tremarctos ornatus), also known as the Andean bear, is a species of bear native to the Andes Mountains in northern and western South America. It is the only living species of bear native to South America, and the last remaining short-faced bear (subfamily Tremarctinae). Unlike other omnivorous bears, the diet of the spectacled bear is mostly herbivorous. The species is classified as vulnerable by the IUCN because of habitat loss.

== Etymology ==
Tremarctos ornatus is commonly referred to in English as the "spectacled bear", a reference to the light colouring on its chest, neck and face, which may resemble spectacles in some individuals, or the "Andean bear" for its distribution along the Andes. The root trem comes from a Greek word meaning "hole"; arctos is the Greek word for "bear". Tremarctos is a reference to an unusual hole on the animal's humerus. Ornatus, Latin for "decorated", is a reference to the markings that give the bear its common English name. T. ornatus is locally known as jukumari (Aymara and Quechua), ukumari or ukuku (Quechua); translating to "hole bear", the tan facial markings usually appear on the face except around the bear's eyes, making it look like the bear has holes for eyes

== Taxonomy ==
The spectacled bear is last surviving member of the subfamily Tremarctinae (otherwise known as short-faced bears), which also includes its extinct sister species Tremarctos floridanus from North America, and the fellow short-faced bears Arctodus, and Arctotherium, which became extinct at the end of the Pleistocene around 12,000 years ago.

=== Diagnostics ===
Unlike almost all other extant bears (from the Ursinae subfamily), tremarctine bears like T. ornatus appear to have disproportionately shorter snouts, giving them the name "short-faced". This apparent shortness is an illusion caused by the deep snouts and short nasal bones of tremarctine bears compared with ursine bears; Tremarctine bears have shorter and taller skulls, but not a shorter face than most living bears.

In addition to being brachycephalic, tremarctine bears' skulls possess well developed zygomatic arches and glenoid mandibular fossas, a premasseteric fossa on the mandible and often an entepicondylar foramen on the humerus. Moreover, tremarctine bears' orbits are also bigger, more rounded and lateralized than ursine bears. Unlike tremarctine bears, ursine bears have only one masseteric fossa on their mandible and more slender and elongated skulls, with generally narrower molars (with the exception of polar bears). Cranial differences between tremarctine and ursine bears also include an extra lateral cusp between the trigonid and talonid on the m1 molar, with tremarctines possessing larger molars in comparison with ursines. Additionally, there are differences with the number of chromosomes, with Ursus possessing 74 and Tremarctos possessing 52 (although T. ornatus has crossed with U. thibetanus in captivity). Within the Tremarctinae subfamily, Tremarctos is noteworthy for its relatively smaller teeth, the presence of anterior premolars, well-defined masseteric fossae, and a W-shaped cusp pattern on the lower m1 molar.

==== Tremarctos ====
T. floridanus and T. ornatus are morphologically very similar, and are considered sister species. However, T. floridanus was around twice as big as T. ornatus, being around the size of a larger American black bear. Though both species have short rostrums in comparison with ursine bears, the rostrum of T. ornatus is relatively broader compared with T. floridanus. T. floridanus also possessed a signature "glabella" (dome-like protrusion) on the frontal bone of the cranium. Both species share practically identical dentitions (particularly behind the canines), though the dentition of T. ornatus was smaller, often with an increased number of premolars and relatively shorter molars. Tremarctos ornatus has mandibular condyles in line with the plane of the teeth while T. floridanus has raised mandibular condyles, suggesting T. ornatus potentially possesses a larger gape. The lower jaws of T. ornatus are smaller; while the ramus of the mandible is taller in T. floridanus, the relative height of the mandible's coronoid process is the same in both species. The canalis semicircularis lateral suggests that T. floridanus had a head posture of 38°, which is more oblique than its sister species T. ornatus (29°); as T. ornatus inhabits densely vegetated areas, the more oblique head posture in T. floridanus could infer a greater capacity for long distance vision.

Both species also differ slightly in their post-cranial proportions. T. floridanus has been described as a relatively long-limbed species compared to T. ornatus, with the humerus, femur and neck being notably longer compared to body length. While the forelimbs of T. ornatus are longer than their hindlimbs (likely due to arboreal activity), the hindlimbs of T. floridanus are the same length as their forelimbs. Additionally, T. ornatus has also been described as possessing much more gracile limb bones. However, the paws of T. floridanus are proportionally shorter and smaller than T. ornatus. Kurtén compared the differences between the Tremarctos species as the differences between brown bears and Eurasian cave bears.

== Evolution ==
Tremarctinae within Ursidae

- †Hemicyoninae
- - †Ursavinae
  - - Ailuropodinae
    - - Ursinae
      - - Tremarctinae (short-faced bears)
          - †Plionarctos
          - - †Arctodus
            - - Tremarctos
              - †Arctotherium

Tremarctine bears first appear as Plionarctos during the late Miocene epoch of North America. An investigation into the mitochondrial DNA of bear species indicates that the short-faced bears diverged from the Ursinae subfamily approximately 5.7 million years ago. Around the Miocene-Pliocene boundary (~5.3 Ma), tremarctine bears, along with other ursids, experienced an explosive radiation in diversity, as C_{4} vegetation (grasses) and open habitats dominated. The world experienced a major temperature drop and increased seasonality, and a faunal turnover which extinguished 70–80% of North American genera.

Correspondingly, the genetic divergence date for Arctodus is between 5.5 million and 4.8 million years ago, and between Arctotherium and Tremarctos at 4.1 million years ago. All three genera evolved from Plionarctos in the Blancan faunal stage of North America, and are first recorded as the medium-sized Arctodus pristinus, Tremarctos floridanus and Arctotherium sp. from the Late Blancan (Late Pliocene / Early Pleistocene) of North America circa 2.6 million years ago. These first appearances coincide with the start of the Quaternary Glaciation, the formation of the Panama Land Bridge, and the second phase of the Great American Biotic Interchange, with the first records of the main South American faunal wave into the United States. A Plionarctos harroldum specimen from Taunton (Washington, 2.9 Ma) appears evolutionarily intermediate between Plionarctos harroldum and Tremarctos floridanus, affirming that Plionarctos harroldum is the likely ancestor of Tremarctos.

Genetic research on the mitochondrial DNA of tremarctine bears indicates Tremarctos was more closely related to Arctotherium than Arctodus. However, a preliminary investigation of tremarctine bear's nuclear DNA suggests an extensive history of hybridization between Tremarctos and Arctodus in North America, although hybridization with Arctotherium (likely A. wingei) in either Central America or South America is also possible. Evidence of gene flow between Tremarctos and an ursine bear was also uncovered, most likely due to the extensive overlap between Tremarctos and the ancestors of the American black bear in Pleistocene North America.

=== Tremarctos genus ===
Distribution map of spectacled bear subfossils (Holocene age).

The spectacled bear does not appear in the South American fossil record until the Holocene, suggesting that the extant spectacled bear descends from an independent, later dispersal event from North America to that of Arctotherium, possibly after Arctotherium wingei became extinct in the Americas at the end of the Pleistocene (c. 12,800 BP). As T. floridanus is known from 2.7 million years ago until at least 23,000 years ago in North America, T. floridanus may have evolved into T. ornatus in South America, in either the Pleistocene or the Holocene. However, current scholarly analysis asserts that A. wingei may have restricted the range of T. floridanus outside of Central and South America until the extinction of A. wingei, where subsequently Tremarctos begins to be found in the South America. The modern spectacled bear's genetics suggest a possible history of hybridization with Arctotherium as the Tremarctos genus interacted with Arctotherium in either Central America throughout the Pleistocene, or as Tremarctos migrated into South America at the end of the Pleistocene.

However, should the spectacled bear have been present in South America during the late Pleistocene, the spectacled bear could have co-existed with Arctotherium. As the spectacled bear prefers highland forests (between 1800 and 3100 meters) and Arctotherium preferred lowlands (both A. tarijense and A. wingei have been recovered from a maximum altitude of 1860m at Tarija), their ranges would have had minimal overlap.

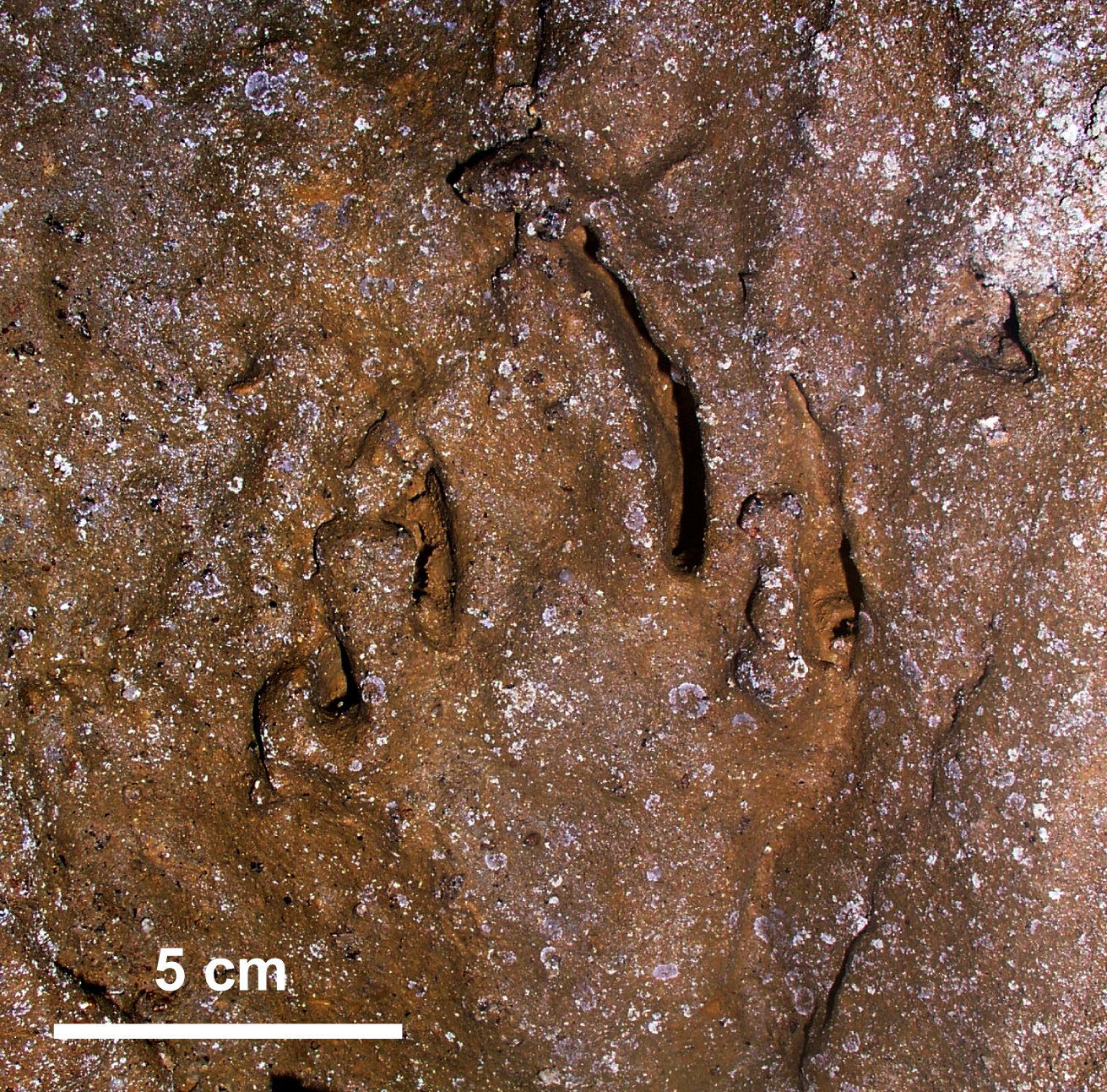
Spectacled bear footprint from Chaquil Cave, Peru

The genetic history of T. ornatus from 1 Mya to today suggests a history of decreasing population size, with effective population peaking at 450 kya (at the end of a glacial period). Correspondingly, the suggested breeding population dipped from 30,000 to 25,000, before rising to 40,000. This was followed by an extended and drastic decrease to the Holocene (2,000 breeding individuals), tied to the climatic fluctuations of the Middle Pleistocene, high temperatures during interglacials shrinking the size of forests in the Americas, and the Late Pleistocene extinctions.

Genetic research on Colombian, Ecuadorian and Venezuelan spectacled bears suggests a population divergence occurred between 15,000 and 25,000 thousand years ago. The earliest known remains of the spectacled bear are from a male from Chaquil Cave, Peru, and have been dated to 6,790 years ago (5,980 radiocarbon years). The extreme wear of the teeth suggests a primarily carnivorous diet. Further finds are two Holocene archeological sites in Colombia (dated to 4,030 BP and 2,725 BP respectively) from the Cundinamarca Department (Aguazuque), along with another from the Santander Department, an archeological site in Peru (Cajamarca Department) dated to 1,500 BP, and from the La Chimba locality in Ecuador (2,650 BP to 1,700 BP).

== Description ==
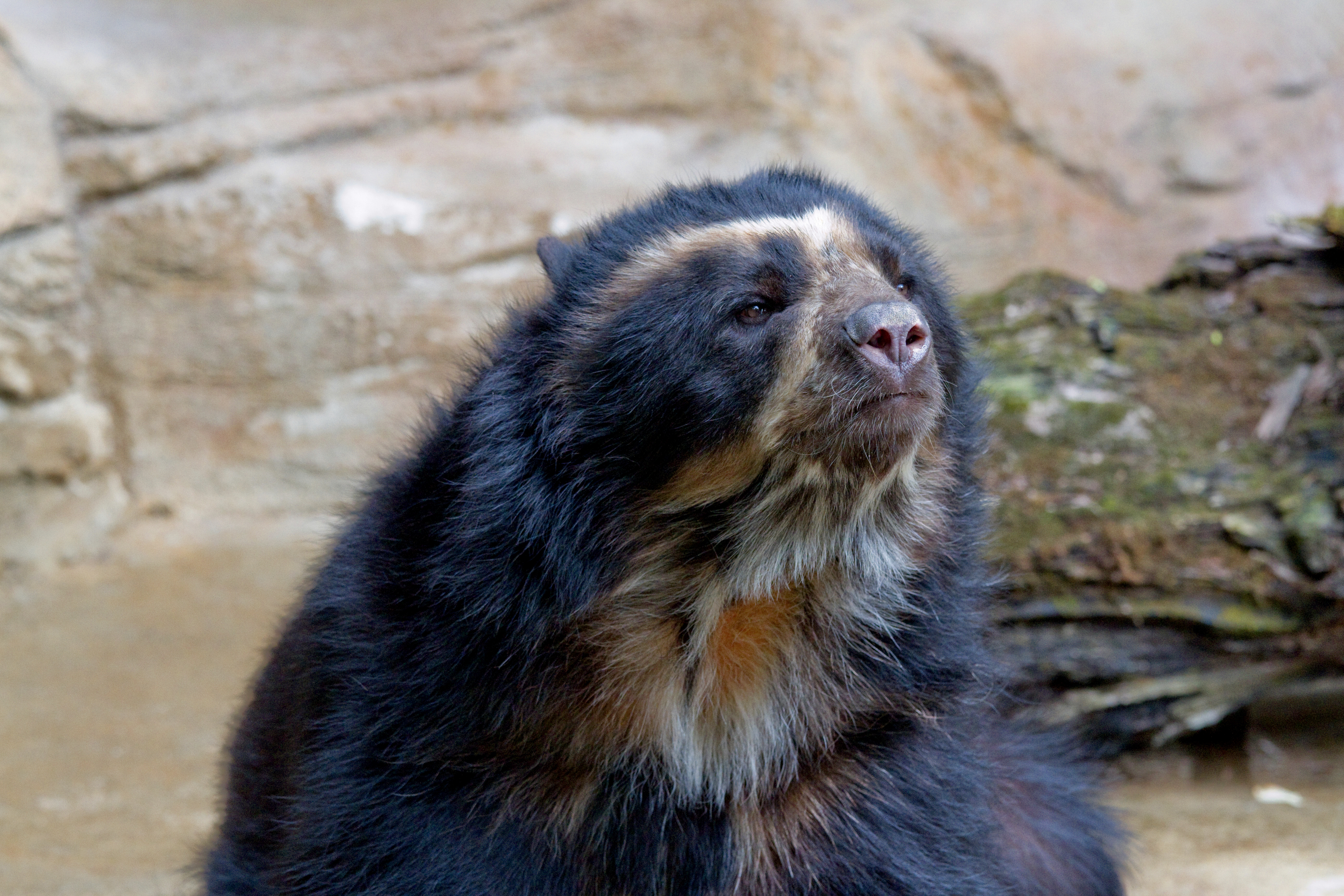
At the Cincinnati Zoo

=== Appearance ===
The spectacled bear is a mid-sized species of bear. Overall, its fur is blackish in colour, though bears may vary from jet black to dark brown and to even a reddish hue. The species typically has distinctive beige or ginger-coloured markings across its face and upper chest, though not all spectacled bears have "spectacle" markings. The pattern and extent of pale markings are slightly different on each individual bear, and bears can be readily distinguished by this.

=== Size ===
Males are a third larger than females in dimensions and sometimes twice their weight. Males can weigh from 100 to 200 kg (220 to 440 lb), and females can weigh from 35 to 82 kg (77 to 181 lb). On average males weigh about 115 kg (254 lb) and females average about 65 kg (143 lb), thus it rivals the polar bear for the most sexually dimorphic modern bear. A male in captivity that was considered obese weighed 222.5 kg (491 lb).

=== Anatomy ===
==== Cranial ====
The spectacled bear's sense of smell is extremely sensitive. They can perceive from the ground when a tree is loaded with ripe fruit. On the other hand, their hearing is moderate and their vision is short. As with other tremarctine bears, the features of the dentition can be quite variable (particularly the M2 molar). The premassateric fossa is used to detect maturity in tremarctine bears, with only T. ornatus adults possessing fully developed fossa.

==== Post-cranial ====
The shoulder height is between 70 and 90 cm (27.5 and 35.5 in), while the tail is 10 cm (3.9 in) in length. Head-and-body length can range from 1.2 to 2 m (4 to 6.5 ft), with mature males measuring a minimum of 150 cm (4.9 ft).

== Distribution and habitat ==
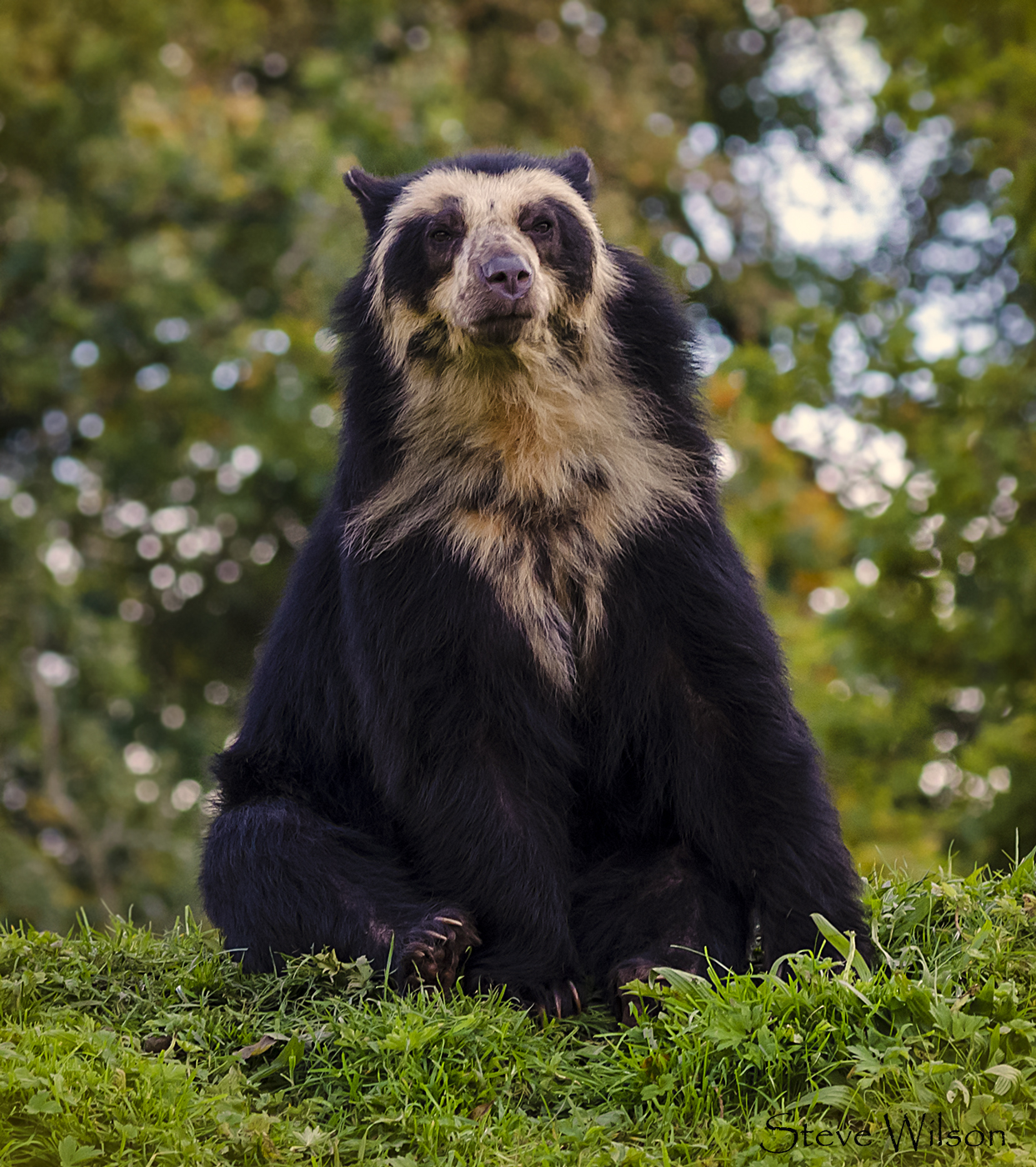

Besides some rare spilling-over into eastern Panama, spectacled bears are mostly restricted to specific regions in northern and western South America. They can range in Venezuela, Colombia, Ecuador, Peru, western Bolivia, and northwestern Argentina. Its elongated geographical distribution is only 200 to 650 km (120 to 400 mi) wide but with a length of more than 4,600 km (2,900 mi). Post-Columbian remains from the Venezuelan Coastal Ranges suggests the spectacled bear's distribution was once more widespread in the Holocene.

The species is found almost entirely in the Andes Mountains. Before spectacled bear populations became fragmented during the last 500 years, the species had a reputation for being adaptable, as it is found in a wide variety of habitats and altitudes throughout its range, including cloud forests, high-altitude grasslands (páramo), dry forests and scrub deserts. A single spectacled bear population on the border of Peru and Ecuador inhabited as great a range of habitat types as the world's brown bears (Ursus arctos) now occupy. The best habitats for spectacled bears are humid to very humid montane forests. These cloud forests typically occupy a 500 to 1,000 m (1,640 to 3,280 ft) elevational band between 1,000 and 2,700 m (3,280 and 8,860 ft) depending on latitude. Generally, the wetter these forests are the more food species there are that can support bears. Occasionally, they may reach altitudes as low as 250 m (820 ft), but are not typically found below 1,900 m (6,230 ft) in the foothills. They can even range up to the mountain snow line at over 5,000 m (16,400 ft) in elevation. Therefore, it is well known that bears use all these types of habitats in regional movements; however, the seasonal patterns of these movements are still unknown.

== Behaviour ==
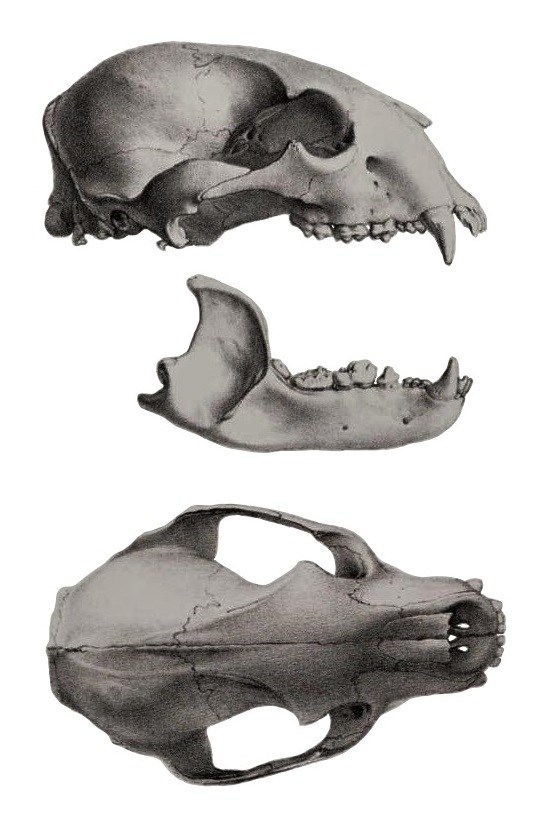
Skull

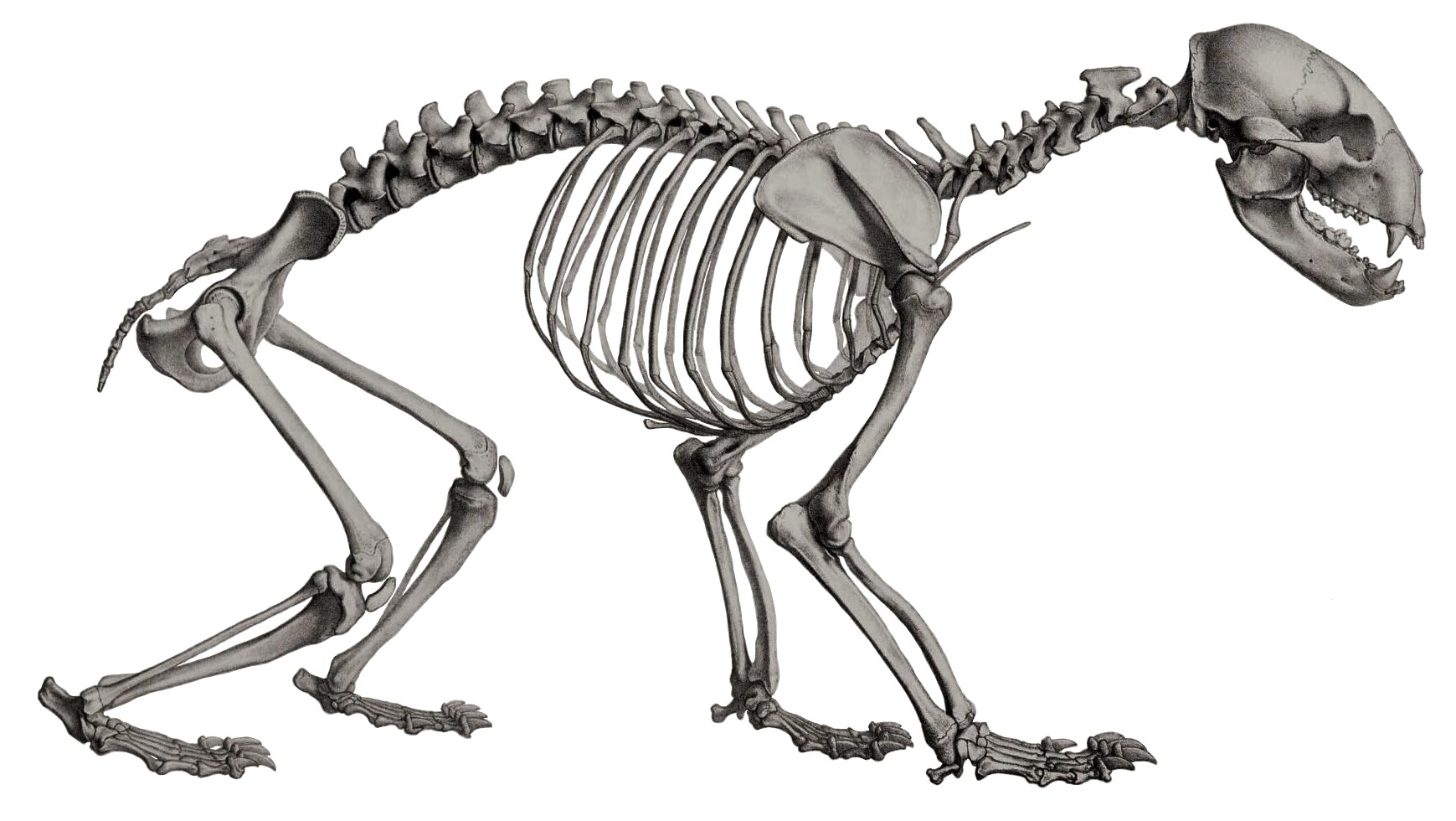
Skeleton

Spectacled bears are one of four extant bear species that are habitually arboreal, alongside the American black bear (Ursus americanus) and Asian black bear (U. thibetanus), and the sun bear (Helarctos malayanus). In Andean cloud forests, spectacled bears may be active both during the day and night, but specimens in the Peruvian desert are reported to bed down under vegetative cover during the day. Their continued survival alongside humans has depended mostly on their ability to climb even the tallest trees of the Andes. They usually retreat from the presence of humans, often by climbing trees. Once up a tree, they may often build a platform, perhaps to aid in concealment, as well as to rest and store food on. Although spectacled bears are solitary and tend to isolate themselves from one another to avoid competition, they are not territorial. They have even been recorded to feed in small groups at abundant food sources. Males are reported to have an average home range of 23 km^{2} (8.9 sq mi) during the wet season and 27 km^{2} (10 sq mi) during the dry season. Females are reported to have an average home range of 10 km^{2} (3.9 sq mi) in the wet season and 7 km^{2} (2.7 sq mi) in the dry season.

When encountered by humans or other spectacled bears, they will react in a docile but cautious manner, unless the intruder is seen as a threat or a mother's cubs are endangered. Like other bears, mothers are protective of their young and have attacked poachers. There is only a single reported human death due to a spectacled bear, which occurred while it was being hunted and was already shot. The only predators of cubs include cougars (Puma concolor) and possibly male spectacled bears. The bears "appear to avoid" jaguars, but the jaguar has considerably different habitat preferences, does not overlap with the spectacled bear in altitude on any specific mountain slope, and only overlaps slightly (900 m (2,950 ft)) in altitude if the entire Cordillera Oriental is considered based upon unpublished data. Generally, the only threat against adult bears is humans. The longest-lived captive bear, at the Salisbury Zoological Park (Maryland, US) attained a lifespan of 37 years and 11 months. Lifespan in the wild has not been studied, but bears are believed to commonly live to 20 years or more unless they run afoul of humans.

== Diet ==
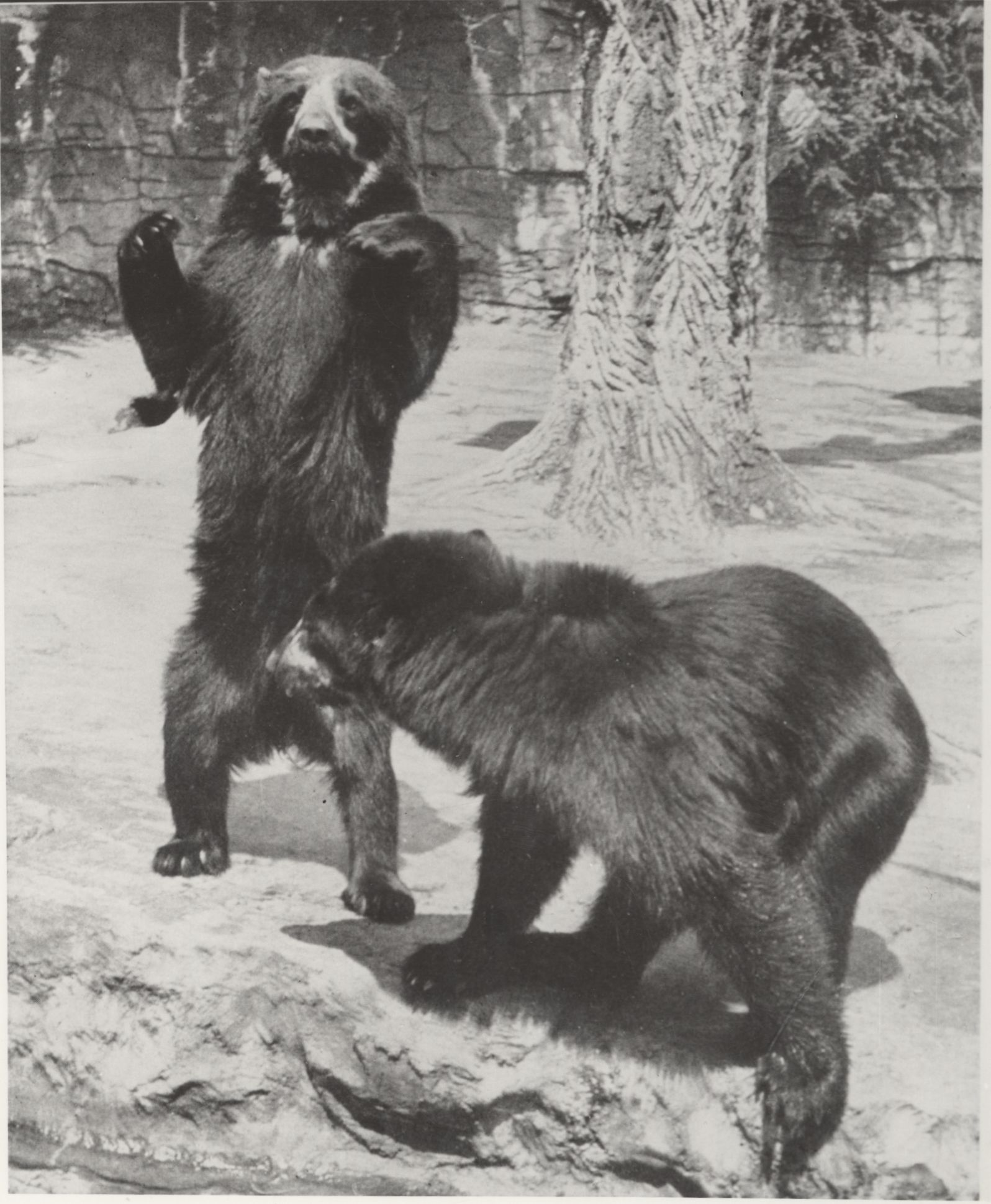
Two spectacled bears in 1962 - Touring Club Italiano

=== Herbivory ===
Spectacled bears are more herbivorous than most other bears; normally about 5–7% of their diets is meat. The most common foods for these bears include cactus, bromeliads (especially Puya ssp., Tillandsia ssp. and Guzmania ssp.) palm nuts, bamboo hearts, frailejon (Espeletia spp.), orchid bulbs, fallen fruit on the forest floor, unopened palm leaves, and moss. They will also peel back tree bark to eat the nutritious second layer. Much of this vegetation is very tough to open or digest for most animals, and the bear is one of the few species in its range to exploit these food sources. The spectacled bear has a larger zygomaticomandibularis muscle relative to the total jaw muscle mass than in the American black bear; its muzzle is relatively shorter than in the grizzly bear. Not coincidentally, both species are known for extensively consuming tough, fibrous plants. Unlike the ursid bears whose fourth premolar has a more well-developed protoconid, an adaptation for shearing flesh, the fourth premolar of spectacled bears has blunt lophs with three pulp cavities instead of two, and can have three roots instead of the two that characterize ursid bears. The musculature and tooth characteristics are designed to support the stresses of grinding and crushing vegetation. Besides the giant panda, the spectacled bear is perhaps the most herbivorous living bear species. These bears also eat agricultural products, such as sugarcane (Saccharum ssp.), honey (made by Apis ssp.), and maize (Zea mays), and have been known to travel above the tree line for berries and more ground-based bromeliads. When food is abundant, such as large corn fields, up to nine individual bears have fed close by each other in a single vicinity.

=== Predatory behaviour ===
The spectacled bear is the only bear native to South America and South America's largest land predator, although as little as 5% of its diet is composed of meat. Among South America's extant, native land animals, only the Baird's tapir, South American tapir and mountain tapir are heavier than the bear. On occasion an active predator, the spectacled bear has several hunting techniques- principally, the bear surprises or overpowers its prey, mounts its back, and consumes the immobilised animal while still alive, pinning the prey with its weight, large paws and long claws. Alternatively, the bear pursues the prey into rough terrain, hillsides, or precipices, provoking its fall and/or death. After death, the prey is dragged to a safe place (usually a nest over a tree, or a forested area) and consumed, leaving only skeletal remains.

Animal prey is usually quite small, but these bears can prey on adult deer, llama (Lama glama) and domestic cattle (Bos taurus) and horses (Equus caballus). A spectacled bear was captured on a remote video-monitor predaceously attacking an adult mountain tapir perhaps nearly twice its own body mass, and adult horse and cattle killed by spectacled bears have been even heavier. Animal prey has included rabbits, mice, other rodents, birds at the nest (especially ground-nesting birds like tinamous or lapwings (Vanellus ssp.), arthropods, and carrion. They are occasionally accused of killing livestock, especially cattle, and raiding corn fields. Allegedly, some bears become habituated to eating cattle, but the bears are actually more likely to eat cattle as carrion; farmers may mistakenly assume the spectacled bear killed them. Due to fear of loss of stock, bears may be killed on sight.

== Reproduction ==
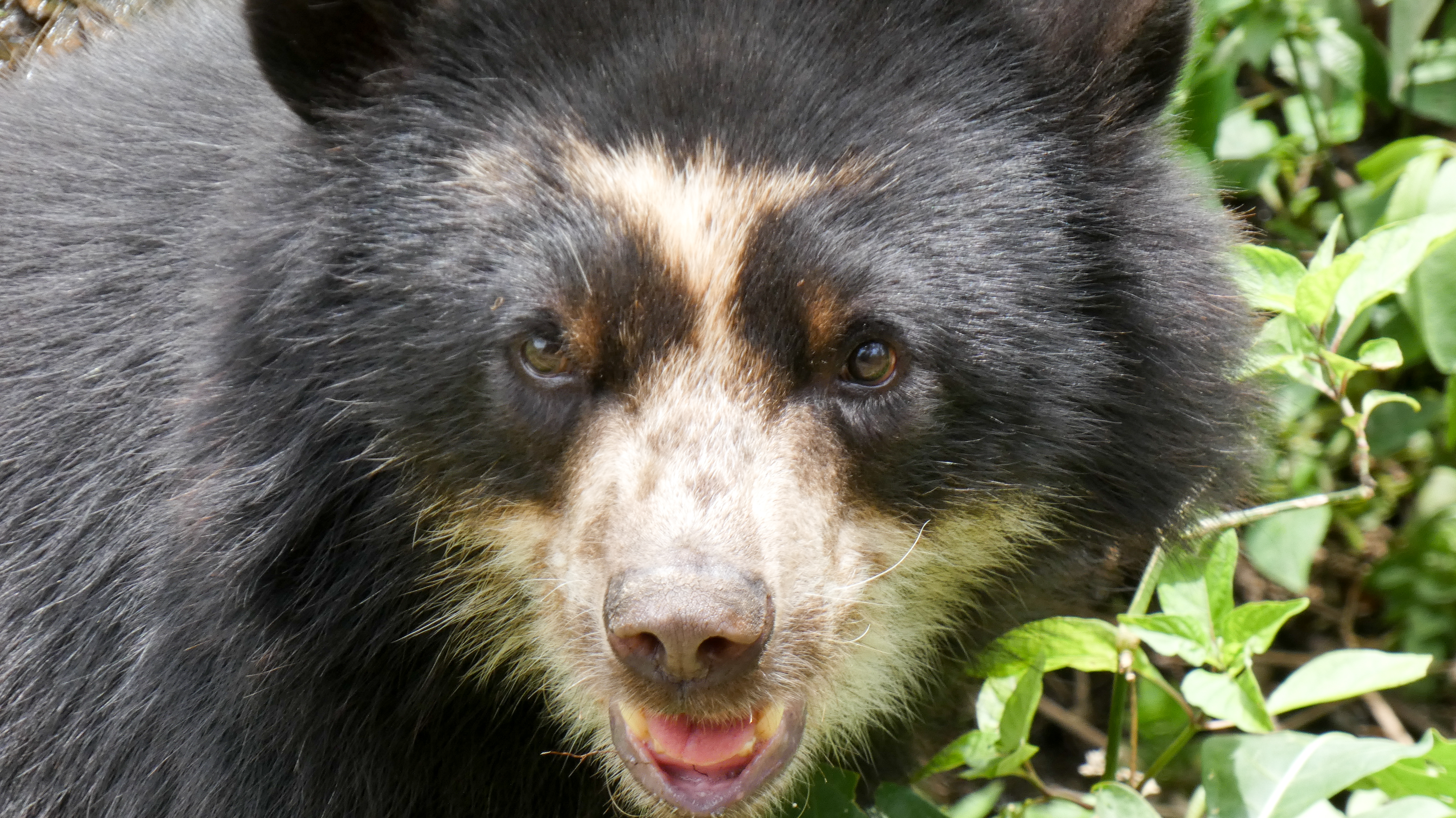
Tremarctos ornatus in the Chaparri Reserve in Chiclayo, Lambayeque, Peru

Most of the information available about the reproduction of this species has been through observation of captive animals. In captivity, mating is concentrated in between February and September, according to the latitude, and, in the wild, it has been seen how mating may occur at almost any time of the year, but activity normally peaks in April and June, at the beginning of the wet season and corresponding with the peak of fruit-ripening. The mating pair are together for one to two weeks, during which they will copulate multiple times for 12–45 minutes at a time. The courtship is based on games and non-aggressive fights while intercourse can be accompanied by loud sounds from both animals.

In the wild, births usually occur in the dry season, between December and February. However, in captivity, it occurs all year within the species' distribution. The gestation period is 5.5 to 8.5 months. From one to three cubs may be born, with four being rare and two being the average. The cubs are born with their eyes closed and weigh about 300 to 330 g (11 to 12 oz) each. Although this species does not give birth during the hibernation cycle as do northern bear species, births usually occur in a small den and the female waits until the cubs can see and walk before she leaves with them, this occurs in between three and four months after birth.

Females grow more slowly than males. The size of the litter has been positively correlated with both the weight of the female and the abundance and variety of food sources, particularly the degree to which fruiting is temporally predictable. The cubs often stay with the female for one year before striking out on their own. This is related to the time mothers breastfeed (1 year), but keep providing maternal care for an additional year. Breeding maturity is estimated to be reached at between four and seven years of age for both sexes, based solely on captive bears. Females usually give birth for the first time when they are 5 years old and their fecundity is shorter than that of the males, who keep fertility almost all their lives. Something that is in favor of the subsistence of the bear population is their longevity, since they are able to raise at least two cubs to adulthood, contributing to population replacement. Wild bears can live for an average of 20 years.

== Threats ==
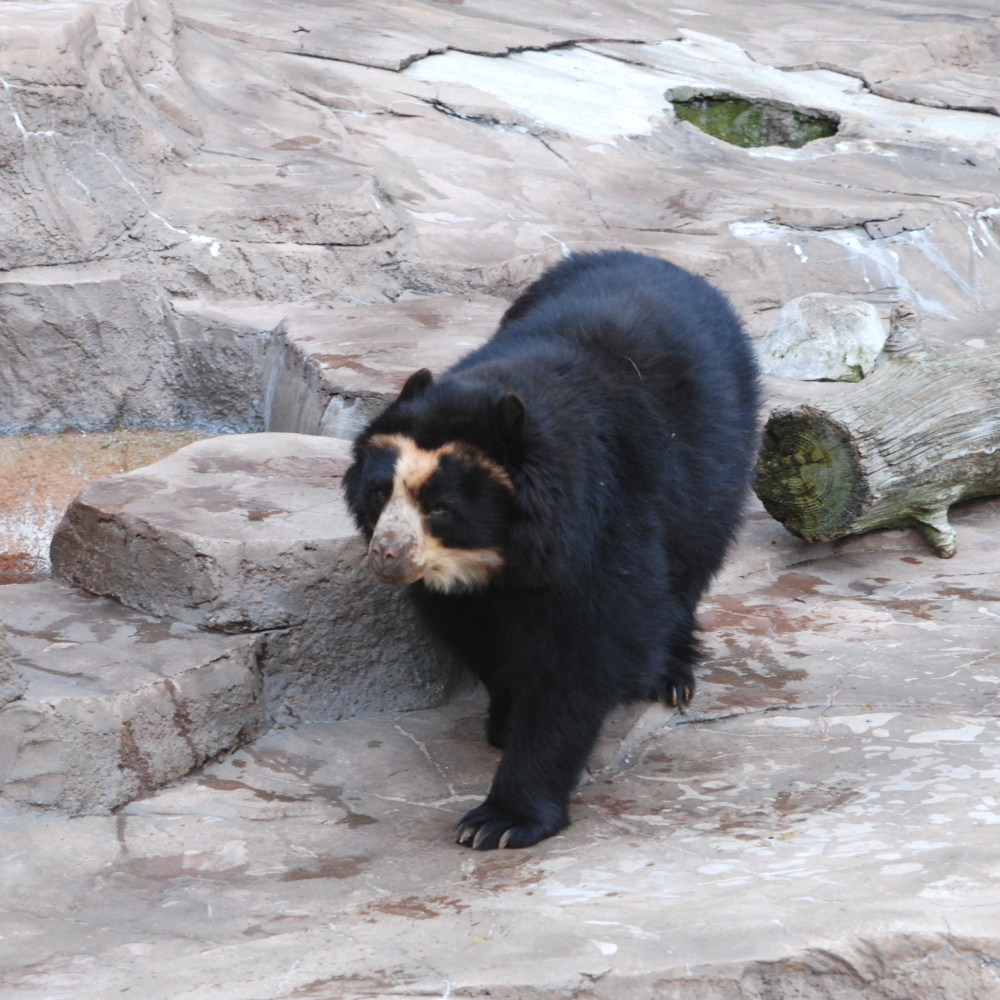
Spectacled bear at Tennoji Zoo in Osaka, Japan

The Andean bear is threatened due to poaching and habitat loss, attributable to agricultural expansion and illegal mining. Poaching might have several reasons: trophy hunting, pet trade, religious or magical beliefs, natural products trade and conflicts with humans.

=== Hunting ===
Trophy hunting of Andean bear was apparently popular during the 19th century in some rural areas of Latin-America. In the costumbrist novel María by Colombian writer Jorge Isaacs, it was portrayed as an activity for privileged young men in Colombia. Tales regarding pet bears are also known from documents about the Ecuadorian aristocracy of that time. These threats might have diminished in recent years, but there are still isolated reports of captive bears confiscated in rural areas, which usually are unable to adapt again to their natural habitat and must be kept in zoological facilities.

=== Habitat loss ===
Nowadays, the distribution area of the Tremarctos ornatus is influenced by the human presence, mainly due to habitat destruction and degradation, hunting and fragmentation of populations. This fragmentation is mainly found in Venezuela, Colombia, Ecuador and Argentina. It represents several problems to this population because, first, their persistence is compromised if they are small, isolated populations, even without facing habitat loss or hunting. Second, the transformation of the landscape represents loss of availability of the type of habitats spectacled bears need. Third, fragmentation exposes bears to hunting and killing due to its accessibility. Perhaps the most epidemic problem for the species is extensive logging and farming, which has led to habitat loss for the largely tree-dependent bears. Shortage of natural food sources might push bears to feed on crops or livestock, increasing the conflict that usually results in poaching of individuals. Impacts of climate changes on bear habitat and food sources are not fully understood, but might have potential negative impact in the near future. Limited habitat viability and low overall population may also intensify the effects of poaching by concentrating bears into smaller areas of suitable habitat but higher poaching risk.

=== Human–bear conflict ===
Andean bears are often suspected of attacking cattle and raiding crops, and are killed in retaliation or in order to avoid further damages. It has been argued that attacks to cattle attributed to Andean bear are partly due to other predators. Raiding of crops can be frequent in areas with diminishing natural resources and extensive crops in former bear habitat, or when problematic individuals get used to human environments.

=== Perception of the Andean bear ===
There are two views of the Andean Bears. One is ex-situ, people that live far from where the bears inhabit; for them, the spectacled bears are usually charismatic symbols of the wilderness, animals that are not aggressive and that are mainly vegetarians. The other view is in-situ, people that live in areas where the bears inhabit; for them, bears are cattle predators, pests that should be killed as a preventative measure and where any cattle loss is immediately attributed to them, becoming persecuted and hunted.

Religious or magical beliefs might be motivations for killing Andean bears, especially in places where bears are related to myths of disappearing women or children, or where bear parts are related to traditional medicine or superstitions. In this context, the trade of bear parts might have commercial value. Their gall bladders appear to be valued in traditional Chinese medicine and can fetch a high price on the international market. Conflicts with humans, however, appear to be the most common cause of poaching in large portions of its distribution.

== Conservation ==
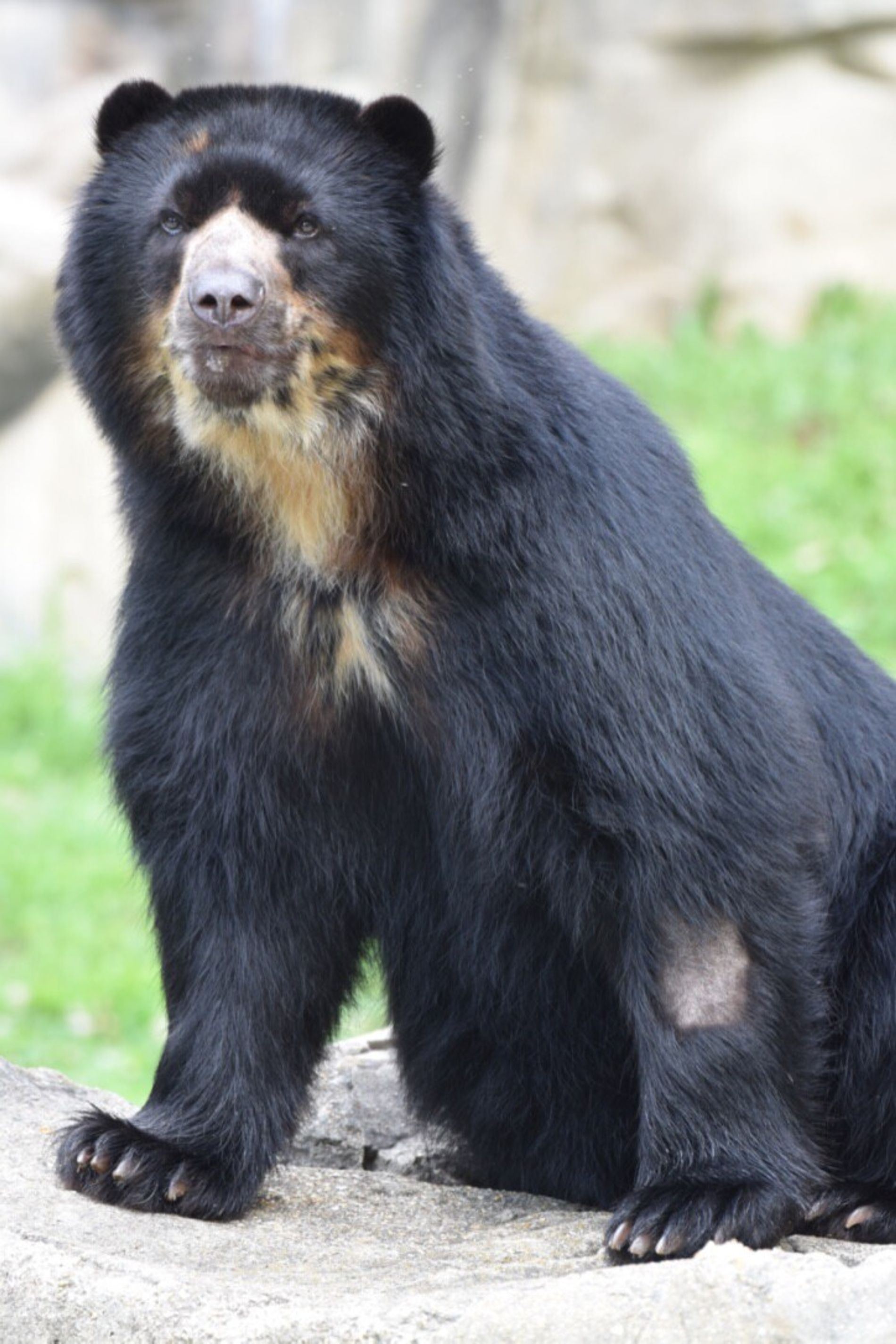

The IUCN has recommended the following courses for spectacled bear conservation: expansion and implementation of conservation land to prevent further development, greater species level research and monitoring of trends and threats, more concerted management of current conservation areas, stewardship programs for bears which engage local residents and the education of the public regarding spectacled bears, especially the benefits of conserving the species due to its effect on natural resources.

National governments, NGOs and rural communities have made different commitments to conservation of this species along its distribution. Conservation actions in Venezuela date back to the early 1990s, and have been based mostly on environmental education at several levels and the establishment of protected areas. The effort of several organisations has led to a widespread recognition of the Andean bear in Venezuelan society, raising it as an emblematic species of conservation efforts in the country, and to the establishment of a 10-year action plan. Evidence regarding the objective effectiveness of these programs (like reducing poaching risk, maintaining population viability, and reducing extinction risk) is subject to debate and needs to be further evaluated.

Legislation against bear hunting exists, but is rarely enforced. This leads to persistence of the poaching problem, even inside protected areas.

In 2006, the Spectacled Bear Conservation Society was established in Peru to study and protect the spectacled bear.

=== Spectacled bear and protected areas ===
To evaluate the protected status of the Andean bears researchers evaluated the percentage of their habitats included in national and protected areas in 1998. This evaluation showed that only 18.5% of the bear range was located in 58 protected areas, highlighting that many of them were small, especially those in the northern Andes. The largest park had an area of 2,050 km^{2} (790 sq mi) while the median size of 43 parks from Venezuela, Colombia and Ecuador was 1,250 km^{2} (480 sq mi), which may result too small to maintain a sustainable bear population. Therefore, these researchers stated the importance of the creation of habitat blocks outside protected areas since they might provide opportunities for the protection of these animals.

=== Other suggested conservation strategies ===
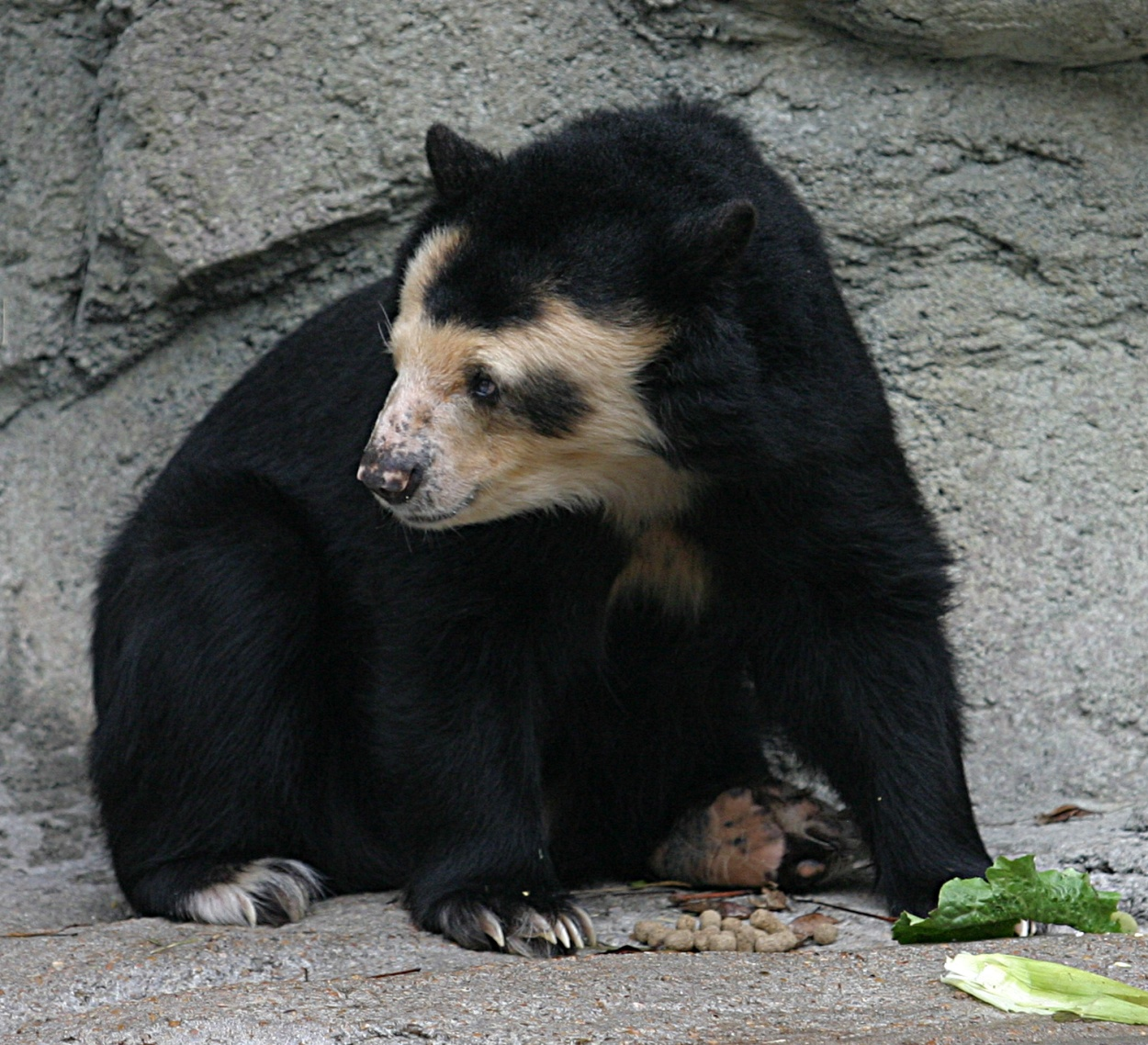
Spectacled bear at the Houston Zoo in Texas, US

Researchers suggest the following spectacled bear conservation strategies:

- Protect high-quality habitats while maintaining connectivity between their different elevational zones. In reality, it is not possible to manage all the undisturbed habitat the bears need in the long term. As such, it is important to identify those high-quality habitats that maximize biodiversity gain.
- Alleviate human-bear conflicts through conflict management, thinking about the spatial configuration of this animal habitat.
- Mitigate human impacts on protected areas through the design of comprehensive management strategies.
- Sustain landscape diversity in the bear conservation study areas to ensure them food and seasonal access to resources in all the habitats they frequent.
- Maintain bear population connectivity, emphasizing those conservation areas that connect different ecosystems, such as the cloud forest and the paramo.
- Rethink roads: where they are built, how and with what purpose, understanding that they define the macro configuration of bear habitat and are a barrier for bear movements and population connectivity.
- Integrate hydrological criteria at a landscape scale will benefit bears and other biotic communities that associate with aquatic environments, including humans. Linking bear habitat conservation and water management can be effective for the development of conservation strategies that benefit all.
- In places where it is almost impossible to establish new protected areas due mainly to the fact that many people already live in the area, the creation of natural corridors is possibly the best tool for the conservation of species with migratory patterns such as the endangered Andean bear.

=== Ecuador ===
Spectacled bears in Ecuador live in approximately 50,000 km^{2} (19,000 sq mi) of paramo and cloud forest habitats. About one-third of this area is part of the National System of Protected Areas and the remaining 67% is located on unprotected, undeveloped areas that have suffered a substantial reduction of approximately 40% from its original distribution.

Due to this land-use conversion to agricultural uses, important amounts of the spectacled bear habitat have been lost. This has fragmented their territory and isolated populations to small areas that might result in extirpations in the long term. Therefore, the distribution of the species in the country is set in numerous habitat patches, from which many are small.

== In popular culture ==
- The children's character Paddington Bear is a spectacled bear from Peru.
- Stephen Fry authored a book, Rescuing the Spectacled Bear: A Peruvian Diary, following two BBC programmes documenting him visiting Peru to participate in rescuing a couple of spectacled bears.
