= Rita (chimpanzee) =

Japanese chimpanzee (1928–1940)

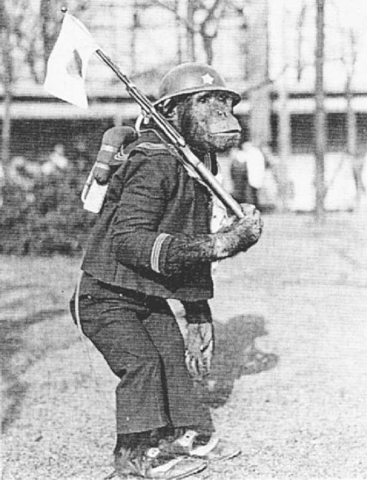
- Rita in 1938
- Species: Pan troglodytes
- Sex: Female
- Born: c. 1928; Nairobi, British Kenya
- Died: July 1940 (aged 11–12); Tennōji Zoo, Osaka, Japan
- Mate: Lloyd
- Offspring: 1

Rita (Japanese: リタ; c. 1928 – July 1940) was a female chimpanzee who lived at Tennōji Zoo in Japan. She was a popular attraction at the zoo, famous across Japan for her tricks and the way she was sometimes dressed as a geisha. During the Second Sino-Japanese War, she and her mate, Lloyd, were used as military propaganda. They were dressed as soldiers and made to carry guns and the Japanese flag. Rita died in July 1940 due to complications from childbirth and malnutrition.

== Life ==
In the 1930s, Tennōji Zoo made plans to acquire a new chimpanzee after their previous one, Tarō, had died of pneumonia after only a month in the zoo. In the late 1920s or early 1930s, Tennōji Zoo officials made arrangements for Isamu Kagawa, an animal dealer in Japan who would later go on to become a zoo director, to go to Africa to acquire a replacement chimpanzee for their collection after the death of their previous one, Tarō. Kagawa went to Nairobi, then-British Kenya and selected the then four-year old Rita. She was taken to Japan by boat and arrived at the zoo on July 19, 1932. She made her first public appearance at Tennōji Zoo a few weeks later, on September 1.

During her time at the zoo, and during her trip from Kenya, Rita was taught to play shogi, brush her teeth, eat with forks and chopsticks, participate in Japanese tea ceremonies, ride a bicycle, and smoke cigarettes. She was sometimes made to dress in a kimono and wig as a geisha. This was widely reported in Japanese newspapers, which humanized her in the eyes of the public and helped her become a celebrity in Japan. She was filmed by American movie company Paramount Pictures. Her popularity was responsible for increasing the number of visitors to Tennōji Zoo; in 1934, two years after her arrival, approximately 2.5 million people visited the zoo, nearly a million more than had visited Ueno Zoo in Tokyo. Her popularity also inspired other zoos in Nagoya, Kyoto, and Kobe to purchase chimpanzees for their own collections.

Rita's treatment was questioned however, and zoologists such as Yoshitaka Tsutsui unsuccessfully advocated for zoo animals such as Rita to be kept in more educational environment, and not be used for entertainment in this manner. At some point, Tennōji Zoo got Rita a mate, Lloyd (Japanese: ロイド, romanized: Roido). During the Second Sino-Japanese War, Rita and Lloyd were dressed up as soldiers and made to carry guns and the Japanese flag to increase public morale. Rita became known as a "propaganda icon".

== Death and legacy ==
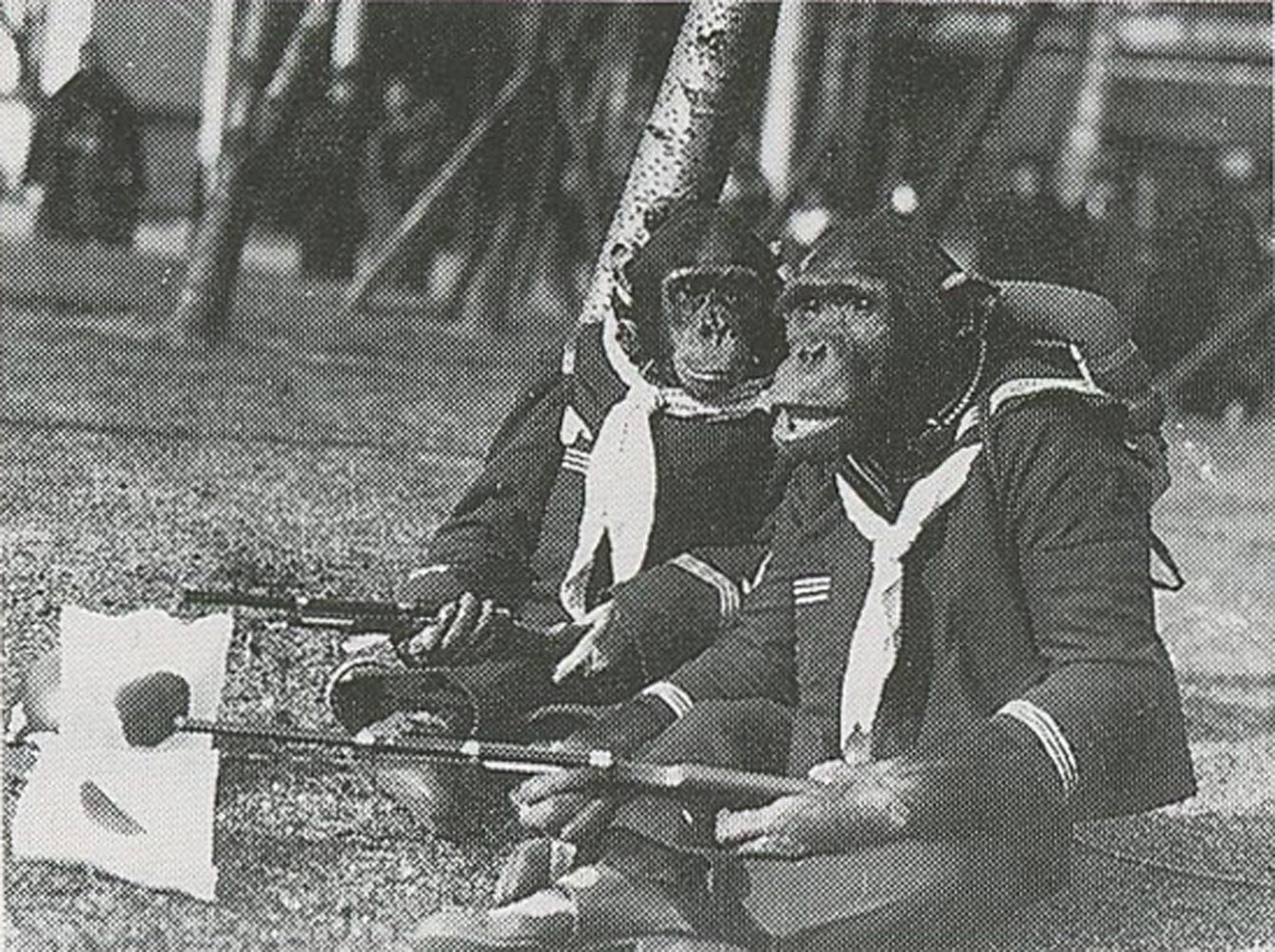
Rita and Lloyd, dressed as soldiers

In July 1940, Rita gave birth to a stillborn baby. Rita, who had been suffering from the effects the birth and malnutrition due to food shortages at the zoo, died the next day. The bodies of Rita and her baby were taxidermied. Shortly after the deaths of his mate and offspring, English was banned by the Ministry of Education and Lloyd was renamed Katsuta.

Starting in 2006, the zoo began holding annual exhibits on the zoo animals during wartime, including Rita and Lloyd. The display includes pictures of them in their military uniforms and a taxidermied display of Rita holding her baby.

== See also ==
- List of individual apes
- Propaganda in Japan during the Second Sino-Japanese War and World War II
