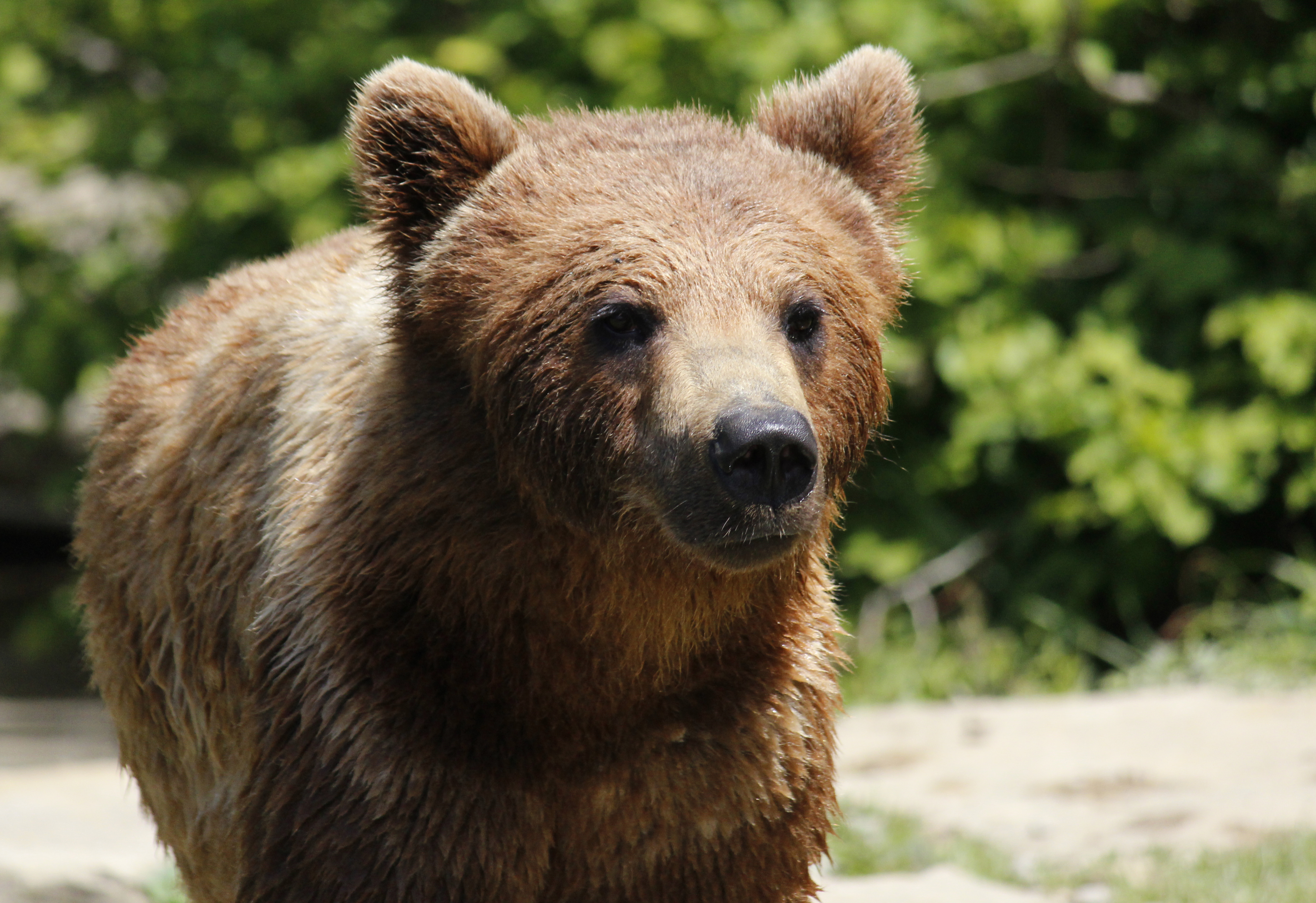
- A Eurasian brown bear (Ursus arctos arctos)

Scientific classification
- Kingdom: Animalia
- Phylum: Chordata
- Class: Mammalia
- Order: Carnivora
- Family: Ursidae
- Subfamily: Ursinae; Fischer de Waldheim, 1817

Genera
- Helarctos; Melursus; Ursus; †Protarctos

Audio
- Bear growl

= Ursinae =

Ursinae Temporal range: Barstovian–Recent

Subfamily of bears

Ursinae is a subfamily of the family Ursidae (bears).

== Extent of the subfamily ==
In some systems, including the system used in this article (see below), the subfamily Ursinae comprises only the genera Ursus (often including †Protarctos), Helarctos and Melursus.

In other systems, however, the subfamily Ursinae comprises also the Arctotheriini (=Tremarctini; i. e. mainly the genus Tremarctos) and more recently also the genus Aurorarctos and a part of the traditional Ursavini. Sometimes, the subfamily Ursinae is defined even more broadly: it also comprises the Ailuropodinae and all Ursavini and sometimes, in addition, the Hemicyoninae.

The subfamily was named "Ursinae" by William Swainson in 1835. In his text, Ursinae was a subfamily of the family Mustelidae and it included also what is today called Procyonidae and the genus Meles.

== Other ranks and names ==
What is called subfamily Ursinae in this article (i.e. Ursus, Helarctos, Melursus and often also Protarctos), is classified as tribe Ursini in some systems. Depending on the system used, the tribe Ursini is either one of the tribes of a broadly defined subfamily Ursinae (see above) or it is the only tribe of the subfamily Ursinae as defined in this article.

What is called subfamily Ursinae in this article, is (also) classified as genus Ursus sensu lato in some systems.

== Internal classification ==
The Asiatic black bear, the American black bear, the polar bear and the cave bear (and cave-bear-like species) used to be placed in their own genera, Selenarctos, Euarctos, Thalarctos and †Spelearctos , respectively; these are now placed at subgenus rank.

The internal classification of the subfamily is as follows (the taxa are arranged in alphabetical order):
Subfamily Ursinae Fischer de Waldheim, 1817:

- Helarctos Horsfield, 1825 [sometimes included in the genus Ursus]
  - Helarctos malayanus (Raffles, 1821) – sun bear
- Melursus Meyer, 1793 [sometimes included in the genus Ursus]
  - †Melursus theobaldi (Lydekker, 1884)
  - Melursus ursinus (Shaw, 1791) – sloth bear
- †Protarctos Kretzoi, 1945 [often included in the genus Ursus, sometimes more specifically in the species Ursus minimus]
  - †Protarctos abstrusus (Bjork, 1970)
  - †Protarctos boeckhi (Schlosser, 1899) – including †Ursus sinomalayanus Thenius, 1947/Helarctos sinomalayanus
  - †Protarctos ruscinensis (Depéret, 1890)
  - †Protarctos yinanensis (Li, 1993)
- Ursus Linnaeus, 1758
  - Ursus americanus (Pallas, 1780) – American black bear [= subgenus Euarctos] - including †Ursus vitabilis Gidley, 1913
  - Ursus arctos Linnaeus, 1758 – brown bear [= subgenus Ursus] – including †Ursus pyrenaicus (Depéret, 1892) and †Ursus sackdillingensis Heller, 1955
  - cave bears [= subgenus Spelearctos]:
    - †Ursus deningeri Richenau, 1904
    - †Ursus ingressus Rabeder, Hofreiter, Nagel & Withalm 2004
    - †Ursus kudarensis Baryshnikov, 1985
    - †Ursus rossicus Borissiak, 1930
    - †Ursus savini (Andrews, 1922)
    - †Ursus spelaeus Rosenmüller, 1794 – cave bear
  - †Ursus dolinensis (Garcia & Arsuaga, 2001)
  - †Ursus etruscus Cuvier, 1823
  - Ursus maritimus Phipps, 1774 – polar bear [= former subgenus Thalarctos, today usually in subgenus Ursus together with U. arctos]
  - †Ursus minimus (Devèze & Bouillet, 1827)
  - Ursus thibetanus (Cuvier, 1823) – Asiatic black bear [= subgenus Selenarctos]

A number of hybrids have been bred between American black, brown, and polar bears (see Ursid hybrids).
