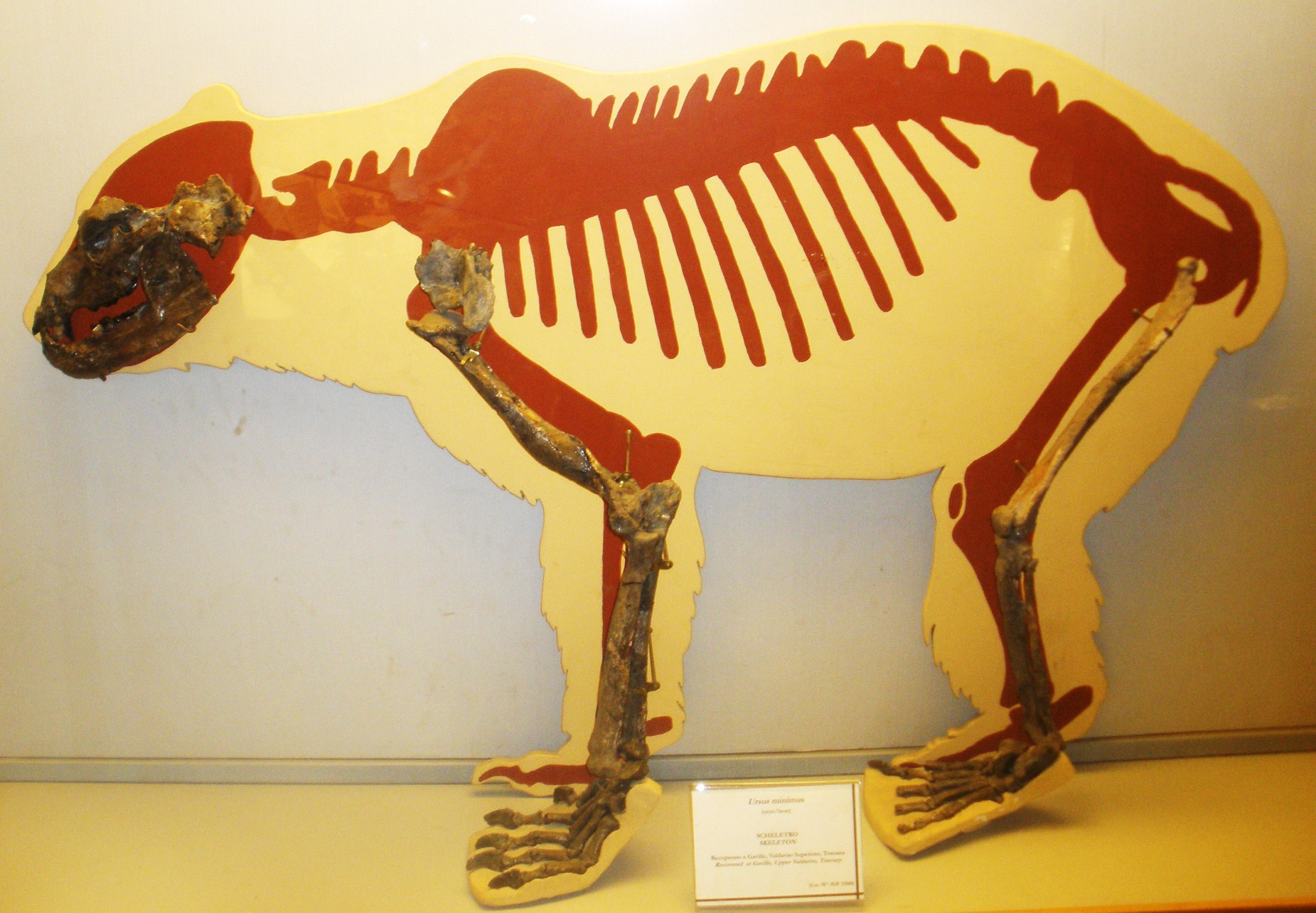

Scientific classification
- Kingdom: Animalia
- Phylum: Chordata
- Class: Mammalia
- Infraclass: Placentalia
- Order: Carnivora
- Family: Ursidae
- Subfamily: Ursinae
- Genus: Ursus
- Species: †U. minimus

Binomial name
- †Ursus minimus Devèze & Bouillet, 1827

Synonyms
- Ursus arvernensis Croizet & Jobert, 1828; Helarctos arvernensis (Croizet & Jobert, 1828) sensu Depéret, 1890; Helarctos arvernensis pyrenaicus Depéret, 1892; Ursus wenzensis Stach, 1953

= Ursus minimus =

Ursus minimus Temporal range: Pliocene–Pleistocene

Extinct species of carnivore

Ursus minimus (the Auvergne bear) is an extinct species of bear, endemic to Europe during the Pliocene and Pleistocene, living from 5.3 to 1.8 Mya, existing for about 3.5 million years.

U. minimus appears to have given rise to Ursus etruscus. The range of U. minimus was continental Europe, as far east as the Black Sea in Russia and as far south as Italy.

The skeleton of U. minimus was very similar to that of the larger Asian black bear. With the exception of the age of the bones, it is often difficult to distinguish the remains of U. minimus from those of modern Asian black bears.

== Distribution ==
Fossils of U. minimus are known from France, Slovakia, Hungary, Ukraine, Italy, Bulgaria, Georgia, and Russia.

== Fossil sites ==
Sites and specimen ages:

- Kossiakino 1, Stavropol'skaya, Russian Federation ~5.3—3.4 Mya.
- Kuchurgan gravel site, Ukraine ~4.9—4.2 Mya.
- Osztramos locality 7, Caves of Aggtelek Karst and Slovak Karst, Borsod-Abaúj-Zemplén County, Hungary ~3.4—1.8 Mya.
- Seneze (Domeyrat) site, France ~3.4—1.8 Mya.
- Meleto site, Tuscany, Italy ~3.2—2.5 Mya.
