= Tennōji Zoo =

Zoo in Osaka, Japan, opened 1915

Tennoji Zoo 天王寺動物園
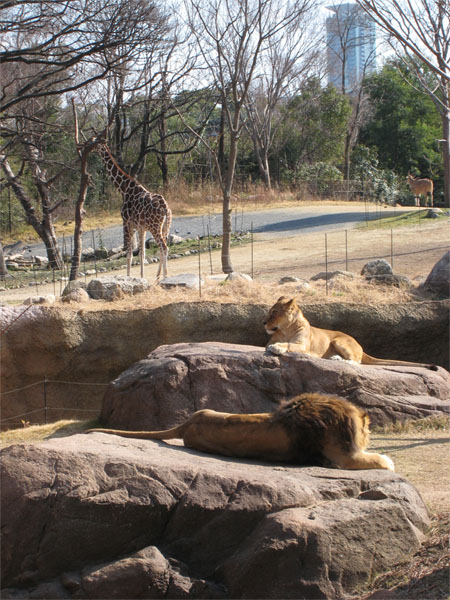
- Savannah Zone
- Interactive map of Tennoji Zoo 天王寺動物園
- 34°39′09″N 135°30′31″E
- Date opened: January 1, 1915
- Location: Tennoji Park, 1-108, Chausuyama-cho, Tennōji-ku, Osaka, Japan
- No. of species: 230 (as of 2008)
- Public transit: JR West: at Tennōji; Osaka Metro: at Dōbutsuen-mae at Ebisuchō
- Website: www.tennojizoo.jp (in Japanese)

Tennōji Zoo (天王寺動物園) is a 11-hectare (27-acre) zoo located at Tennōji Park in Tennōji-ku, Osaka, Japan, opened on January 1, 1915. It is the third zoo to be built in Japan and is located southwest of the Shitennō-ji temple, the first Buddhist temple in Japan.

== History ==
In the late 1920s, Tennōji Zoo acquired a chimapanzee, Torō, who died of pneumonia after only a month at the zoo. In response, they sent animal collector Isamu Kagawa to Africa to get a replacement, called Rita. Rita and her mate, Lloyd, became very popular at the zoo and across Japan.

== Attractions and Animals ==
=== African Savanna Zone ===
African Savanna

The habitat features expansive habitats for African animals. These habitats are arranged so that predators like lions and hyenas appear to be sharing the same space with their prey.

- Common dwarf mongoose
- Common eland
- Eastern black rhinoceros
- Egyptian goose
- Grant's zebra
- Hippopotamus
- Lesser flamingo
- Lion
- Marabou stork
- Nile tilapia
- Reticulated giraffe
- Rock hyrax
- Spotted hyena

IFAR Reptile House

- American alligator
- Burmese python
- Chinese alligator
- Gila monster
- Japanese giant salamander
- Alligator snapping turtle
- Asian water monitor
- Nile monitor
- Radiated tortoise
- Japanese pond turtle

Other animals

- Andean condor
- Amur tiger
- Jaguar
- Japanese golden eagle
- Mongolian wolf
- Red panda
- Japanese red fox

=== Elephant Village and Friendship Garden ===
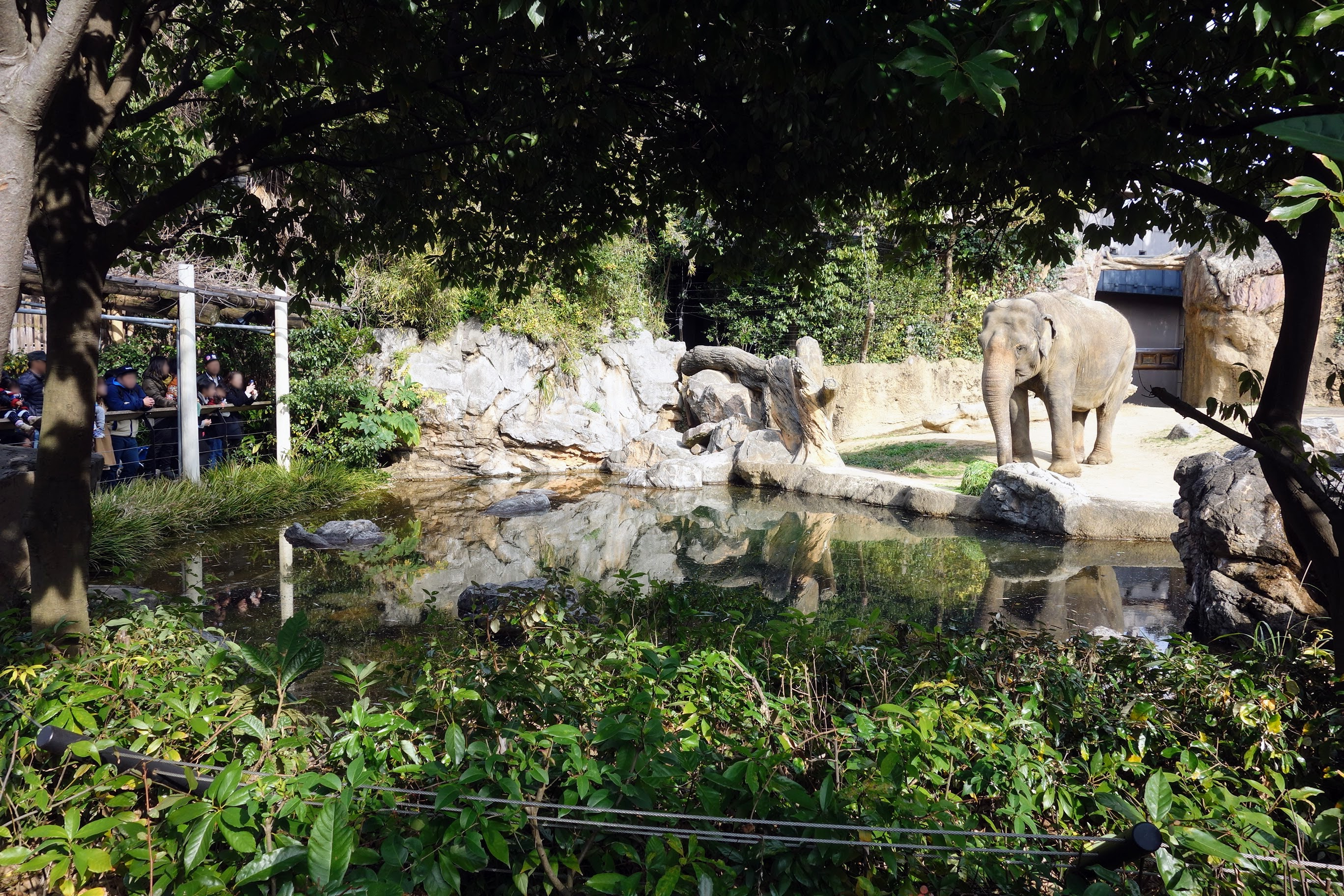
Asian elephant (2016)

Elephant Village

Former name was Asian Tropical Rainforest Zone. Themed after a Southeast Asian rainforest, this zone formerly housed Asian elephants, the last of which, a female named Hiroko died in 2018. The Tennōji Zoo expanded the Asian elephant habitat, and introduced three elephants from Malaysia. Reopened elephant exhibit on April 21st,2026, Asian Tropical Rainforest Zone is renamed as "Elephant Village".

- Asian elephant

Friendship Garden

Established in April 2022, visitors are allowed to interact with domestic animals.

- Goat
- Guinea pig
- Noma horse
- Sheep
- Alpaca

Nocturnal House

The zoo is the only zoo in Japan to house kiwis. In 2024, concerns were raised over the suitability of the kiwi enclosure.

- Egyptian fruit bat
- Japanese raccoon dog
- North Island brown kiwi

Southern Hemisphere House

- Emu
- Aldabra giant tortoise
- Patagonian mara

Chimpanzee Base

Opened in spring 2025

- Chimpanzee

Monkey and Baboon House

- Black-and-white ruffed lemur
- De Brazza's monkey
- Drill
- François' langur
- Grivet
- Lion-tailed macaque
- Siamang
- Tufted capuchin

=== World of Birds and Surrounding Area ===
Crane House

- Demoiselle crane
- Grey crowned crane
- Hooded crane
- Red-crowned crane

World of Birds

Opened on November 21, 2023.

- Edwards's pheasant
- Pink and grey cockatoo
- Helmeted guineafowl
- Guineafowl
- Laughing kookaburra
- Satyr tragopan
- Temminck's tragopan
- Green pheasant
- Palawan peacock-pheasant
- Snowy owl
- Mallard
- Mandarin duck
- Eastern spot-billed duck
- Japanese night heron
- Spectacled owl

Other

- American flamingo
- Chilean flamingo
- Oriental stork
- White cockatoo

=== Marine Animal Zone and Surrounding Area ===
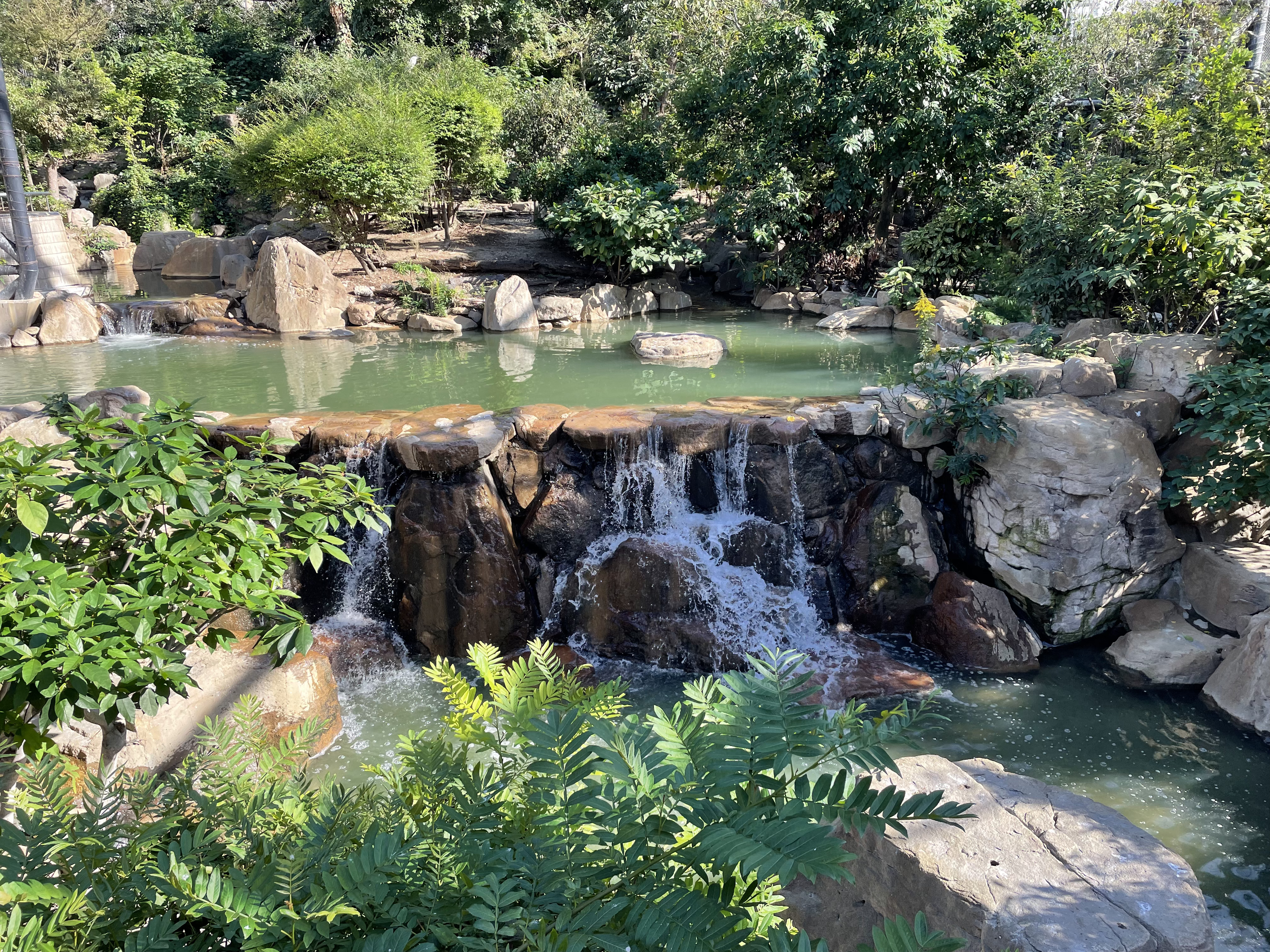
Waterfall in the Tennōji Zoo Aviary

Marine Animal Zone

Marine Animal Zone consists of 2 exhibits, "Penguin Park & Sea Lion Wharf" and "Polar bear Coast". Penguin and sealion exhibit opened on April 26, 2023, and brand new polar bear exhibit opened on August 4th, 2026.

- California sea lion
- Humboldt penguin
- Polar bear

Flight Aviary

Home to free-flying waterbirds, the aviary has springs, dams, streams and forest, recreating a natural environment.

- Eastern spot-billed duck
- Little egret
- Mallard
- Mandarin duck
- White stork

Bear House

- Sun bear

== Gallery ==
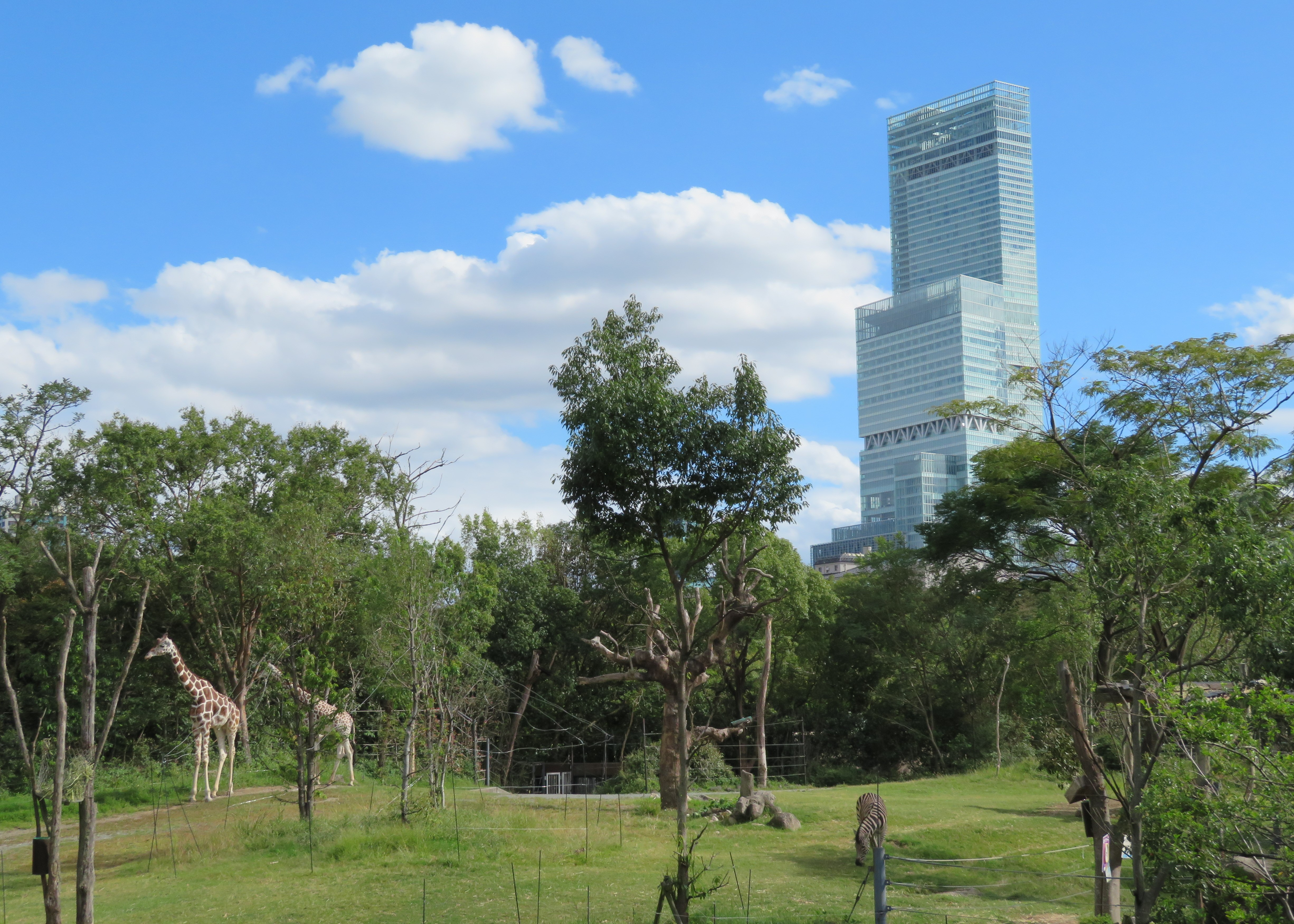
Reticulated giraffe

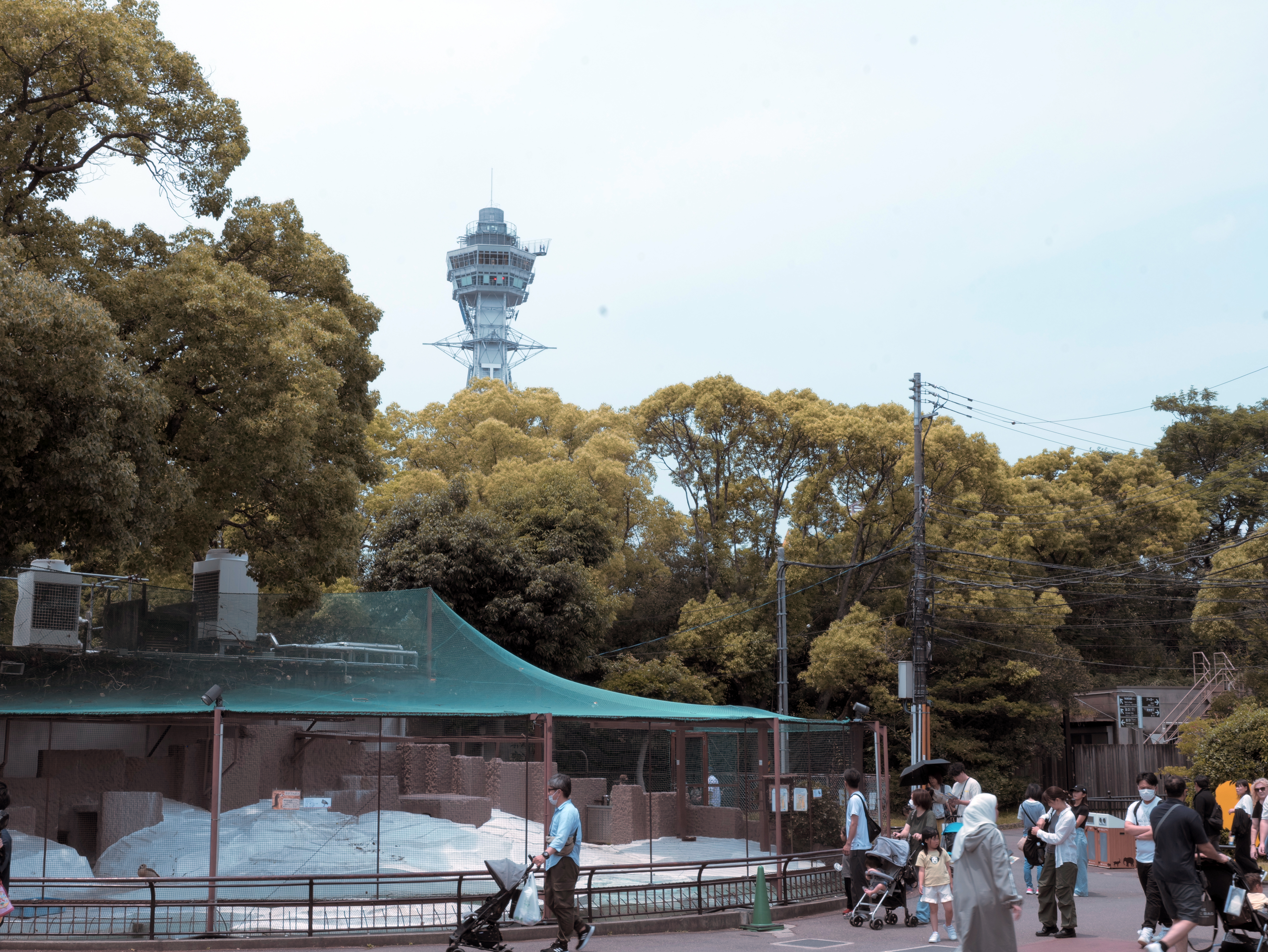
Tsutenkaku Tower as seen from Tennoji Zoo

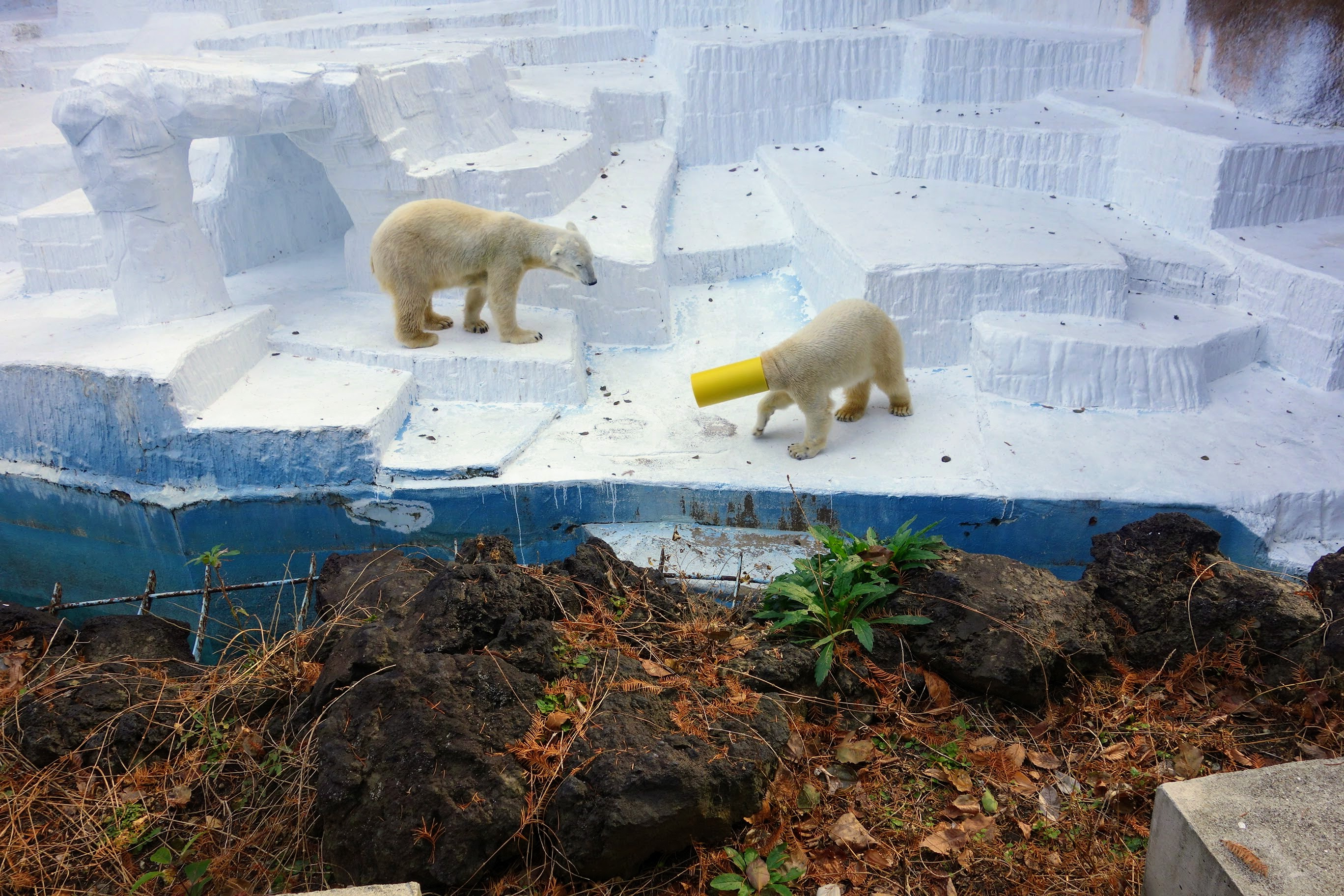
A polar bear cub playing on a cylindrical play structure (2016)

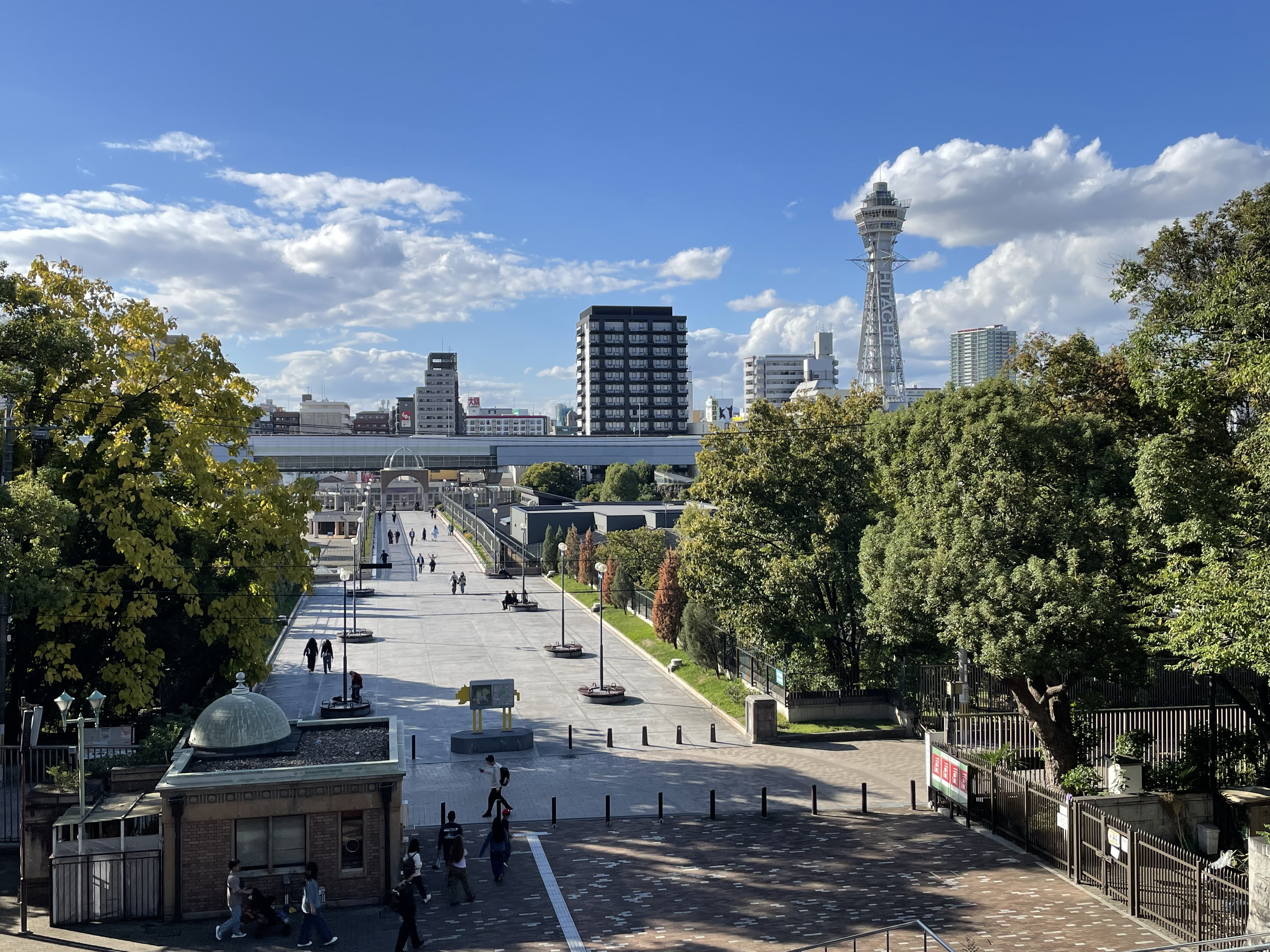
View of Tennōji Zoo from nearby park

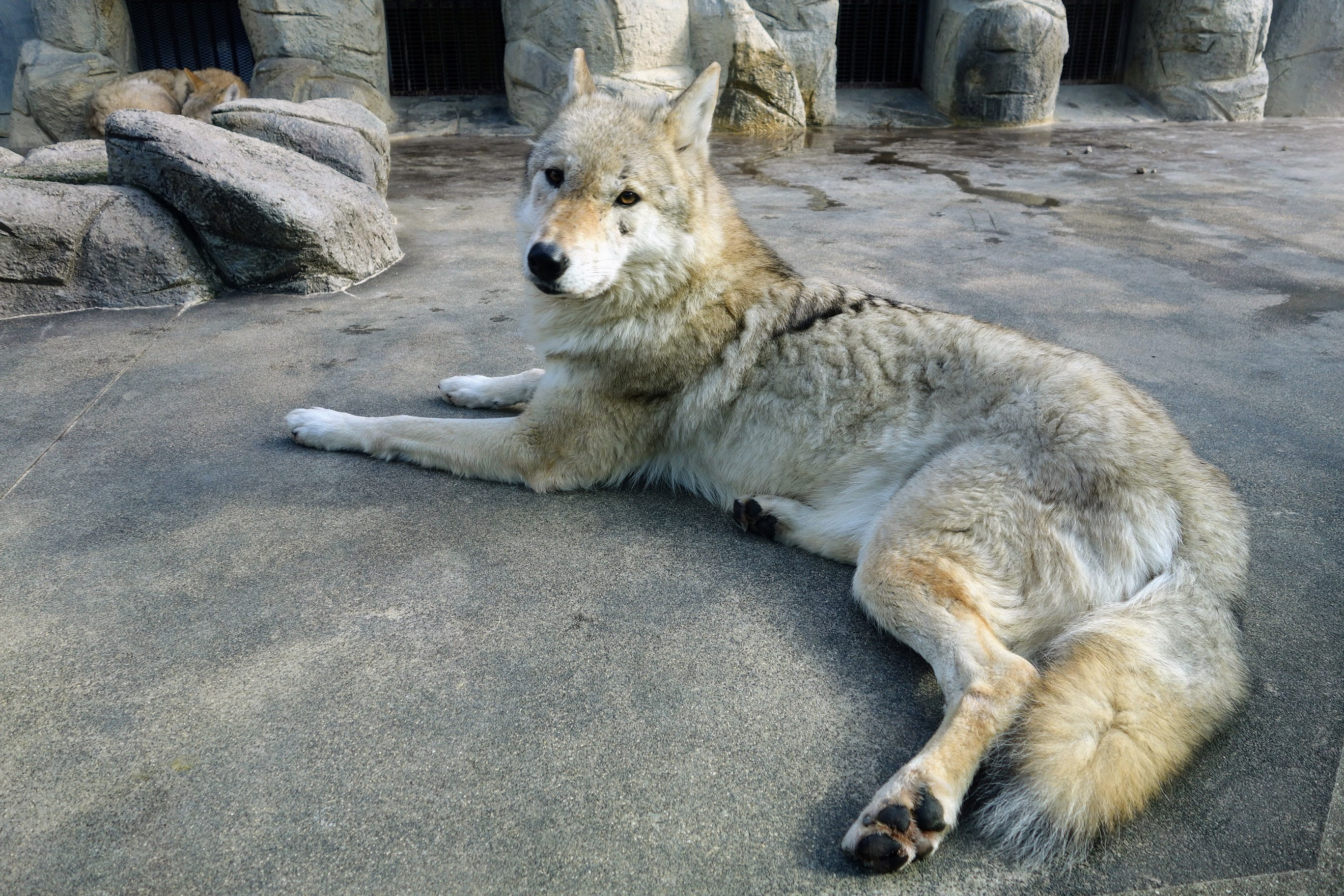
Chinese wolf

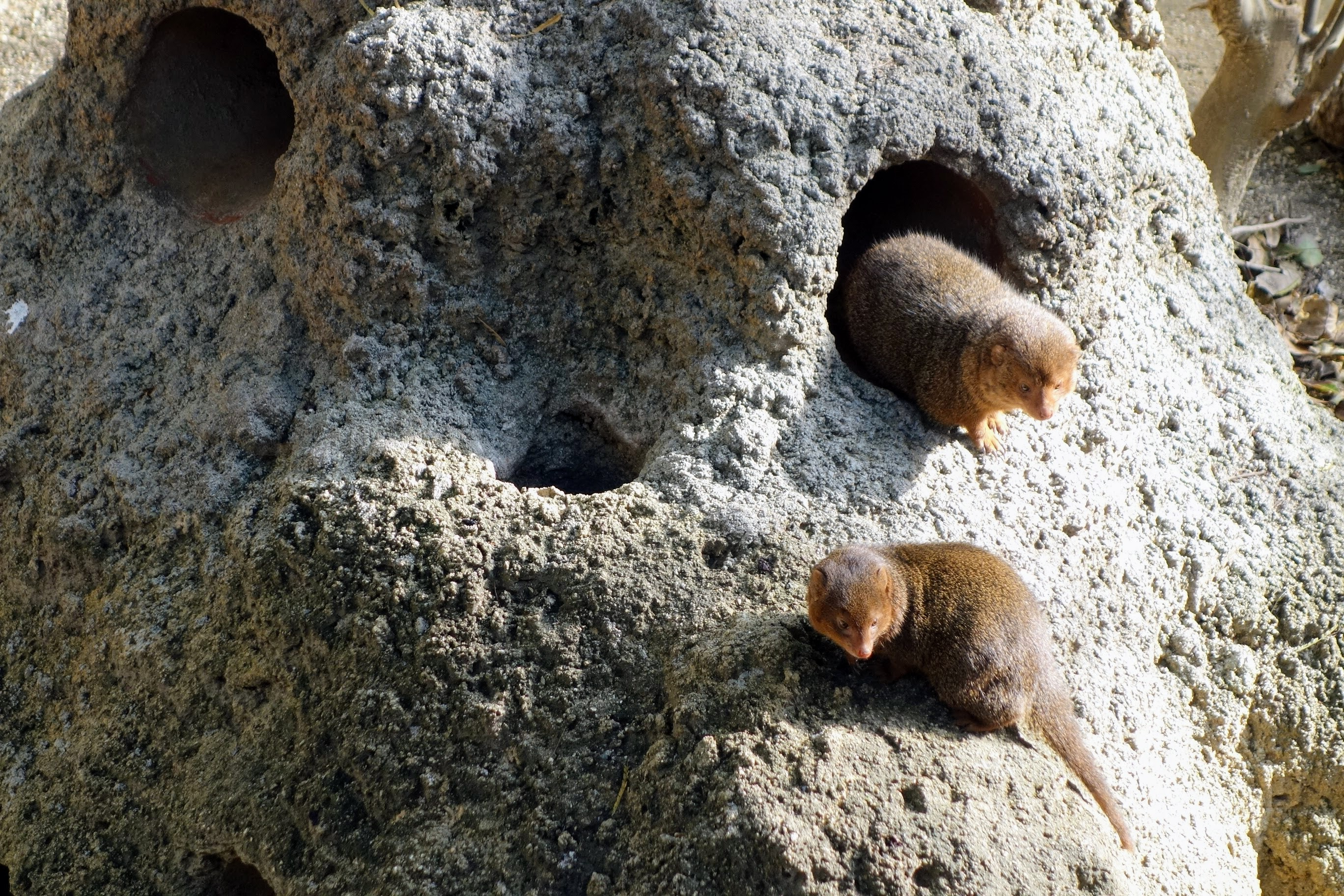
Dwarf mongooses

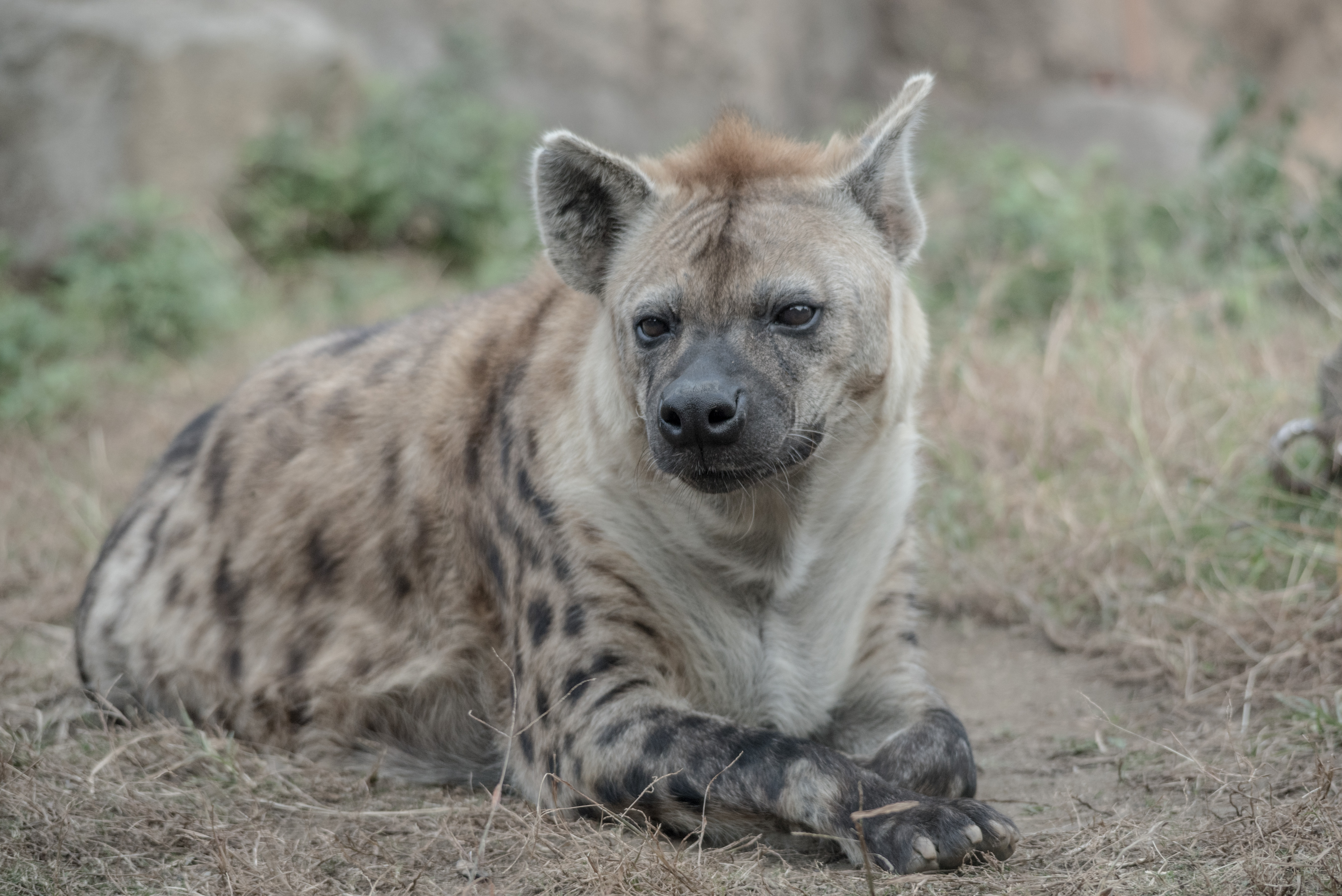
Spotted Hyena

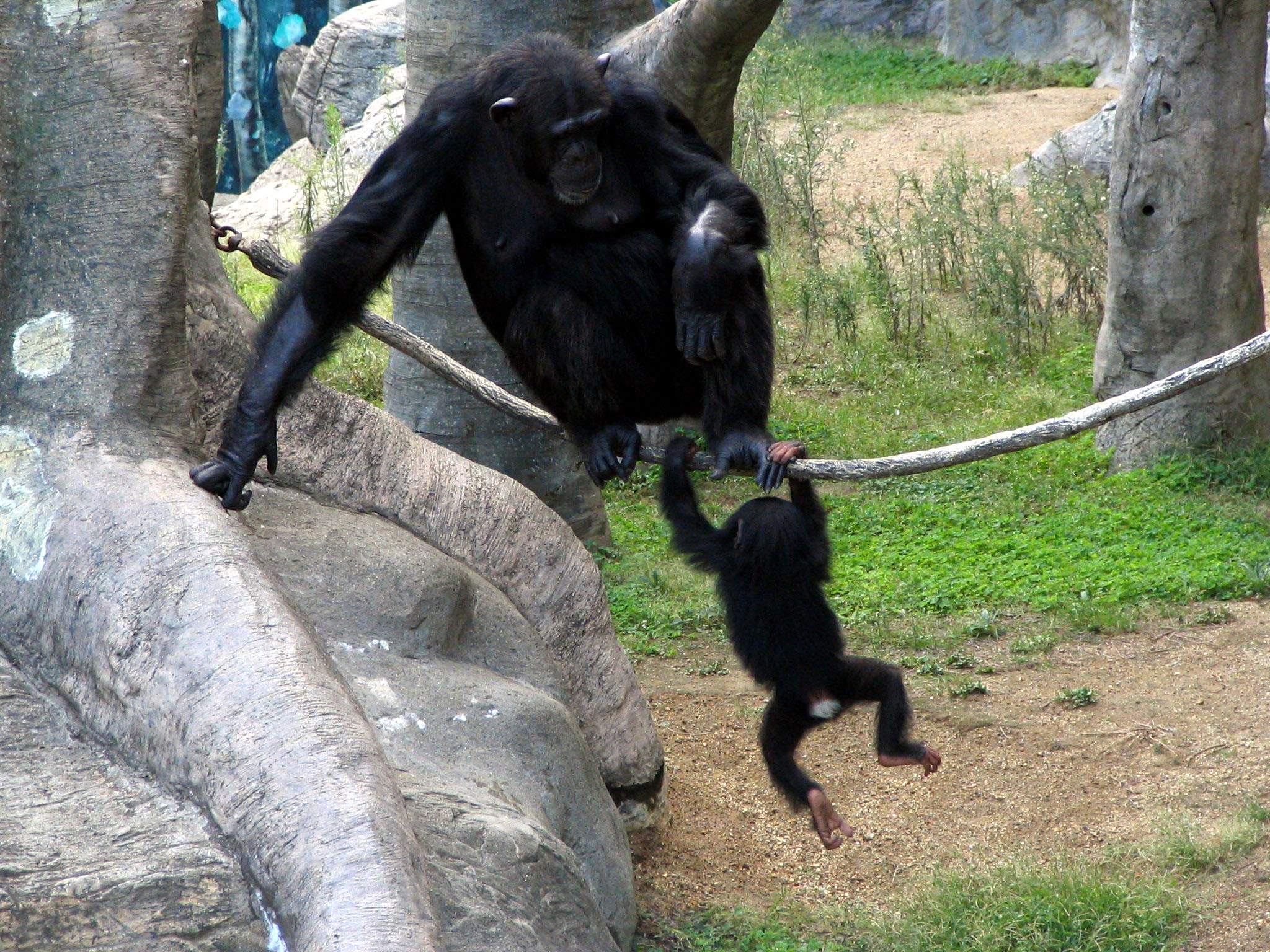
Chimpanzee

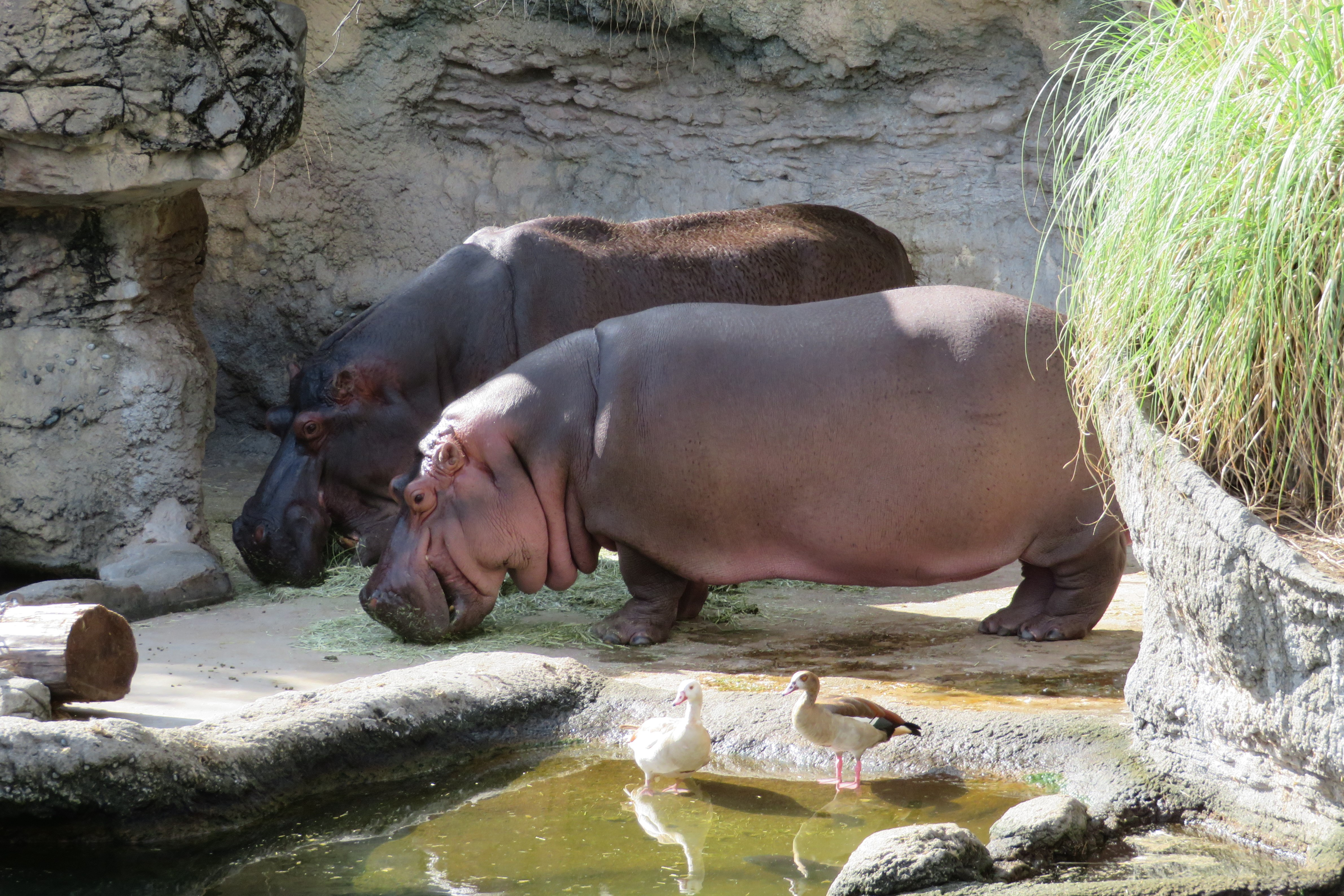
Hippo

== Access ==
- Osaka Municipal Subway Midosuji Line: Dobutsuen-mae Station
- Osaka Municipal Subway Sakaisuji Line: Ebisucho Station
- JR West, Osaka Municipal Subway: Tennoji Station
- JR West, Nankai Railway: Shin-Imamiya Station
- Hankai Tramway Hankai Line: Minami-Kasumicho Station
- Kintetsu Minami Osaka Line: Osaka Abenobashi Station
- Osaka City Bus: Dobutsuen-mae, Tennoji-koen-mae (Shinsekai Gate), Abenobashi (Tennoji Gate)
