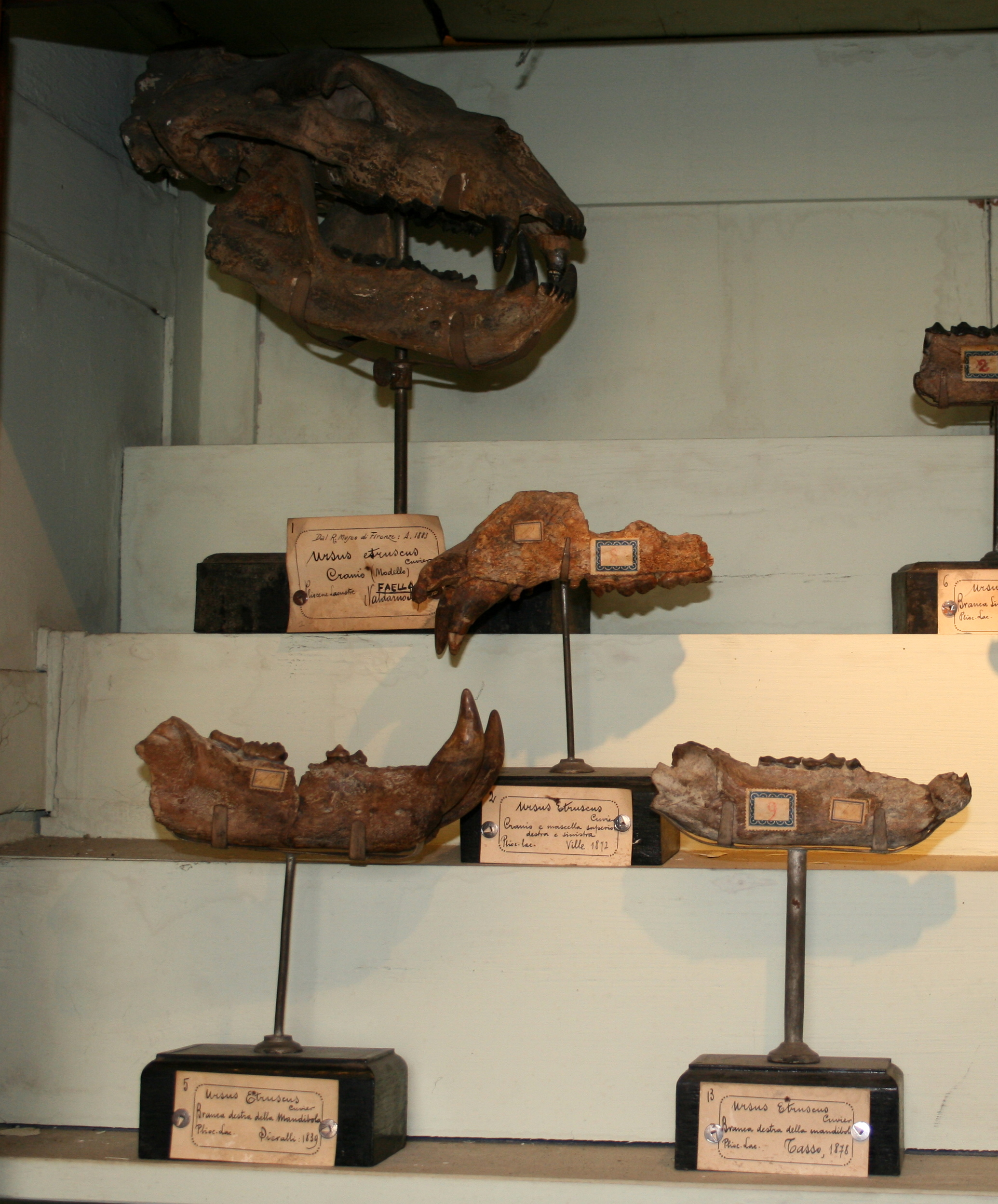
- Fossils

Scientific classification
- Kingdom: Animalia
- Phylum: Chordata
- Class: Mammalia
- Order: Carnivora
- Family: Ursidae
- Genus: Ursus
- Species: †U. etruscus

Binomial name
- †Ursus etruscus Cuvier, 1823

= Ursus etruscus =

Ursus etruscus Temporal range: Early Pleistocene

Extinct species of carnivore

Ursus etruscus, the Etruscan bear, is an extinct bear species that was native to Eurasia and North Africa during the Early Pleistocene, living from approximately 2.2 million to around 1.4–1.2 million years ago. It is widely thought to be the ancestor of the living brown bear (Ursus arctos) and the extinct cave bears.

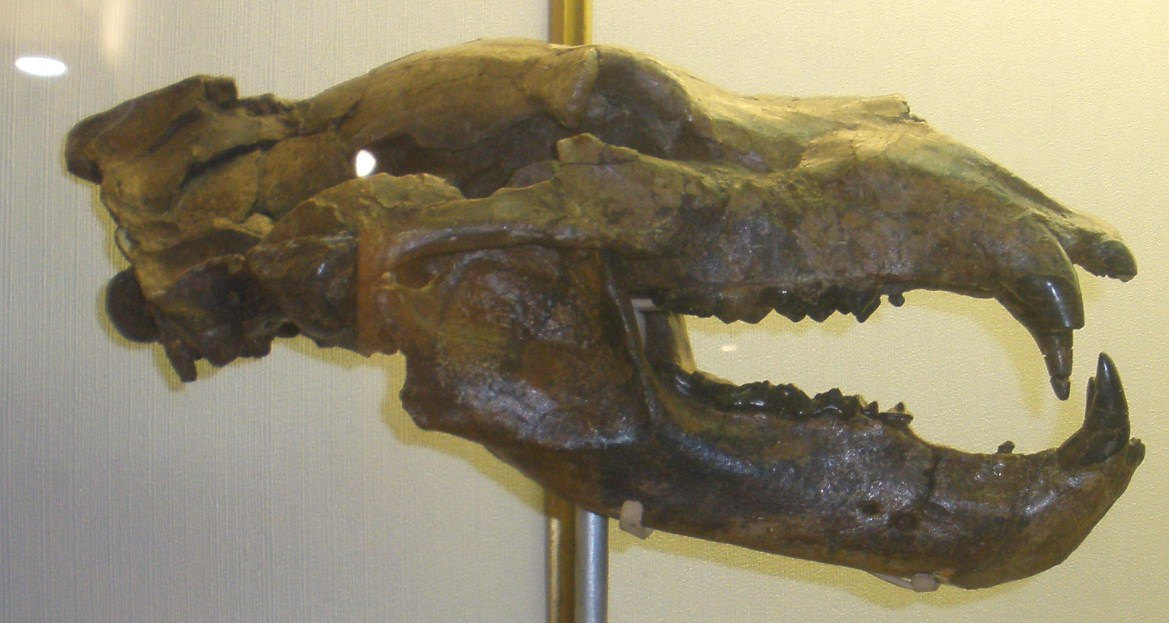
Skull

== Taxonomy ==
The Etruscan bear appears to have originated from Ursus minimus and gave rise to the modern brown bear (Ursus arctos) and the extinct cave bear (Ursus spelaeus). The range of Etruscan bears was mostly limited to continental Europe, with specimens also recovered in the Great Steppe region of Eurasia. Fossil evidence for the Etruscan bear has been recovered in Palestine, Greece, Montenegro, Croatia, Tuscany, Italy, and Spain.

Some scientists have proposed that the early, smaller variety of U. etruscus from the middle Villafranchian era is the ancestor of the modern Asian black bear.

== Description ==
Ursus etruscus was similar in size to a living brown bear. Ursus etruscus differs from other species of Ursus primarily in dental characters. Unlike cave bears, U. etruscus always has a complete set of three frontmost lower premolars. The lower fourth premolar of U. etruscus is characteristically "oval shape in occlusal [top-down] view, with no additional cusps, except for a tiny cusp on the posterior cristid of the protoconid" the lower first molar is typified by "metaconid (unicuspid) and entoconid (unicuspid) ... additional cusps and cristids are absent between the metaconid and entoconid".

== Ecology ==
Like modern brown bears, Ursus etruscus was likely omnivorous, with some populations possibly relying heavily on fish.

== Fossil distribution ==
Sites and specimen ages:

- Vassiloudi, Macedonia Greece ~1.8 Ma.
- Obigarm, Tajikistan ~1.8 Ma.
- Pardines, Auvergne, France ~2.5–1.8 Ma.
- Dmanisi, Georgia ~1.8–0.8 Ma.
- Mestas de Con, Cangas de Onis, Asturias, Spain ~1.8–0.1 Ma.
- Strmica, Croatia ~1.8–0.1 Ma.
- Jinyuan Cave, China ~1.8-1.4Ma

Morphologically similar specimens described from Ahl al Oughlam, Morocco were referred to as U. cf. etruscus.
