= S. vulgaris =

S. vulgaris may refer to:

- Senecio vulgaris, a tenacious deciduous annual species
- Silene vulgaris, a plant species that looks like a bladder
- Strongylus vulgaris, a common horse parasite species
- Syringa vulgaris, an olive species
- Sturnus vulgaris, the scientific name for common starling

== See also ==
- Vulgaris (disambiguation)
