= Strongyloides westeri =

Scientific classification
- Kingdom: Animalia
- Phylum: Nematoda
- Class: Chromadorea
- Order: Rhabditida
- Family: Strongylidae
- Genus: Strongyloides
- Species: S. westeri

Binomial name
- Strongyloides westeri Ihle, 1917

Intestinal threadworms of foals

Strongyloides westeri, commonly referred to as intestinal threadworm, is a species of small nematode parasite in the family Strongylidae. Strongyloides (from Greek strongylos, round, + eidos, resemblance) are commonly found in the small intestine of mammals (generally horses and monkeys, specifically foals), that are characterized by an unusual lifecycle (Larvae II, III) that involves one generations of free-living adult worms.

They preferably infest foals, in which they cause diarrhea and dermatitis.

== Description ==
The species is a small thin hair-like nematode. The approximate size is between 8.0-9.0mm in length and 1.0mm thick. The infectious females are between 0,1 - 9.0 mm long. Their eggs are thin walled and oval. The eggs are approximately 40x30 μm to 50x40 μm small.

== Habitat ==
The species prefers a warm and moist environment and is most likely to infest horses and monkeys, and particularly the proximal small intestines of foals. Their eggs can be found in the feces of fouls which are younger than two months; larvae can be isolated in the milk of the mare from day five to day 45 postpartum; also can occur in liver, lungs and mammary tissue; Parasitic female of S. westeri can be found submucosa of anterior small intestine, in the lumen of intestine. Free living male S. westeri can occur in moist soil, sand, or sawdust with an acidic pH.

== Life cycle ==
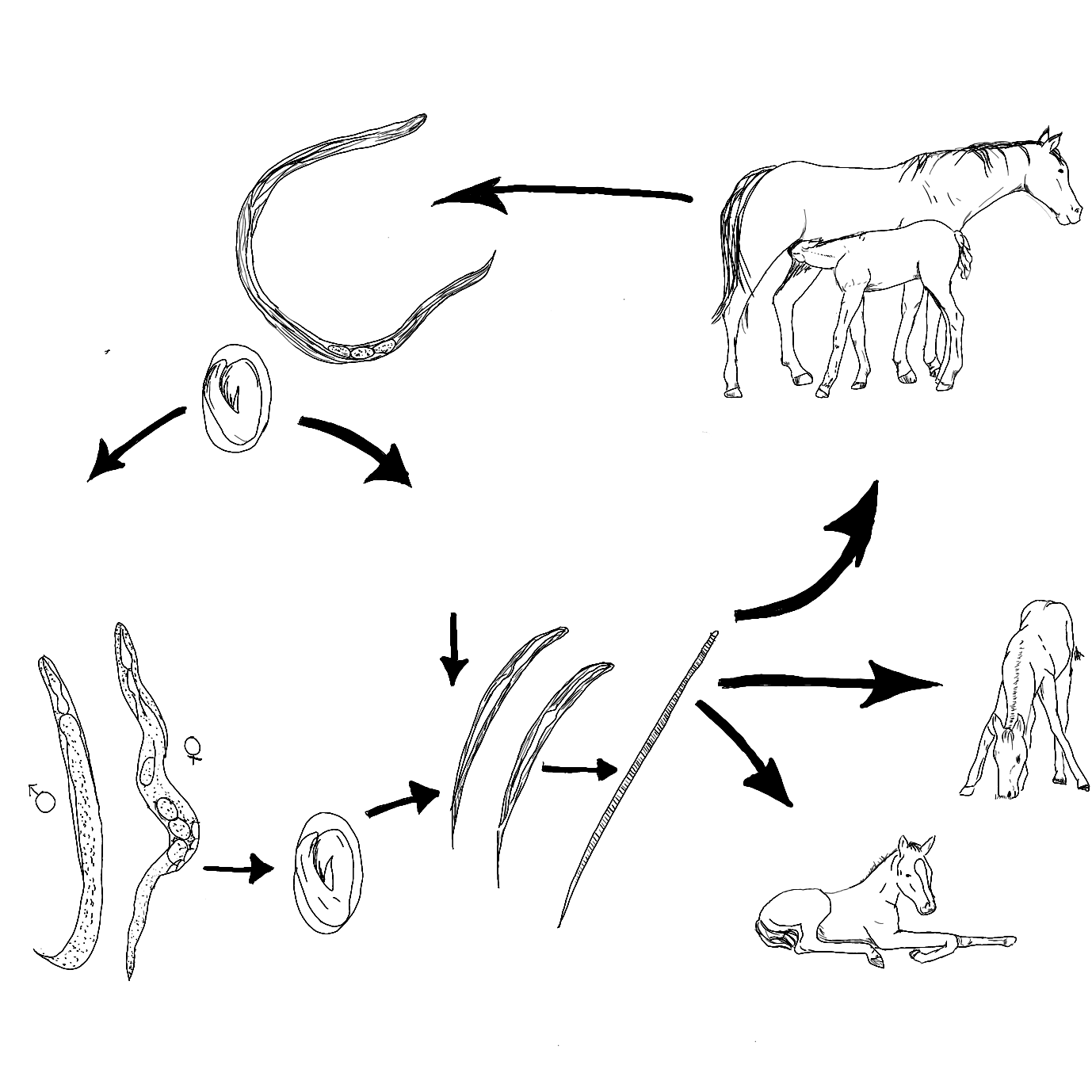
Life cycle

It is a representative of the Strongylidae family in equines, which occurs worldwide. This parasitosis is a typical disease for young animals, as the initial infection is mainly galactogenic. From the 80th day post partum onwards, a resistance is developed, so older animals would no longer contract the disease.

This is a typical parasitosis for stables, within the exogenous development of the larvae gets promoted through moist and warm environments.

Characteristic for the development of Strongyloides westeri is a generation transfer of its host.

The adult nematodes settle preferentially in the duodenum and jejunum and consist only of female worms, which reproduce parthenogenetically. Their eggs are excreted in the feces of the host animals, from which the rhabditiform larvae I hatch shortly. These can now either develop into the infectious larvae III via two moults, or develop into pre-sexual larvae, which become sexually mature animals and lay eggs exogenously. Then Larvae hatch from the eggs, which then develop into the infectious larvae III via two moults.

Larva III can survive without a host for up to 4 months and infect the host animals percutaneously. Within the initial infection, the nematode enters the lungs via the bloodstream and lymphatic pathways; from there it travels, due to coughing, through the trachea and pharynx into the digestive tract, where it colonises the small intestine within days. The prepatency of this tracheal migratory pathway is 9 days.

If the host animal is reinfected orally or percutaneously, it enters the mammary complex via the bloodstream and not the lungs. The mammary complex is considered the predilection site. The prepatency only takes 6 days. Reactivation of these larvae begins during pregnancy after which they are transferred to the foal via the colostrum.This excretion of the larvae within the mother's milk starts 2 to 4 days after foaling and lasts up to 7 weeks. Early infection treatments for foals can prevent the galaction infection altogether, but leads to disturbances in the development of their immunsystems. It also does not prevent the high risk of reinfection.

== Symptoms ==
Strongyloides westeri commonly infect young foals, they are associated with small intestine enteritis resulting in diarrhea, the diarrhea could also be a result of intestinal pathogens. The diarrhea causes denuding of hair in the perianal area due to irritation caused by wet liquid feces. When infected percutaneously, skin infections, like dermatitis, and reactions resulting in itching and hyperactiveness are observed, in older foals swelling of the lower hind limb can occur. Foals may become emaciated, listless, and dehydrated from enteritis when heavily infected.

Coughing is only a short term effect during the migration of the S. westeri from the lung to the digestive system, the infection of the lung can result in excessive production of mucus or pneumonia.

== Prevention and treatment ==
Deworming the mare during the last weeks of the pregnancy is an attempt to minimize lactogenic transmission, without full effectiveness. Another prevention attempt is environmental hygiene like removal of foal feces and usage of chemicals to keep the environment from getting too acidic, so that percutaneous transmission is reduced. On breeding farms foals are often dewormed at about two weeks of age, so that clinical diseases are avoided.

There are only two marketed equine anthelmintics with an efficacy against S. westeri. The two medications are called Oxibendazole and Ivermectin and both are used orally; for the treatment with Oxibendazole a dose of 15 milligram per one kilogram body weight is needed; a smaller dose of Ivermectin is needed only two milligram per one kilogram body weight.
