= Cylicocyclus nassatus =

Scientific classification
- Kingdom: Animalia
- Phylum: Nematoda
- Class: Chromadorea
- Order: Rhabditida
- Family: Strongylidae
- Genus: Cylicocyclus
- Species: C. nassatus

Binomial name
- Cylicocyclus nassatus Looss, 1900

Species of roundworm

Cylicocyclus nassatus is a very common species of cyathostomin, which are important intestinal parasites of horses. Cyathostomins, including C. nassatus, are nematodes.
