= Gulae =

Gulae may refer to:

- Porphyromonas gulae, species of bacteria
- Strongyloides gulae, species of parasitic roundworm
