= Strongyloides lutrae =

Scientific classification
- Domain: Eukaryota
- Kingdom: Animalia
- Phylum: Nematoda
- Class: Chromadorea
- Order: Rhabditida
- Family: Strongylidae
- Genus: Strongyloides
- Species: S. lutrae

Binomial name
- Strongyloides lutrae Little, 1966

Species of roundworm

Strongyloides lutrae is a parasitic roundworm infecting the small intestine of the otter, Lutra canadensis. It was first described from Louisiana.
