= Strongyloides ardeae =

Scientific classification
- Domain: Eukaryota
- Kingdom: Animalia
- Phylum: Nematoda
- Class: Chromadorea
- Order: Rhabditida
- Family: Strongylidae
- Genus: Strongyloides
- Species: S. ardeae

Binomial name
- Strongyloides ardeae Little, 1966

Species of roundworm

Strongyloides ardeae is a parasitic roundworm infecting the small intestine of yellow-crowned night heron, Nyctanassa violacea, and eastern green heron, Butorides virescens. It was first described from Louisiana.
