= Strongyloides procyonis =

Scientific classification
- Kingdom: Animalia
- Phylum: Nematoda
- Class: Chromadorea
- Order: Rhabditida
- Family: Strongylidae
- Genus: Strongyloides
- Species: S. procyonis

Binomial name
- Strongyloides procyonis Little, 1966

Species of roundworm

Strongyloides procyonis is a parasitic roundworm infecting the small intestine of the raccoon, Procyon lotor, hence its name. It was first described from Louisiana. It is morphologically similar to S. stercoralis, and as such infections of S. procyonis in humans, dogs, and other animals might be mistaken for the former.
