= Strongyloides physali =

Scientific classification
- Domain: Eukaryota
- Kingdom: Animalia
- Phylum: Nematoda
- Class: Chromadorea
- Order: Rhabditida
- Family: Strongylidae
- Genus: Strongyloides
- Species: S. physali

Binomial name
- Strongyloides physali Little, 1966

Species of roundworm

Strongyloides physali is a parasitic roundworm infecting the large intestine of the Gulf Coast toad. It was first described from Louisiana.
