= Strongyloides serpentis =

Scientific classification
- Domain: Eukaryota
- Kingdom: Animalia
- Phylum: Nematoda
- Class: Chromadorea
- Order: Rhabditida
- Family: Strongylidae
- Genus: Strongyloides
- Species: S. serpentis

Binomial name
- Strongyloides serpentis Little, 1966

Species of roundworm

Strongyloides serpentis is a parasitic roundworm infecting the intestine of the green water snake, hence its name. It was first described from Louisiana.
