= Cosmic Hunt =

Stories about animal pursued by hunters, wounded, and transformed into a constellation

The Cosmic Hunt is an ancient and widely distributed family of cognate myths. The story involves a large animal pursued by hunters; the animal is wounded and transformed into a constellation. Variants of the Cosmic Hunt are common in cultures of Northern Eurasia and the Americas, and include the story of Callisto in classical sources. The prey animal is either a bear or an ungulate, and the associated constellation involves the four stars of the bowl in the Big Dipper asterism of Ursa Major. In some variants blood or grease may fall from the wounded animal; in an Iroquois version the blood causes leaves to change color in autumn. Sometimes the hunters are also placed in the firmament, represented by the stars of the Big Dipper's handle.

The original prototype of the myth likely originated over 15,000 years ago, and diffused across the Bering land bridge. It has been suggested to provide evidence for punctuated equilibrium as a system for myth evolution.
