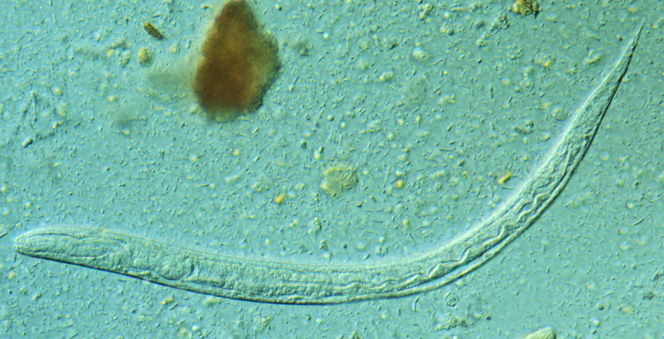
- First stage larva (L1) of S. stercoralis

Scientific classification
- Kingdom: Animalia
- Phylum: Nematoda
- Class: Chromadorea
- Order: Rhabditida
- Family: Strongylidae
- Genus: Strongyloides

Species
- Strongyloides akbari; Strongyloides ardeae; Strongyloides callosciureus; Strongyloides cebus; Strongyloides dasypodis; Strongyloides fuelleborni; Strongyloides gulae; Strongyloides lutrae; Strongyloides mirzai; Strongyloides myopotami; Strongyloides ophidiae; Strongyloides papillosus; Strongyloides planiceps; Strongyloides physali; Strongyloides procyonis; Strongyloides ransomi; Strongyloides ratti; Strongyloides robustus; Strongyloides serpentis; Strongyloides stercoralis; Strongyloides suis; Strongyloides venezuelensis; Strongyloides vituli; Strongyloides westeri

= Strongyloides =

Threadworm

Genus of roundworms

Strongyloides (from Greek strongylos, round, + eidos, resemblance), anguillula, or threadworm is a genus of small nematode parasites, belonging to the family Strongyloididae, commonly found in the small intestine of mammals (particularly ruminants), that are characterized by an unusual lifecycle that involves one or several generations of free-living adult worms.

Human infection, strongyloidiasis, is caused by

- Strongyloides stercoralis, widespread in all tropical regions
- Strongyloides fuelleborni, a parasite of primates in African and Asian tropics and of humans in African tropics and New Guinea
- Strongyloides papillosus, found in cattle, pigs, sheep, goats, rabbits, and rats
- Strongyloides ransomi, found in pigs
- Strongyloides ratti, found in rats
- Strongyloides myopotami, found in coypu (nutria), causes dermatitis similar to strongyloidiasis. The condition is also called nutria itch.

Treatment for strongyloides infection is ivermectin or thiabendazole.

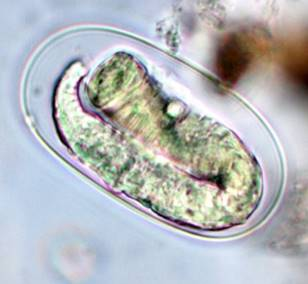
Egg of Strongyloides sp.
