= Strongyloides gulae =

Scientific classification
- Domain: Eukaryota
- Kingdom: Animalia
- Phylum: Nematoda
- Class: Chromadorea
- Order: Rhabditida
- Family: Strongylidae
- Genus: Strongyloides
- Species: S. gulae

Binomial name
- Strongyloides gulae Little, 1966

Species of roundworm

Strongyloides gulae is a parasitic roundworm infecting the esophagus of the green water snake, as well as eight other species of snakes. It was first described from Louisiana.
