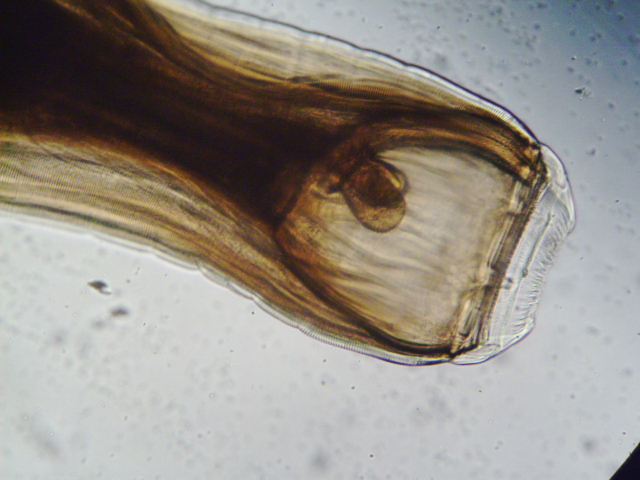
- Strongylus vulgaris

Scientific classification
- Kingdom: Animalia
- Phylum: Nematoda
- Class: Chromadorea
- Order: Rhabditida
- Family: Strongylidae
- Genus: Strongylus; Müller, 1780

= Strongylus (nematode) =

Genus of roundworms

Strongylus is a genus of nematodes belonging to the family Strongylidae.

The genus has cosmopolitan distribution.

Species:

- Strongylus edentatus (Looss, 1900)
- Strongylus equinus Müller, 1780
- Strongylus vulgaris (Looss, 1900)
