= Cylicocyclus =

Scientific classification
- Kingdom: Animalia
- Phylum: Nematoda
- Class: Chromadorea
- Order: Rhabditida
- Family: Strongylidae
- Subfamily: Cyathostominae
- Genus: Cylicocyclus; Ihle, 1922

Genus of worms

Cylicocyclus is a genus of nematodes belonging to the family Strongylidae.

The genus has cosmopolitan distribution.

== Species ==
Species:

- Cycliocyclus insigne (Boulenger, 1917)
- Cycliocyclus leptosomatum
- Cylicocyclus nassatus (Looss, 1900)
