= Ursid hybrid =

Bear hybrids

Possible hybridisation between different species of bear

An ursid hybrid is an animal with parents from two different species or subspecies of the bear family (Ursidae). Species and subspecies of bear known to have produced offspring with another bear species or subspecies include American black bears, grizzly bears, and polar bears, all of which are members of the genus Ursus. Bears not included in Ursus, such as the giant panda, are expected to be unable to produce hybrids with other bears. The giant panda bear belongs to the genus Ailuropoda.

A recent study found genetic evidence of multiple instances and species combinations where genetic material has passed the species boundary in bears (a process called introgression by geneticists). Specifically, species with evidence of past intermingling were (1) brown bear and American black bear, (2) brown bear and polar bear, (3) American black bear and Asian black bear. Overall, this study shows that evolution in the bear family (Ursidae) has not been strictly bifurcating, but instead showed complex evolutionary relationships.

All the Ursinae species (i.e., all bears except the giant panda and the spectacled bear) appear able to crossbreed.

== Brown × black bear hybrids ==
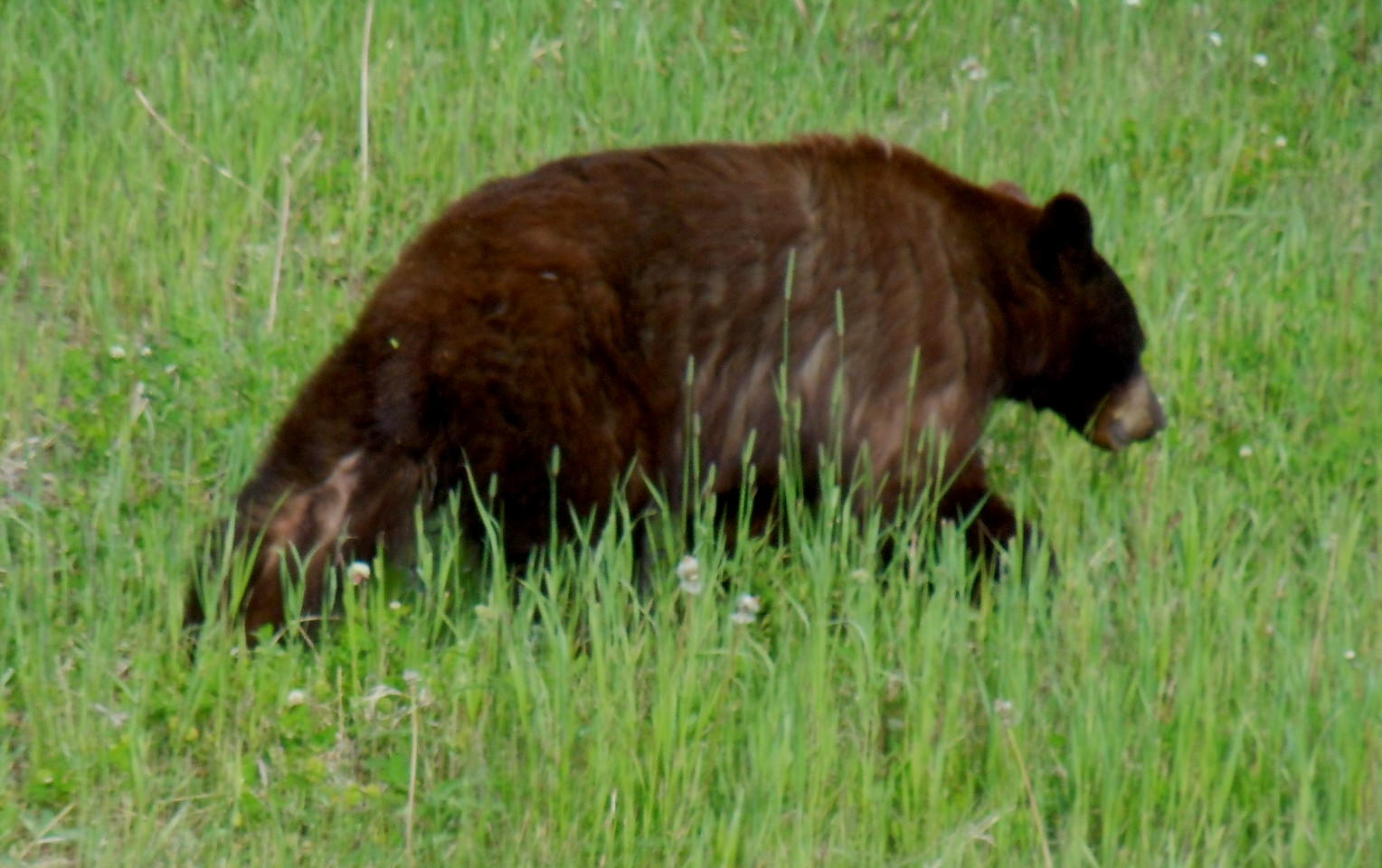
Possible grizzly-black bear hybrid in Yukon Territory, Canada

In 1859, a black bear and a European brown bear were bred together in the London Zoological Gardens, but the three cubs did not reach maturity. In The Variation of Animals and Plants Under Domestication Darwin noted:

In the nine-year Report it is stated that the bears had been seen in the Zoological Gardens to couple freely, but previously to 1848 most had rarely conceived. In the Reports published since this date three species have produced young (hybrids in one case), ...

A bear shot in autumn 1986 in Alaska was thought by some to be a grizzly × black bear hybrid, due to its unusually large size and its proportionately larger braincase and skull. DNA testing was unable to determine whether it was a large American black bear or a grizzly bear.

== Intercontinental brown bear hybrids ==
Although Eurasian brown bears and North American Brown bears are isolated, they are listed as a single species, so technically mating between the two sub-species is not hybridization, even though it cannot possibly occur in the wild. However, cross-breeding between the European brown bear and the North American grizzly bear has occurred in Cologne, Germany.

== Brown × polar bear hybrids ==
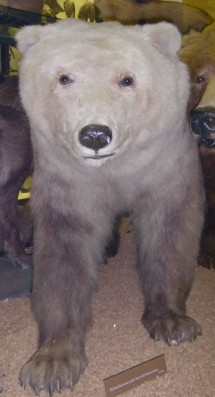
Polar/brown bear hybrid, Rothschild Museum, Tring

- Since 1874, at Halle, a series of successful matings of polar and brown bears were made. Some of the hybrid offspring were exhibited by the London Zoological Society. The Halle hybrid bears proved to be fertile, both with one of the parent species and with one another. Polar × brown bear hybrids are white at birth but later turn blue-brown or yellow-white.
- An adult polar × brown bear hybrid bred in the 19th century is now displayed at the Rothschild Zoological Museum, Tring, England
- Crandall reported the first polar × brown bear crosses as occurring at a small zoo in Stuttgart, Germany in 1876 rather than Halle in 1874. A female European brown bear mated with a male polar bear resulting in twin cubs in 1876. Three further births were recorded. The young were fertile among themselves and when mated back to European brown bears and to polar bears.
- DNA studies indicate that the ABC Islands bears have mixed brown and polar bear ancestry.
- Irish bears were intermediate between the modern brown bear and modern polar bear. This suggests that the Irish bear interbred with archaic polar bears during the Pleistocene. The Irish bear is believed to have died out circa 1000–500 BC, due to habitat loss and hunting.

=== Kodiak × polar bear hybrids ===
"Kodiak" or "Kodiak brown" is a term now applied to brown bears found in coastal regions of North America. In the far north, these bears feed on salmon and often attain especially large size. "Alaskan brown" is sometimes used for Alaskan bears, but the main distinction is how far the bear is found from the coast. "Grizzly bear" is the term used for the brown bear of the North American interior.

- In 1936, a male polar bear accidentally got into an enclosure with a female Kodiak (Alaskan brown) bear at the U.S. National Zoo, resulting in three hybrid offspring. The hybrid offspring were fertile and able to breed successfully with each other, indicating that the two species of bear are closely related. The Kodiak is also considered by many to be a variant or subspecies of the basic Arctic brown bear.
- In 1943, Clara Helgason described a bear shot by hunters during her childhood. This was a large, off-white bear with hair all over his paws. The presence of hair on the bottom of the feet suggests it was not an unusually colored Kodiak brown bear, but a natural hybrid with a polar bear.
- In a 1970 National Geographic article Elizabeth C. Reed mentions being foster mother to 4 hybrid bear cubs from the National Zoological Park in Washington, where her husband was director.

=== Grizzly × polar bear hybrids ===
The grizzly bear is now regarded by most taxonomists as a variety of brown bear, Ursus arctos horribilis. Clinton Hart Merriam, taxonomist of grizzly bears, described an animal killed in 1864 at Rendezvous Lake, Barren Grounds, Canada as "buffy whitish" with a golden brown muzzle. This is considered to be a natural hybrid between a grizzly bear and polar bear. On 16 April 2006, a polar bear of unusual appearance was shot by a sports hunter on Banks Island in the Northwest Territories. DNA testing released 11 May 2006, proved the kill was a grizzly×polar bear hybrid. This is thought to be the first recorded case of interbreeding in the wild. The bear was proven to have a polar mother and a grizzly father. The DNA testing also spared the hunter the C$1000 fine for killing a grizzly bear, as well as the risk of being imprisoned for up to a year. The hunter had bought a license to hunt polar bears; he did not have a license to hunt grizzly at that time.

The animal had dark rings around its eyes, similar to a panda's, but not as wide. It also had remarkably long claws, a slight hump on its back, brown spots in its white coat, and a slightly indented face — the nasal "stop" between the eyes which polar bears lack. The guide leading the hunt, Roger Kuptana of Sachs Harbour in the Northwest Territories, was the first to note the oddities.

Several names were suggested for this specimen. The Idaho hunter who killed it, Jim Martell, suggested "polargrizz". The biologists of the Canadian Wildlife Service suggested "grolar" or "pizzly", as well as "nanulak", an elision of the Inuit nanuk (polar bear) and aklak (grizzly or brown bear). Both "grolar" and "pizzly" were used by the Canadian Broadcasting Corporation in widely distributed stories. Presently, though the mating seasons overlap, the polar bears' season begins slightly earlier than the grizzly bears'. A blog columnist for the Seattle Post-Intelligencer suggested that more hybrids may be seen as global warming progresses and alters normal mating periods. The Canadian Wildlife Service noted that grizzly-polar hybrids born of zoo matings have proven fertile.

Grizzly bears have been sighted in what is usually polar bear territory in the Western Arctic near the Beaufort Sea, Banks Island, Victoria Island, and Melville Island. A "light chocolate colored" bear, possibly a hybrid, is reported to have been seen with polar bears near Kugluktuk in western Nunavut.

== Asian black bear known or suspected hybrids ==
- In 1975, within Venezuela's "Las Delicias" Zoo, a female Asian black bear shared its enclosure with a spectacled bear, and produced several hybrid descendants.
- In 2005, a possible Asiatic black bear × sun bear hybrid cub was captured in the Mekong River watershed of eastern Cambodia. The bear's mane was relatively slight, forming a crest on each side of the neck, as is typical in sun bears and some black bears. The appearance of its face was intermediate between that of a sun bear and a black bear, though its ears and large stout canines closely resembled those of the sun bear. Overall, the hybrid resembled an Asiatic black bear with an unusually glossy fur and an unusual head.
- In 2010, a male hybrid between an Asiatic black bear and a brown bear named Emma was taken from a bile farm and into the Animals Asia Foundation's China Moon Bear Rescue.

== Sloth bear hybrids ==
- Hybrids between the sloth bear (Melursus ursinus) and the Asiatic black bear (Ursus thibetanus, or Selenarctos thibetanus) are known.
- Hybrids have also been produced between the sloth bear (Melursus ursinus) and Malayan sun bear (Helarctos malayanus) at Tama Zoo in Tokyo.
