= Cyathostomum =

Scientific classification
- Kingdom: Animalia
- Phylum: Nematoda
- Class: Chromadorea
- Order: Rhabditida
- Family: Strongylidae
- Genus: Cyathostomum; Molin, 1861

Genus of roundworms

Cyathostomum is a genus of nematodes belonging to the family Strongylidae.

The genus has cosmopolitan distribution.

Species:

- Cyathostomum alveatum Looss, 1900
- Cyathostomum catinatum Looss, 1900
- Cyathostomum paternatum (Yorke & Macfie, 1919)
- Cyathostomum spec Molin, 1861
- Cyathostomum tetracanthum (Mehlis, 1831)
