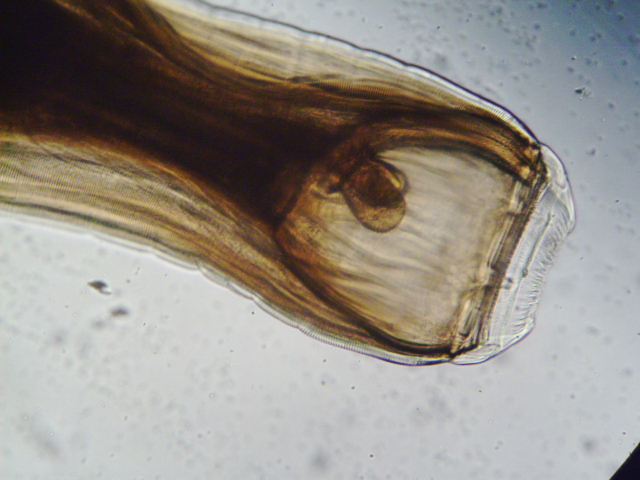
- Close-up of Strongylus vulgaris mouthparts

Scientific classification
- Kingdom: Animalia
- Phylum: Nematoda
- Class: Chromadorea
- Order: Rhabditida
- Family: Strongylidae
- Genus: Strongylus
- Species: S. vulgaris

Binomial name
- Strongylus vulgaris (Looss 1900)

= Strongylus vulgaris =

Species of roundworm

Strongylus vulgaris (large strongyles), commonly known as the blood worm, is a common horse parasite in the phylum Nematoda. It looks like a long worm with a large biting mouth. They are usually reddish in color because of all the blood they take from the equine host. This nematode is considered to be one of the "most pathogenic" of the large strongyles subphylum and is distributed worldwide, wherever there are grassland and temperate environments.

== Background information ==
During the infective stage of the S. vulgaris life cycle, the larvae that have matured in the intestinal tract of the horse will migrate into the surrounding blood vessels. Once in the blood vessels, the larvae will continue their migration throughout the body to various organs causing damage to the blood vessels along the way. This can cause anemia or blockage of blood flow caused by the detachment of blood clots from the vessel wall resulting in tissue death. S. vulgaris are commonly found in pastures and stalls where feces are present. The larvae crawl up on the grass which is where they are then eaten by the horse. Harsh environments, such as freezing, do not kill S. vulgaris.

== Clinical signs ==
Symptoms can range depending on how severe the infection is. In mild cases the most common clinical signs are weight loss, compromised performance, and a dull hair coat. Other clinical signs can range from diarrhea, weakness, anorexia, anemia if there are significant blood loss and abdominal discomfort. Severe cases can show signs of having severe colic, rupture of the intestines, and death. These signs may also be observed with other equine-related infections or illnesses and their presence alone should not be used to diagnose an infection of S. vulgaris. A veterinarian is required for further diagnosis when infection with S. vulgaris is suspected.

== Diagnosis ==
Large strongyle infections are commonly diagnosed through the observations of fecal samples. These fecal samples can be viewed under a microscope to identify the eggs of S. vulgaris. Diagnosis via egg identification is not enough to determine if the horse has a S. vulgaris infection as the fecal samples often contain a mixture of large and small strongyle eggs that are very similar in appearance. The best diagnostic method to determine if a horse has a S. vulgaris infection is through a fecal culture. Here the eggs grow and develop into the infective larval stage that is specific to the large strongyle parasite.

== Life cycle ==
The adults of S. vulgaris are primarily found in the cecum and colon of infected equids and it is here that the females will lay their eggs. These eggs will pass out of the horse's body in the feces. Once outside the body the eggs will hatch and develop into the infective larval stage L3. The larvae enter the host when the horse grazes a patch of grass containing the larval stage. Back inside the host the infective larval stage migrates to the small intestine where it can enter the intestinal mucosa and further develop into the L4 stage. It is this stage that can enter the blood vessels and migrate throughout the body for a period of up to six months. During this time the L4 stage matures into the L5 or immature adult stage before returning to the intestinal wall. The L5 stage resides primarily in the cecum and colon where the males and females copulate thus starting the cycle over again.

== Treatment ==
Dewormers that have ivermectin or moxidectin are the most effective against these parasites. Treating a horse with regular dewormer when they have the worms inside of them may cause the worms to migrate all at once, causing rupture of the intestines and lead to death. Recommendations for deworming horses include performing fecal egg counts to determine what kind of protection each individual horse requires and alternating products in the fall and spring. An example would be using ivermectin based products (Equell or Zimectrin) in the spring and moxidectin based products in combination with praziquantel (Quest Plus) in the fall or vice versa. A deworming schedule should be discussed with a veterinarian.

== Prevention ==
Horses are able to pick up this parasite from food and water contaminated by feces. This can be avoided by cleaning water tanks and picking out pastures often, avoidance of feeding on the ground, and avoidance of overstocking pastures. As foals can be extremely susceptible to this parasite, it is best to treat broodmares before they give birth and move them to uninfected pastures to avoid transfer.
