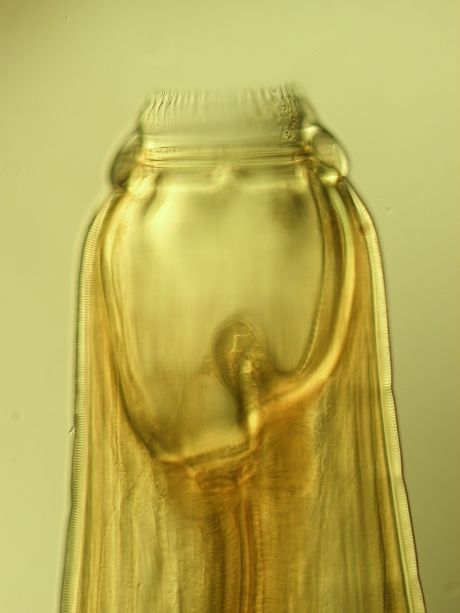
- Strongylus vulgaris

Scientific classification
- Domain: Eukaryota
- Kingdom: Animalia
- Phylum: Nematoda
- Class: Chromadorea
- Order: Rhabditida
- Superfamily: Strongyloidea
- Family: Strongylidae

Subfamilies
- Cyathostominae; Gyalocephalinae; Strongylinae

= Strongylidae =

Family of roundworms

Strongyles (from Greek strongulos 'round'), or alternatively, strongyls, are nematode worms of the family Strongylidae, order Strongylida. They are often parasitic in the gastrointestinal tract of mammals, especially grazers such as sheep, cattle, and horses.

== Genera ==
Genera:

- Alocostoma Mawson, 1979
- Bidentostomum Tshoijo, 1957
- Borania Ricci, 1939
- Caballonema Abuladze, 1937
- Chabertiella Tadros, 1964
- Chapiniella Yamaguti, 1961
- Choniangium Henry & Bauche, 1914
- Codiostomum Railliet & Henry, 1911
- Coronocyclus Hartwich, 1986
- Craterostomum Boulenger, 1920
- Crycophorus Chaves, 1930
- Cyathostomum Molin, 1861
- Cylicocyclus Ihle, 1922
- Cylicodontophorus Ihle, 1922
- Cylicostephanus Ihle, 1922
- Cylindropharynx Leiper, 1911
- Decrusia Lane, 1914
- Dicerocola Round, 1962
- Equinurbia Lane, 1914
- Eucyathostomum Molin, 1861
- Gyalocephalus Looss, 1900
- Hsiungia K'ung & Yang, 1964
- Hudsonia Leroux, 1940
- Hypodontus Mönnig, 1929
- Javellia Ricci, 1939
- Khalilia Neveu-Lemaire, 1924
- Kiluluma Skrjabin, 1916
- Macropicola Mawson, 1978
- Macropostrongyloides Yamaguti, 1961
- Maplestonema Johnston & Mawson, 1939
- Murshidia Lane, 1914
- Neomurshidia Chabaud, 1957
- Oesophagodontus Railliet & Henry, 1902
- Oesophagostomoides Schwartz, 1928
- Oesophagostomum Molin, 1861
- Paradoxostrongylus Özdikmen, 2010
- Paramacropostrongylus Johnson & Mawson, 1940
- Parapoteriostomum Hartwich, 1986
- Parastrongyloides Morgan, 1928
- Petrovinema Erschov, 1943
- Phascolostongylus
- Phascolostrongylus Canavan, 1931
- Poteriostomum Quiel, 1919
- Quilonia Lane, 1914
- Rhinocerotonema Jiang, Yin & Kung, 1986
- Sauricola Chapin, 1924
- Skladnikia Ricci, 1939
- Strongylus Müller, 1780
- Theileriana Monnig, 1924
- Tridentoinfundibulum Tschoijo, 1958
- Triodontophorus Looss, 1902
- Wuia K'ung, 1959
- Zebrincola Ricci, 1939
