= List of the Cenozoic life of Arizona =

This list of the Cenozoic life of Arizona contains the various prehistoric life-forms whose fossilized remains have been reported from within the US state of Arizona and are between 66 million and 10,000 years of age.

== A ==
- †Adelphailurus
  - †Adelphailurus kansensis
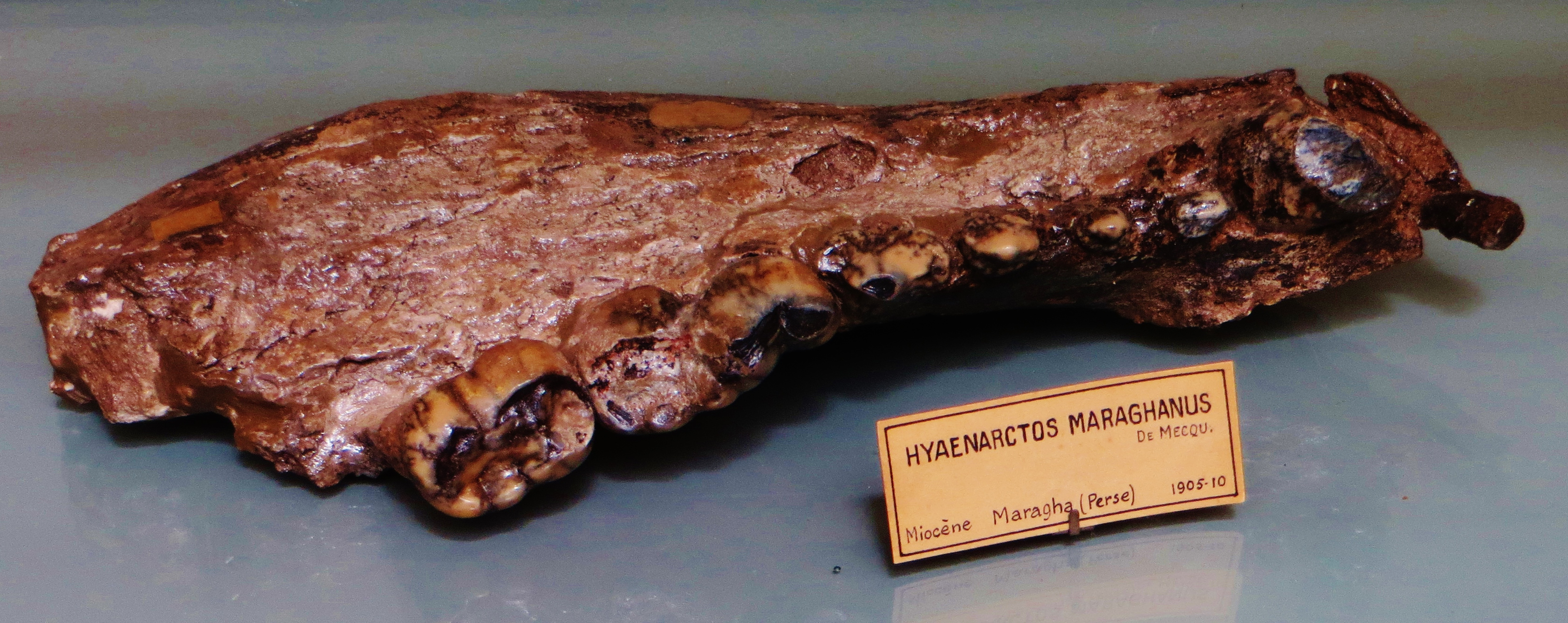
- Fossilized mandible of the Miocene-Pleistocene bear Agriotherium
  †Agriotherium
- †Alforjas
- †Alilepus
  - †Alilepus browni
  - †Alilepus wilsoni
- †Aluralagus
  - †Aluralagus bensonensis
  - †Aluralagus virginiae – type locality for species
- †Ambystoma
  - †Ambystoma tigrinum
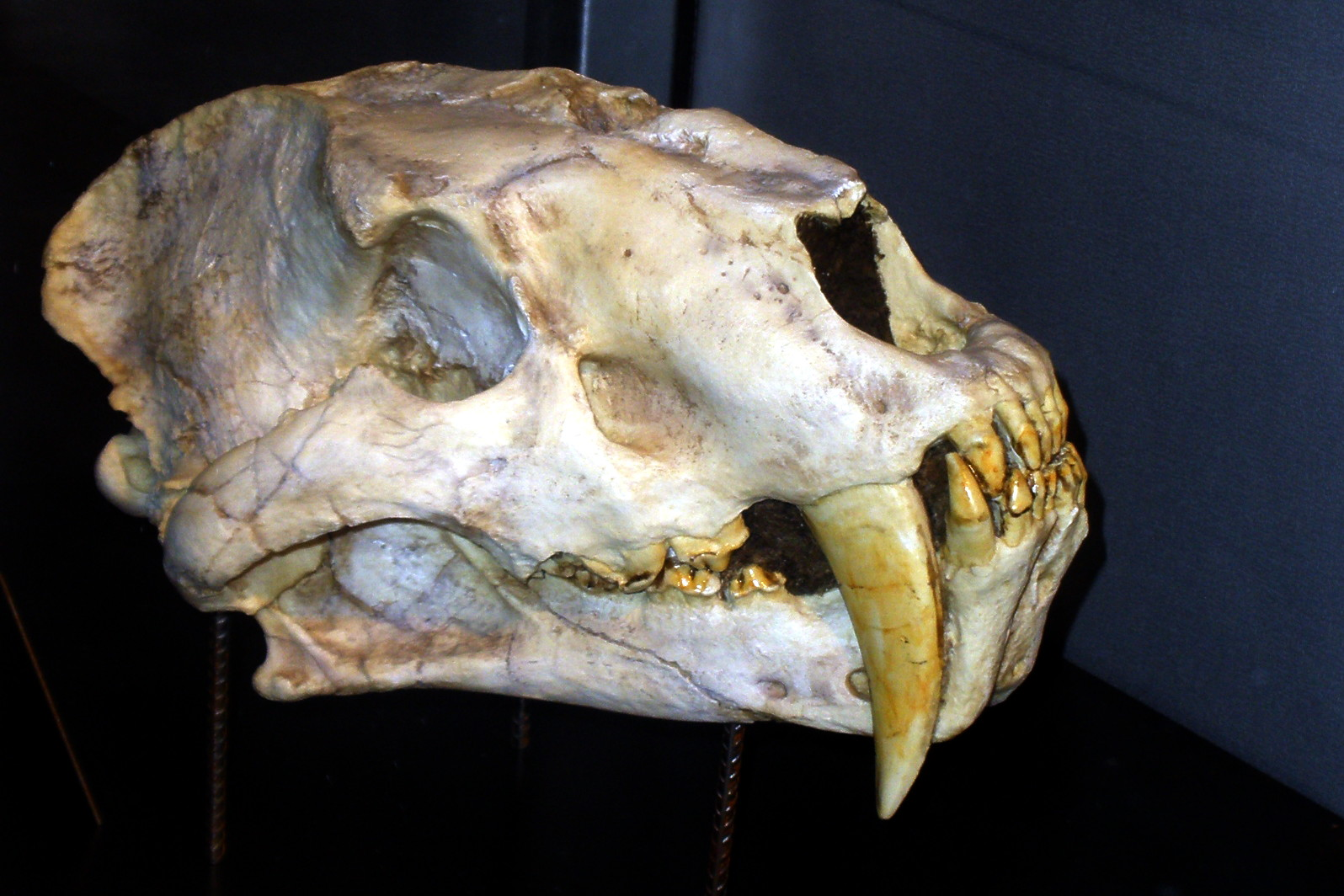
- Fossilized skull of the Miocene saber-toothed cat Amphimachairodus
  †Amphimachairodus
  - †Amphimachairodus coloradensis
- †Amplibuteo
  - †Amplibuteo concordatus
- †Antecalomys
  - †Antecalomys vasquezi
- Antrozous
  - †Antrozous pallidus
- Aquila
  - †Aquila bivia
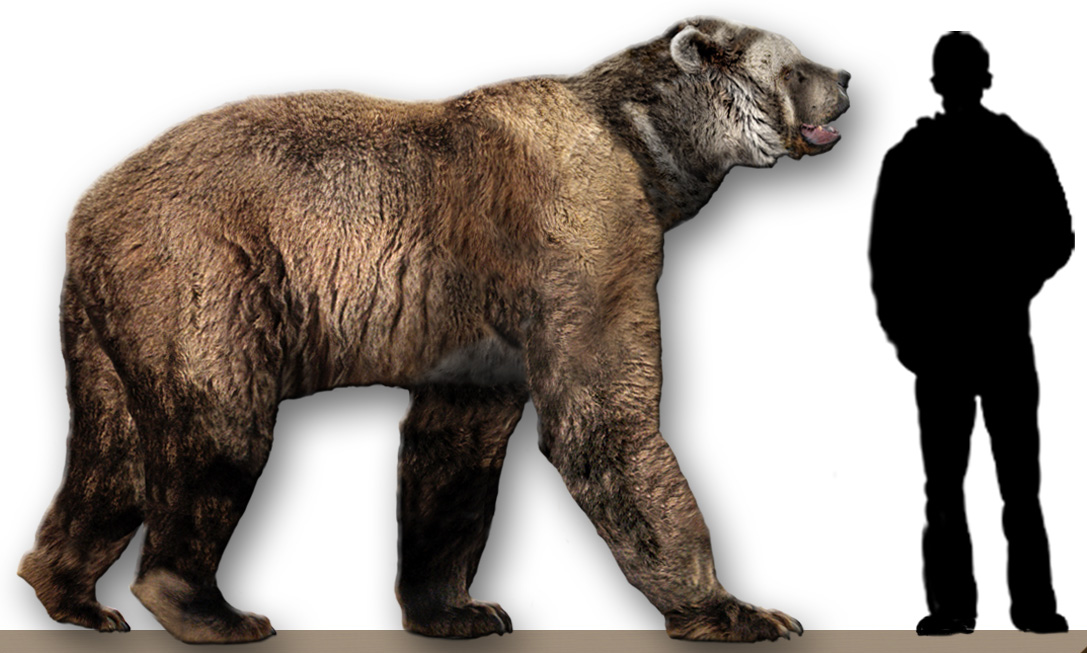
- Restoration of an Arctodus, or short-faced bear, with a human to scale
  †Arctodus
- †Aztlanolagus
  - †Aztlanolagus agilis

== B ==
- Baiomys
- Bassariscus
- †Bensonomys
  - †Bensonomys arizonae
  - †Bensonomys elachys – or unidentified comparable form
  - †Bensonomys gidleyi
  - †Bensonomys yazhi
- Bison
- †Boreohippidion
  - †Boreohippidion galushai
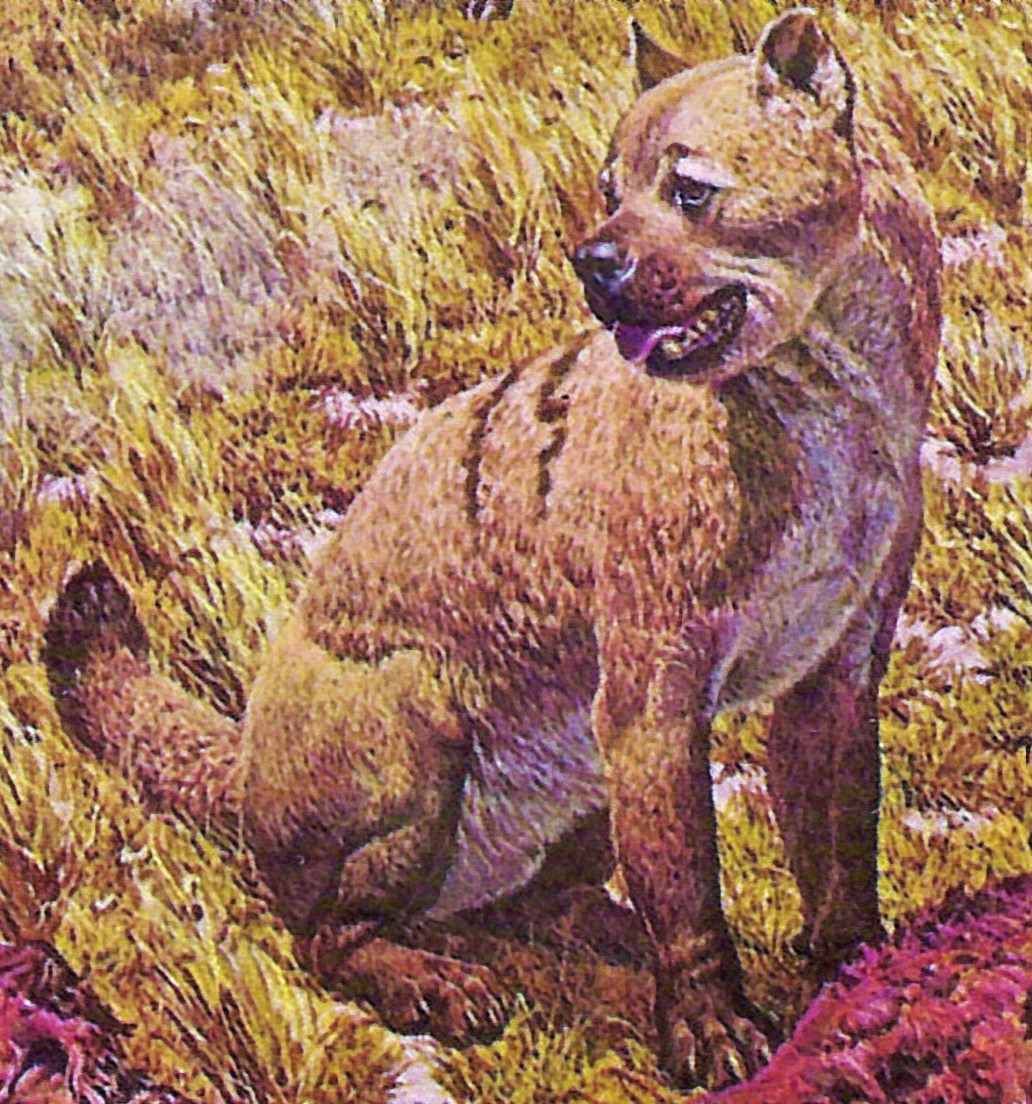
- Restoration of two of the Miocene-Pliocene bone-crushing dog genus Borophagus preying on a camel. Jay Matternes (1964).
  †Borophagus
  - †Borophagus diversidens
  - †Borophagus parvus – type locality for species
- Brachylagus
- Bufo
  - †Bufo pliocompactilis
  - †Bufo woodhousei

== C ==
- †Calcibacunculus – type locality for genus
  - †Calcibacunculus tenuis – type locality for species
- †Calciphilus – type locality for genus
  - †Calciphilus abboti – type locality for species
- †Calcitro – type locality for genus
  - †Calcitro fisheri – type locality for species
- †Calcoschizomus – type locality for genus
  - †Calcoschizomus latisternum – type locality for species
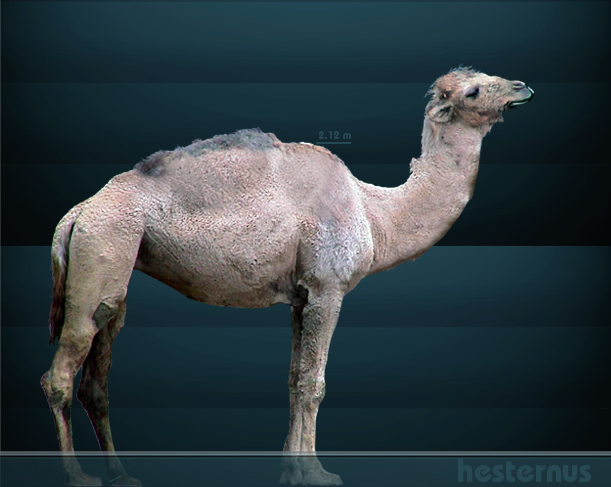
- Life restoration of the Pliocene-Holocene camel Camelops
  †Camelops
  - †Camelops hesternus – or unidentified comparable form
- Canis
  - †Canis armbrusteri
  - †Canis dirus
  - †Canis edwardii
  - †Canis ferox
  - †Canis latrans
  - †Canis thooides – type locality for species
- †Capromeryx
  - †Capromeryx arizonensis
  - †Capromeryx gidleyi
- †Carpocyon
  - †Carpocyon robustus
- Castor
- Celtis
  - †Celtis reticulata
- †Cernictis
  - †Cernictis repenningi – type locality for species
- Cervus
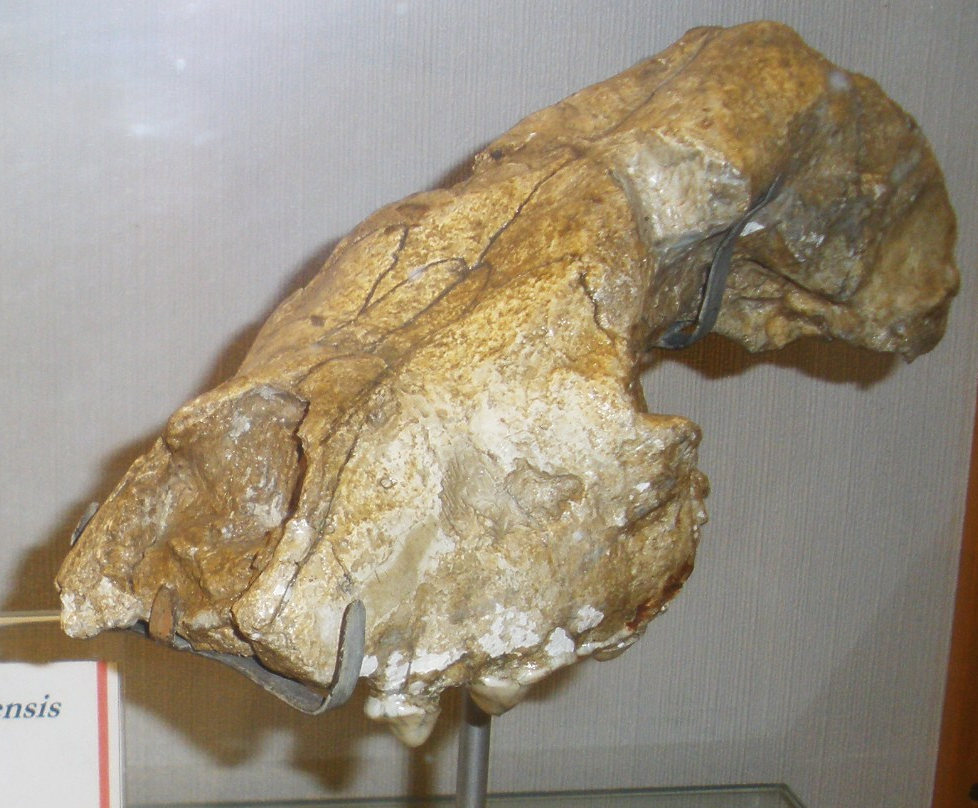
- Fossilized cranium of the Pliocene-Pleistocene hyena Chasmaporthetes
  †Chasmaporthetes
  - †Chasmaporthetes ossifragus – type locality for species
- †Chrysocyon
  - †Chrysocyon nearcticus – type locality for species
- †Citellus
  - †Citellus bensoni
  - †Citellus cochisei
- Cnemidophorus
- †Copemys
- Cratogeomys
  - †Cratogeomys bensoni
  - †Cratogeomys sansimonensis
- Crotaphytus – or unidentified comparable form
- †Cupidinimus
  - †Cupidinimus bidahochiensis
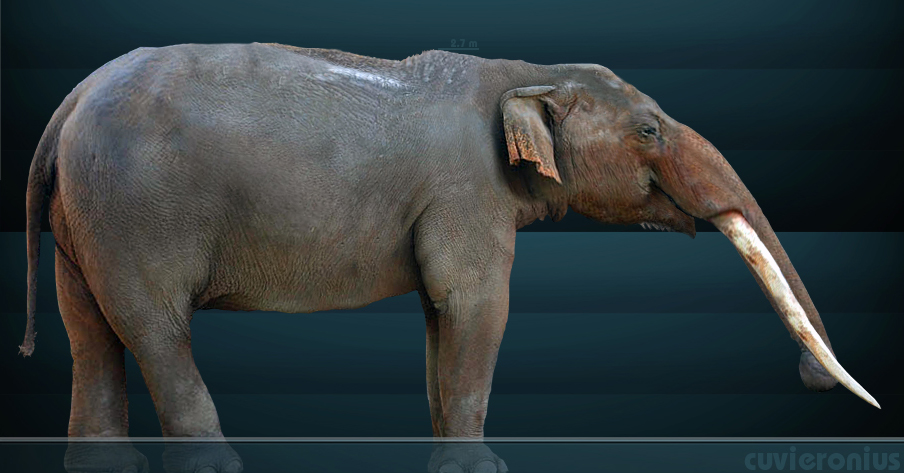
- Life restoration of the Pliocene-Holocene elephant relative Cuvieronius
  †Cuvieronius

== D ==
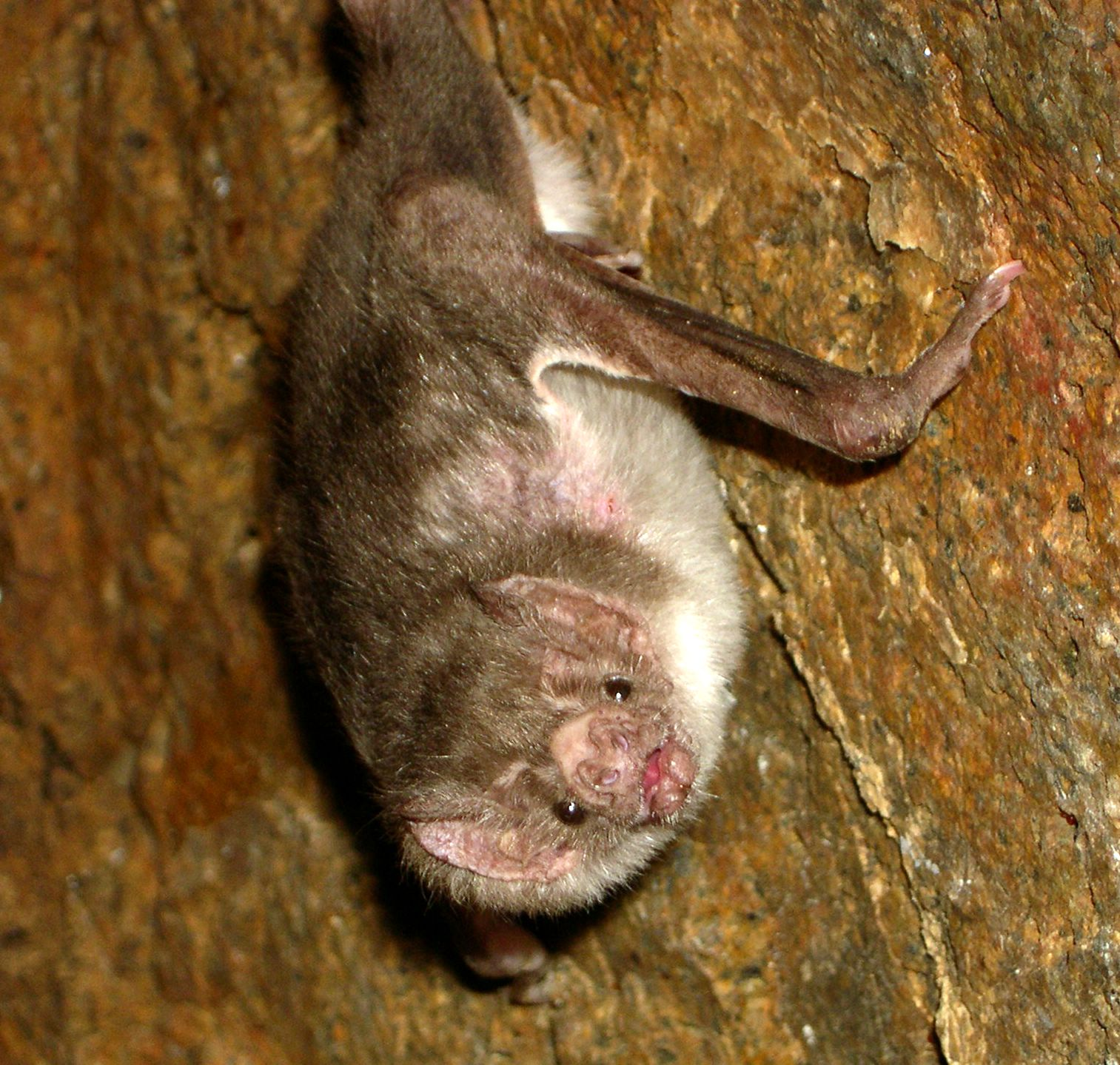
- A living Desmodus, or vampire bat
  Desmodus
  - †Desmodus stocki
- †Diceratherium
- †Dinohippus
  - †Dinohippus leidyanus
- Dipodomys
  - †Dipodomys gidleyi
  - †Dipodomys hibbardi
  - †Dipodomys minor
- †Dipoides
  - †Dipoides williamsi – type locality for species
- †Domninoides – tentative report

== E ==
- †Epicyon
  - †Epicyon haydeni
- Eptesicus – or unidentified comparable form
- Equus
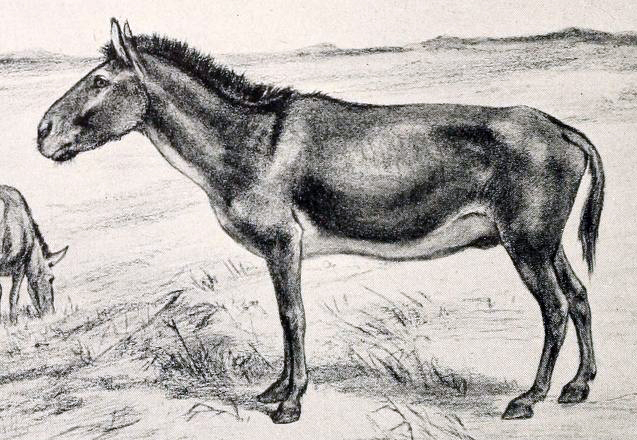
  - Restoration of the Pliocene-Holocene horse Equus scotti, or Scott's horse
    †Equus scotti – or unidentified comparable form
  - †Equus simplicidens
- Erethizon
  - †Erethizon bathygnathum
- †Eucyon
  - †Eucyon davisi
- Eumeces
- Eumops
  - †Eumops perotis – or unidentified comparable form

== G ==
- †Galushamys
  - †Galushamys redingtonensis
- †Geococcyx
  - †Geococcyx californianus
- Geomys
  - †Geomys minor
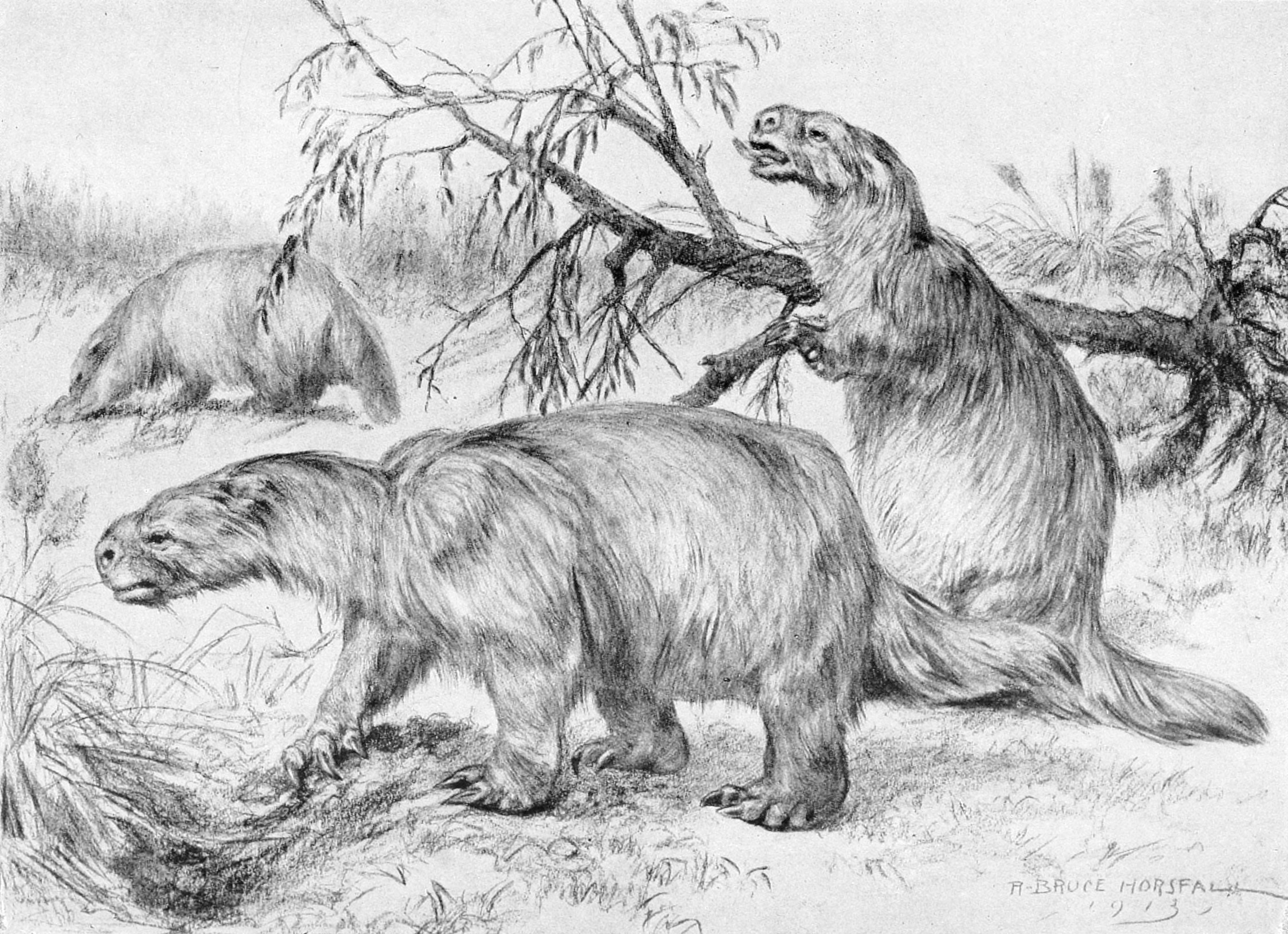
- Restoration of a herd of the Pliocene-Holocene ground sloth Glossotherium
  †Glossotherium
  - †Glossotherium chapadmalense
- †Glyptotherium
  - †Glyptotherium arizonae
  - †Glyptotherium texanum

== H ==
- †Hemiauchenia
- †Hesperotestudo
- Heterodon
  - †Heterodon nasicus – or unidentified comparable form
- †Histiotus
  - †Histiotus stocki
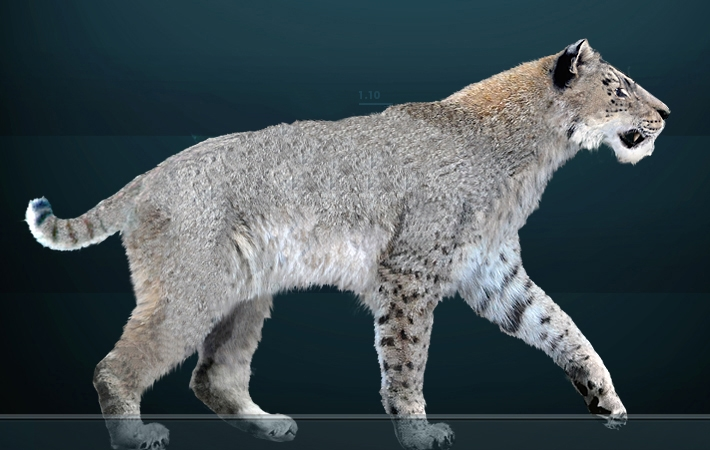
- Restoration of Pliocene-Pleistocene Homotherium, or scimitar cat
  †Homotherium – tentative report
- Hyla
- †Hypolagus
  - †Hypolagus arizonensis – type locality for species
  - †Hypolagus edensis
  - †Hypolagus ringoldensis
  - †Hypolagus tedfordi
  - †Hypolagus vetus

== I ==
- Ictalurus – tentative report
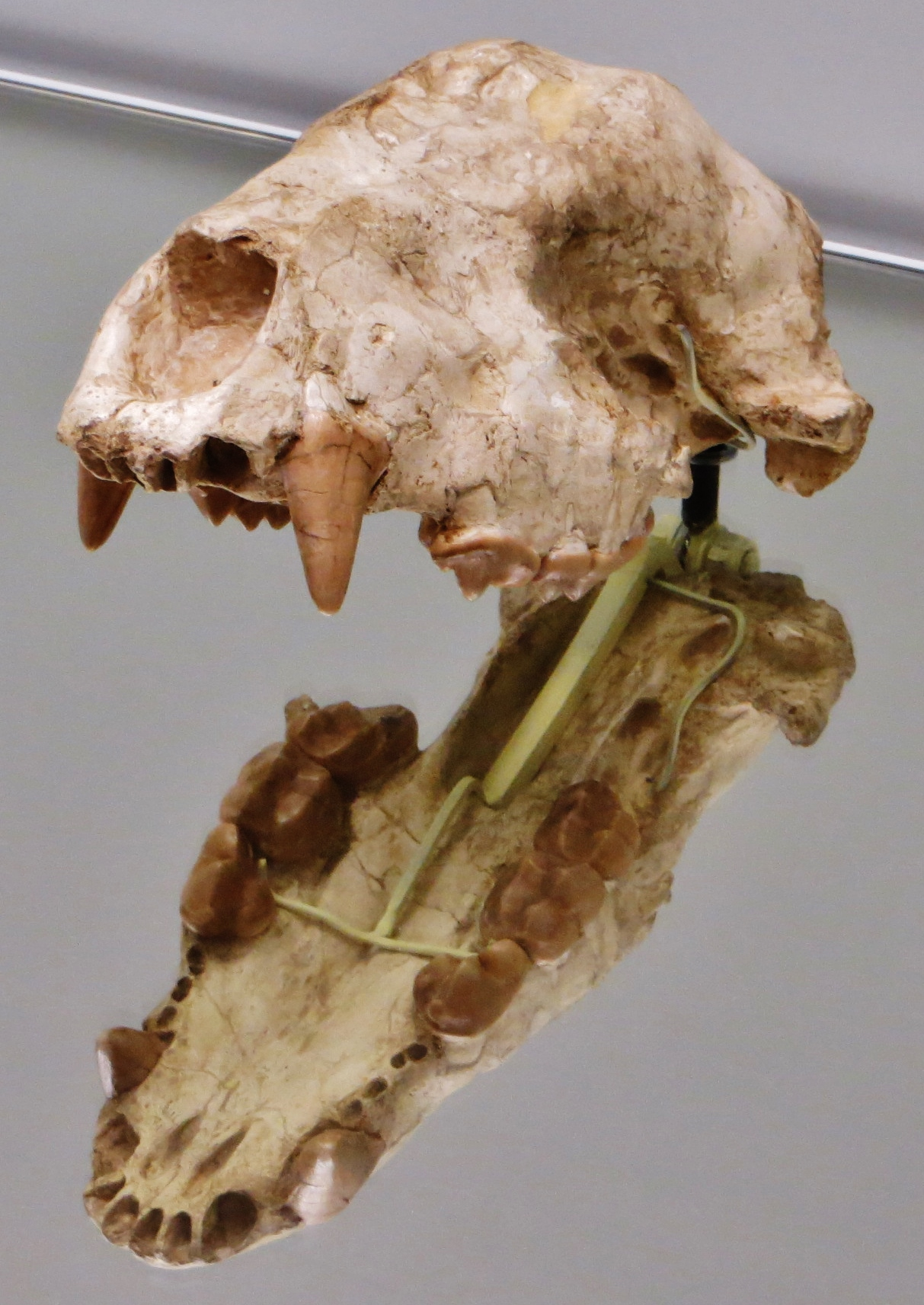
- Fossilized skull of the Miocene bear Indarctos
  †Indarctos – tentative report

== J ==
- †Jacobsomys
  - †Jacobsomys verdensis

== K ==
- †Kansasimys
  - †Kansasimys wilsoni
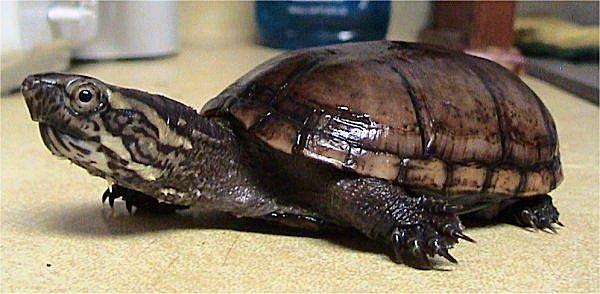
- A living Kinosternon, or mud turtle
  Kinosternon
  - †Kinosternon arizonense – type locality for species

== L ==
- Lampropeltis
  - †Lampropeltis getulus
- Lasiurus
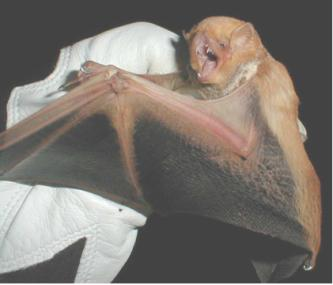
  - A living Lasiurus blossevillii, or desert red bat
    †Lasiurus blossevillii – or unidentified comparable form
- Lemmiscus
  - †Lemmiscus curtatus
- Lepus
  - †Lepus benjamini – type locality for species
- Lynx

== M ==
- †Machairodus
- †Mammut
- †Mammuthus
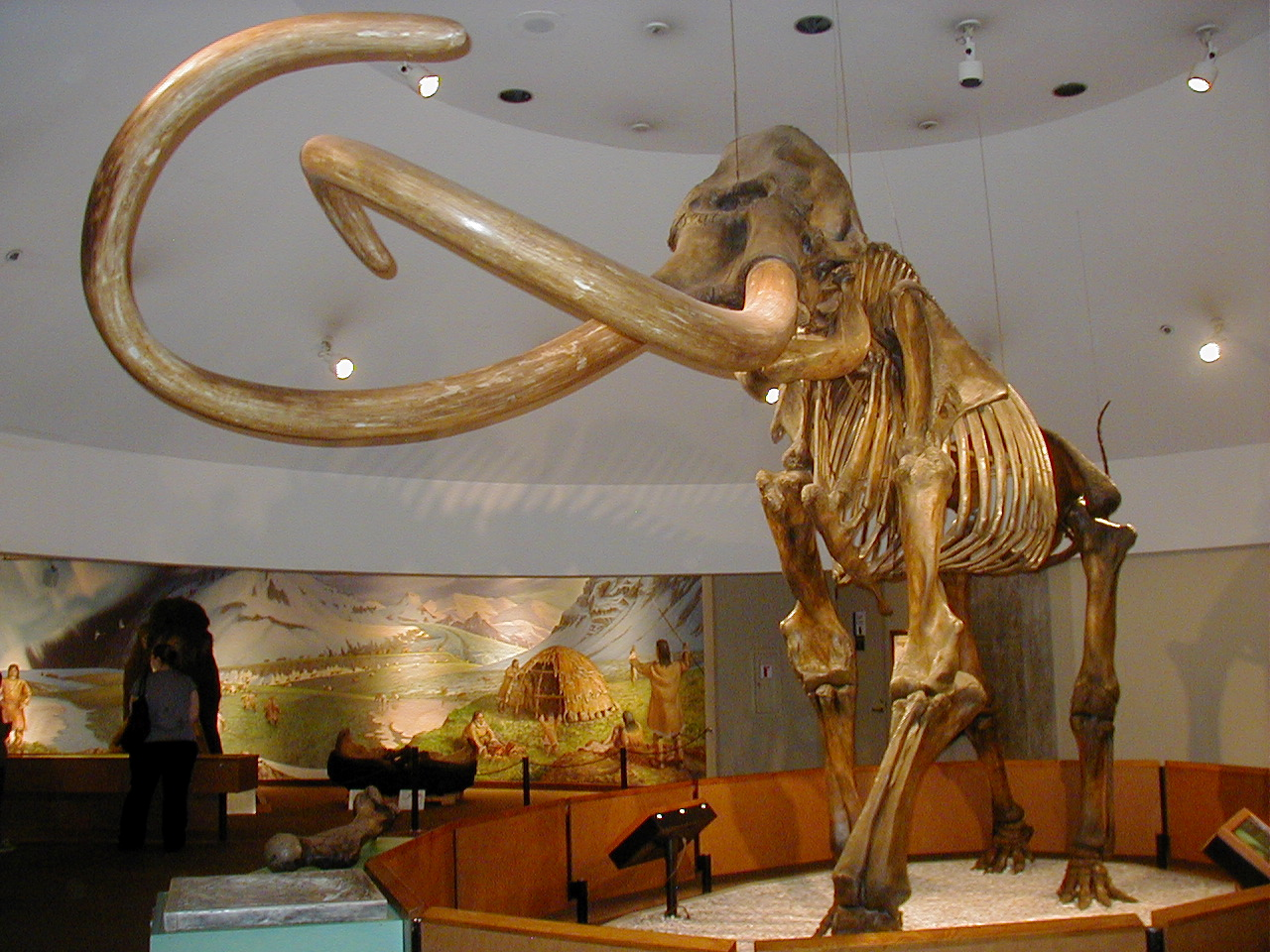
  - Mounted fossilized skeleton of a Mammuthus columbi or Columbian mammoth
    †Mammuthus columbi
- Marmota
  - †Marmota arizonae – type locality for species
- Martes
- †Megalonyx
  - †Megalonyx jeffersonii
- †Megatylopus
  - †Megatylopus matthewi
- Meleagris
  - †Meleagris crassipes – or unidentified comparable form
  - †Meleagris progenes – or unidentified comparable form
- †Merychyus
  - †Merychyus calaminthus
- †Metalopex
  - †Metalopex macconnelli
- Microtus
- Mictomys
  - †Mictomys vetus
- †Morrillia
  - †Morrillia barbouri
- Mustela
  - †Mustela frenata – or unidentified comparable form
- Myotis
  - †Myotis thysanodes
  - †Myotis velifer

== N ==
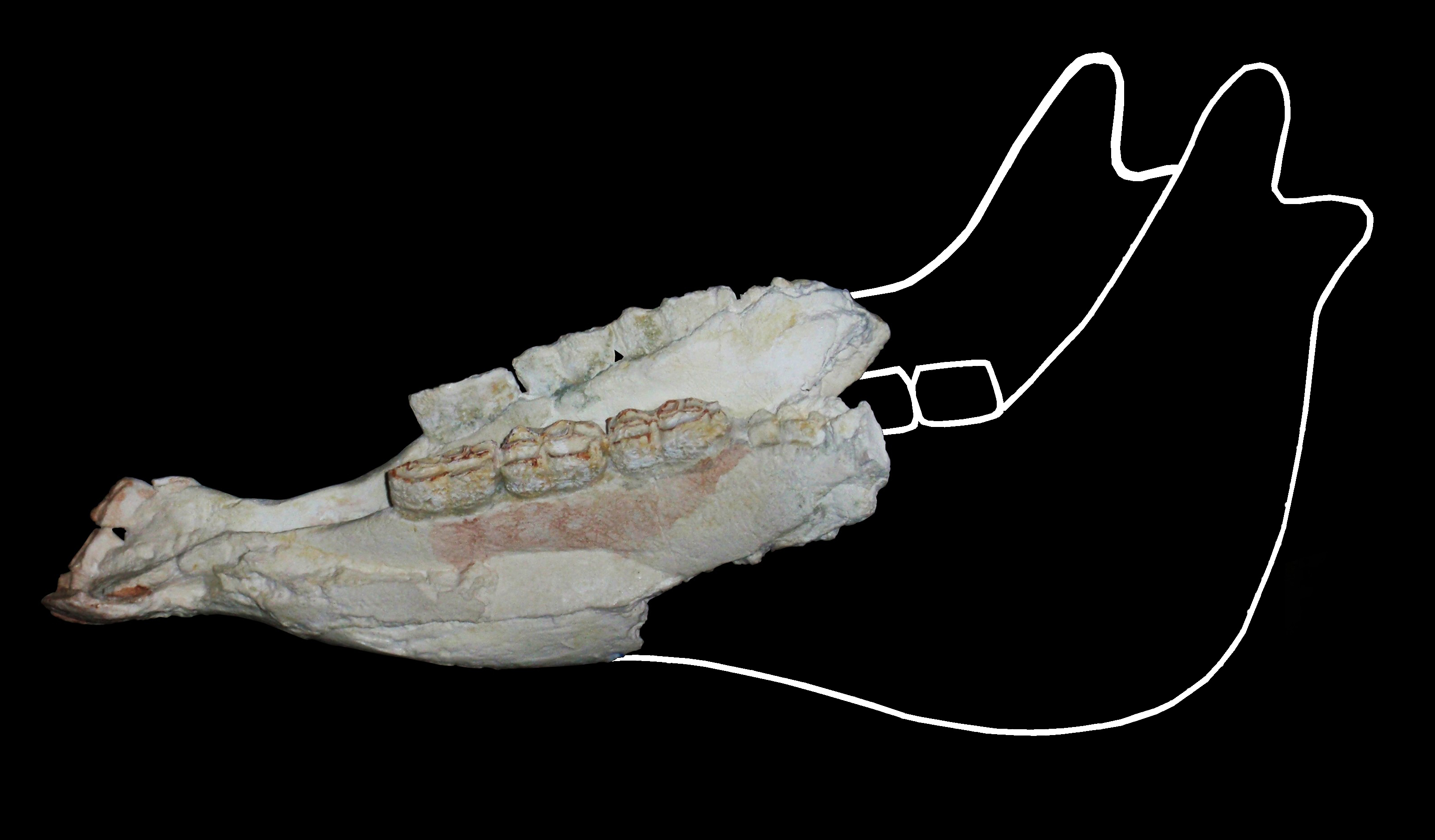
- Partial fossilized mandible of the Miocene-Pliocene horse Nannippus
  †Nannippus
  - †Nannippus peninsulatus
- †Nekrolagus
  - †Nekrolagus progressus
- †Neochoerus
- Neotoma
  - †Neotoma albigula – or unidentified comparable form
  - †Neotoma cinerea
  - †Neotoma fossilis
  - †Neotoma mexicana – or unidentified comparable form
  - †Neotoma quadriplicata
  - †Neotoma taylori
  - †Neotoma vaughani – type locality for species
- Nerodia
- †Nerterogeomys
  - †Nerterogeomys persimilis
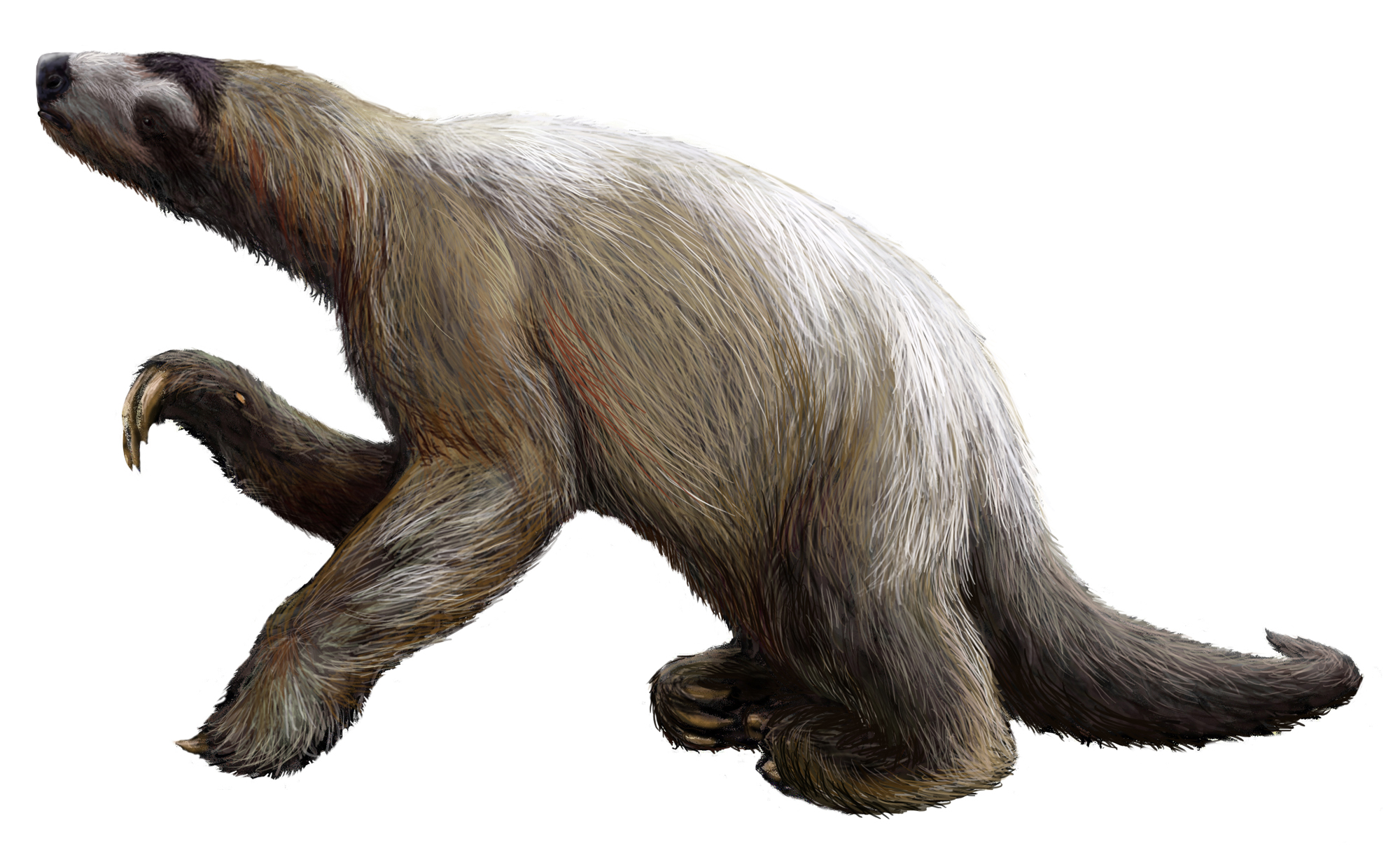
- Life restoration of the Pleistocene ground sloth Nothrotheriops
  †Nothrotheriops
- †Nothrotherium
  - †Nothrotherium shastense
- Notiosorex
  - †Notiosorex crawfordi
- †Notolagus
  - †Notolagus lepusculus

== O ==
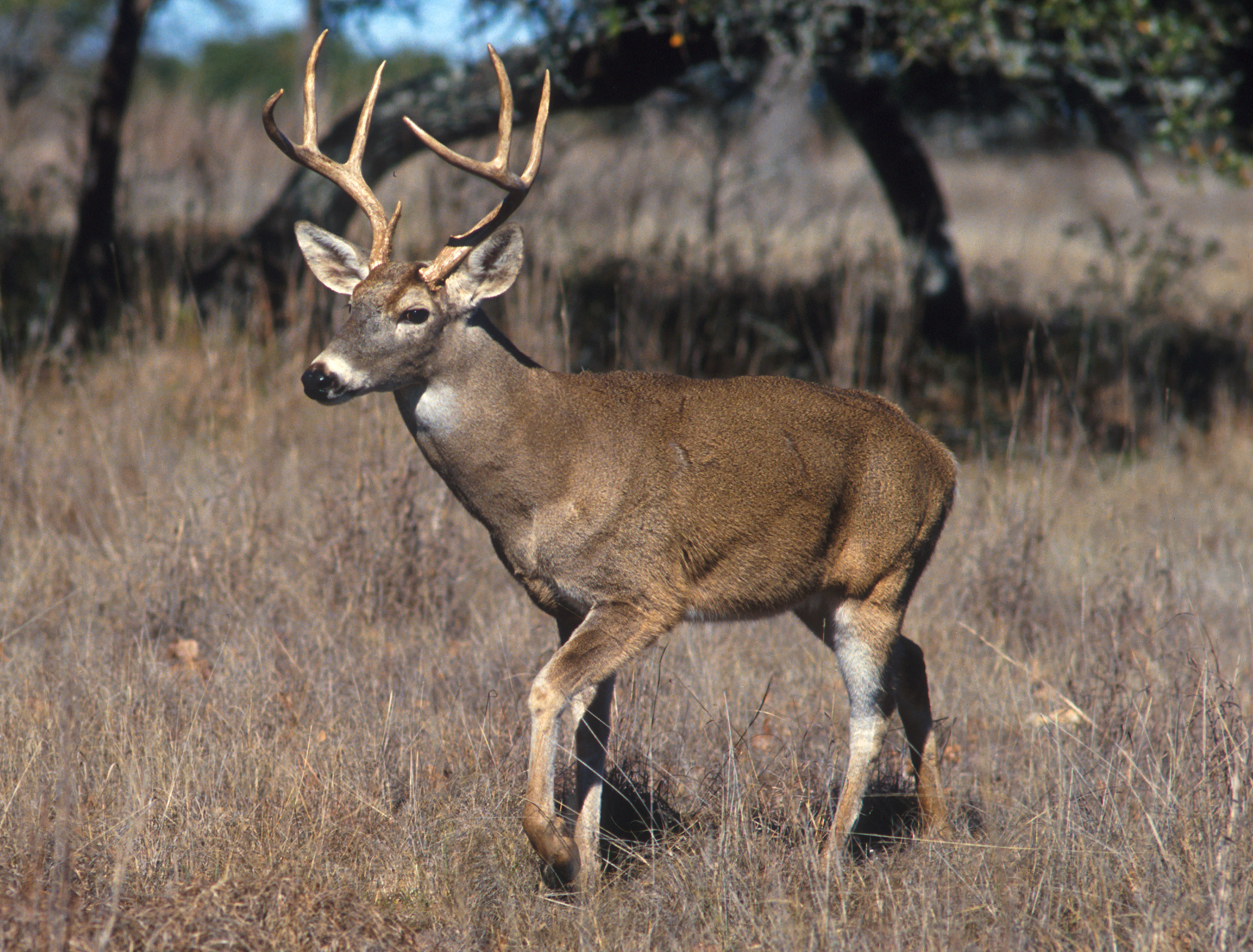
- A living Odocoileus deer
  Odocoileus
- Ogmodontomys
- Ondatra
  - †Ondatra idahoensis
  - †Ondatra meadensis
  - †Ondatra zibethicus
- †Onychocampodea – type locality for genus
  - †Onychocampodea onychis – type locality for species
- †Onychojapyx – type locality for genus
  - †Onychojapyx schmidti – type locality for species
- †Onycholepisma – type locality for genus
  - †Onycholepisma arizonae – type locality for species
- †Onychomachilis – type locality for genus
  - †Onychomachilis fisheri – type locality for species
- Onychomys
  - †Onychomys bensoni
  - †Onychomys pedroensis
- †Onychothelyphonus – type locality for genus
  - †Onychothelyphonus bonneri – type locality for species
- †Ophiomys
  - †Ophiomys taylori – or unidentified comparable form
- Ovis
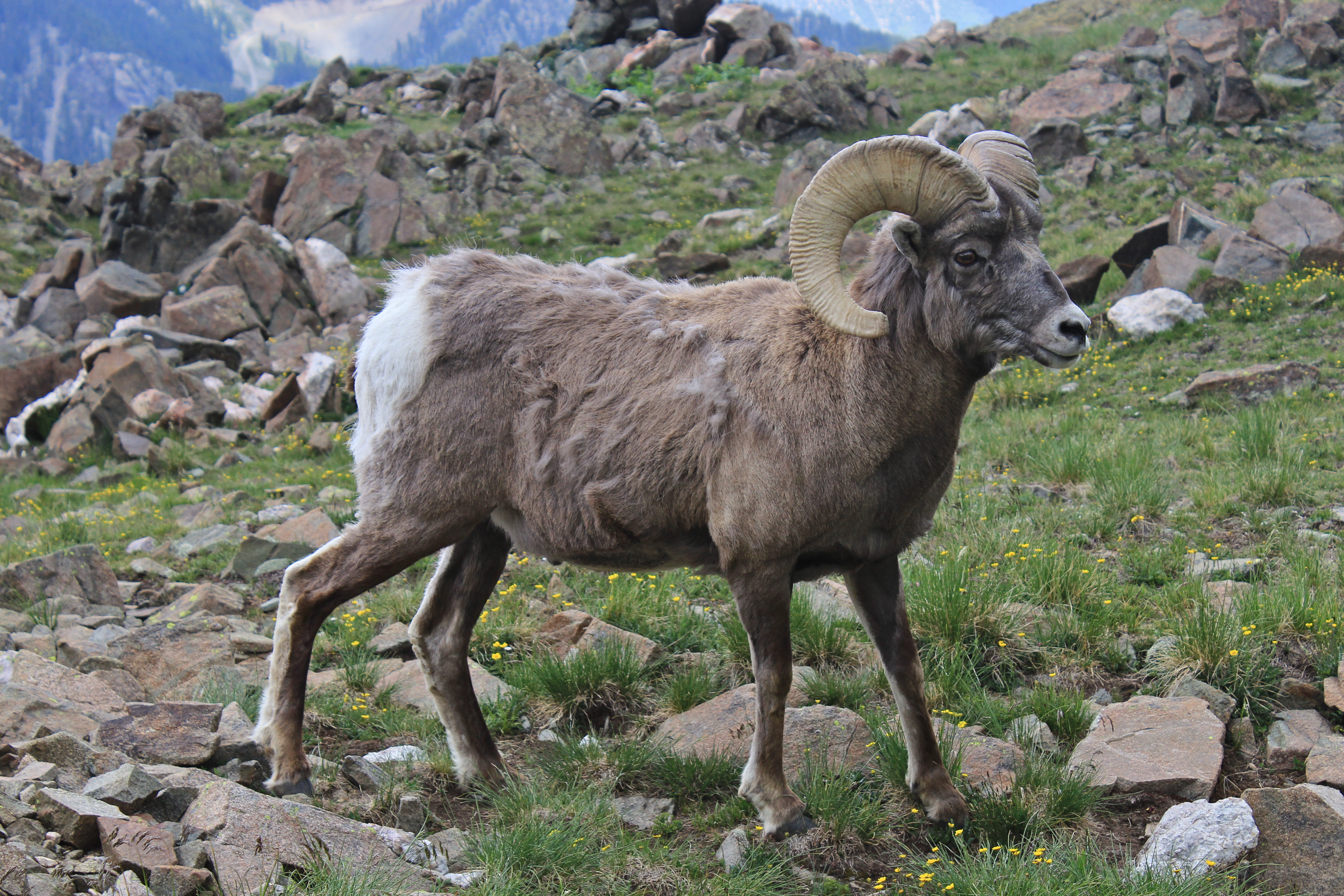
  - A living Ovis canadensis, or bighorn sheep
    †Ovis canadensis – type locality for species

== P ==
- †Paenemarmota
- †Paleokoenenia – type locality for genus
  - †Paleokoenenia mordax – type locality for species
- Panthera
  - †Panthera leo
- †Parajulus
  - †Parajulus onychis – type locality for species
- †Paramachaerodus
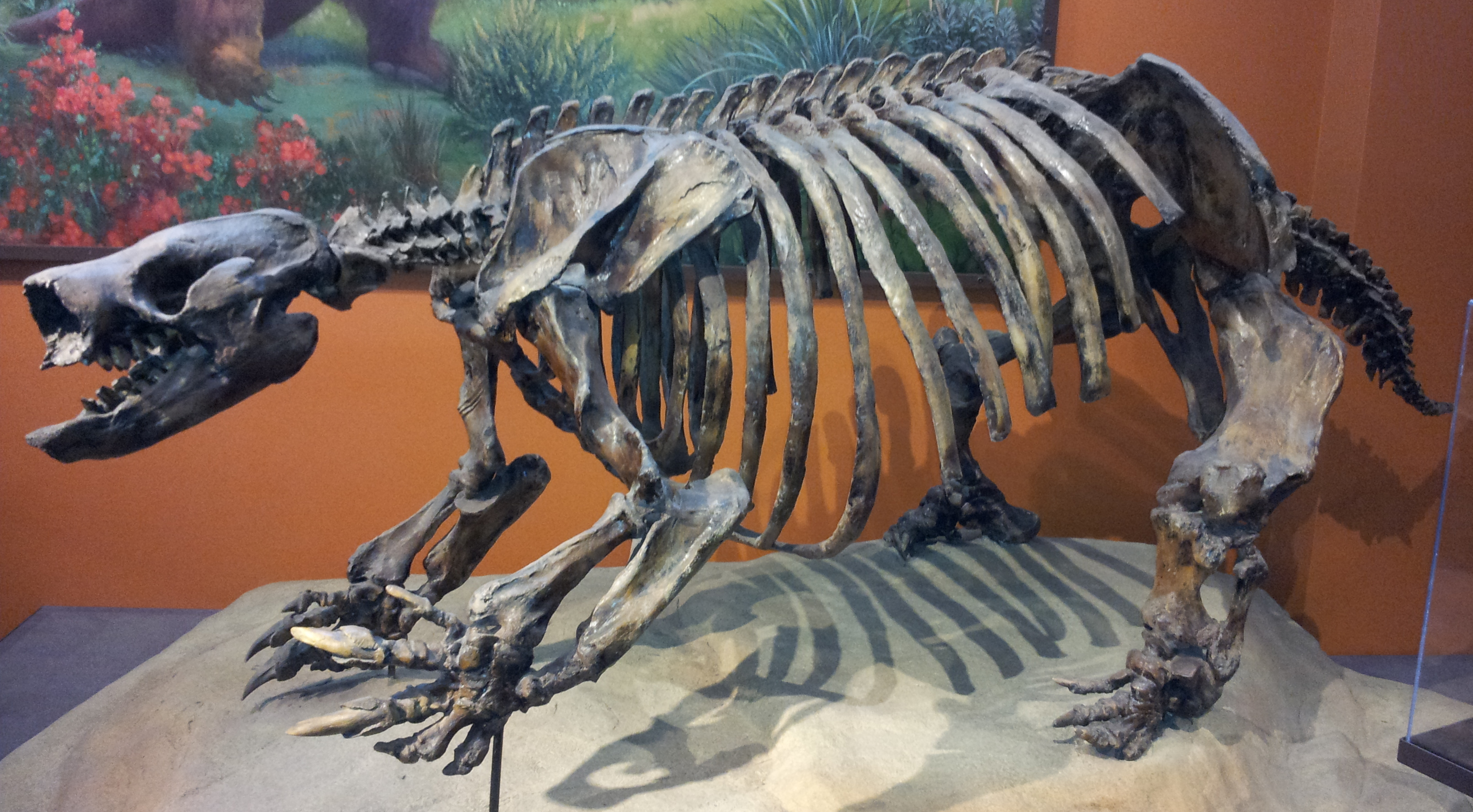
- Fossilized skeleton of the Pliocene-Pleistocene ground sloth Paramylodon
  †Paramylodon
  - †Paramylodon harlani
- †Paronychomys
  - †Paronychomys alticuspis – type locality for species
  - †Paronychomys lemredfieldi
  - †Paronychomys tuttlei
- Perognathus
  - †Perognathus gidleyi
  - †Perognathus henryredfieldi
  - †Perognathus mclaughlini
  - †Perognathus pearlettensis
  - †Perognathus strigipredus – type locality for species
- Peromyscus
  - †Peromyscus brachygnathus
  - †Peromyscus hagermanensis
  - †Peromyscus minimus
- †Phugatherium
  - †Phugatherium dichroplax
- Pituophis
  - †Pituophis melanoleucus
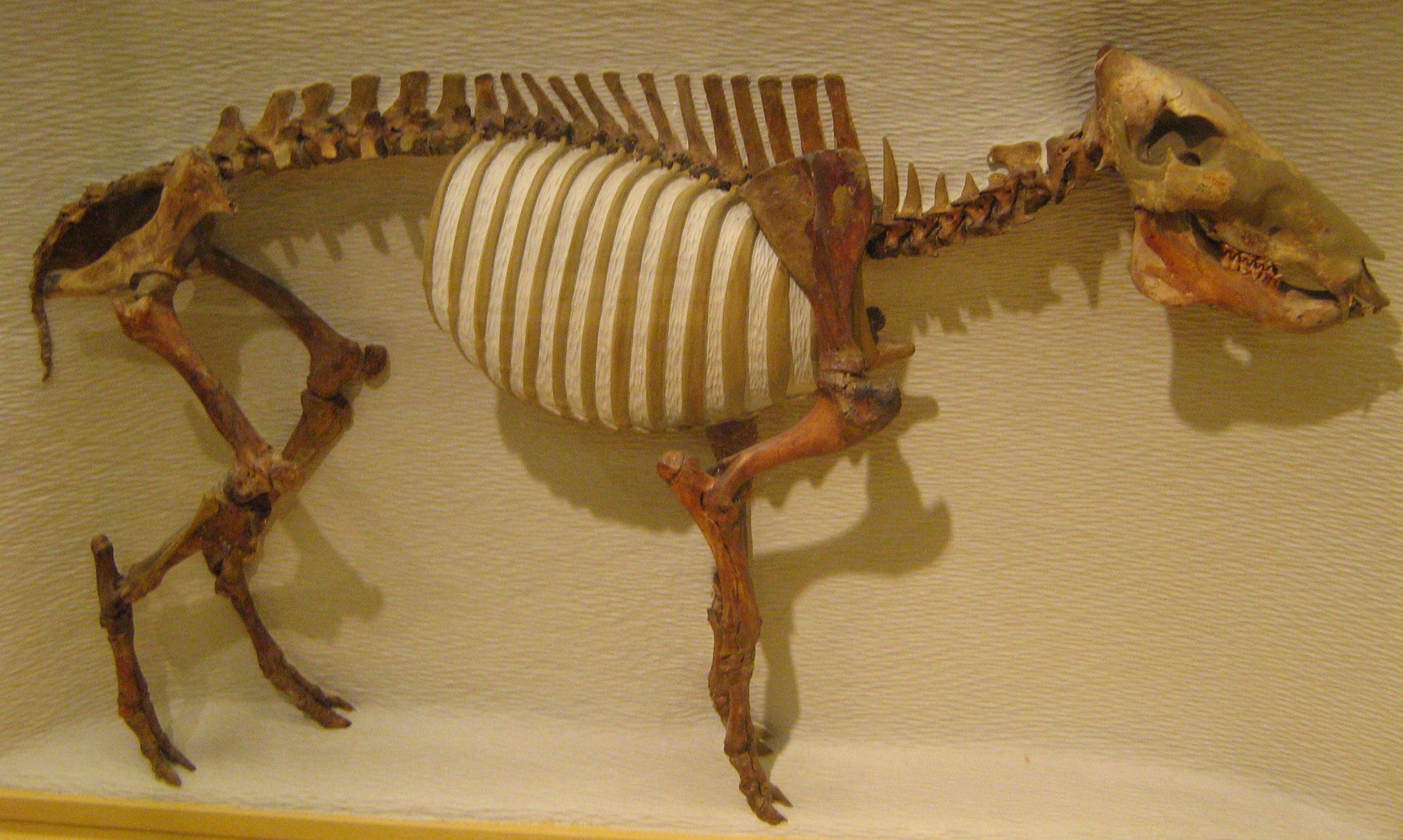
- Mounted fossilized skeleton of the Miocene-Pleistocene peccary Platygonus
  †Platygonus
  - †Platygonus compressus
- †Pleiolama
  - †Pleiolama vera
- †Plesiogulo
  - †Plesiogulo lindsayi
  - †Plesiogulo marshalli
- †Pliogale
  - †Pliogale furlongi
- †Plionarctos
- †Pliophenacomys
  - †Pliophenacomys primaevus
- †Plioprojapyx – type locality for genus
  - †Plioprojapyx primitivus – type locality for species
- †Pliotaxidea
  - †Pliotaxidea nevadensis – or unidentified comparable form
- †Prodipodomys
  - †Prodipodomys idahoensis
  - †Prodipodomys kansensis
- †Prosigmodon
  - †Prosigmodon holocuspis
- †Protolabis
  - †Protolabis coartatus
  - †Protolabis yavapaiensis – type locality for species
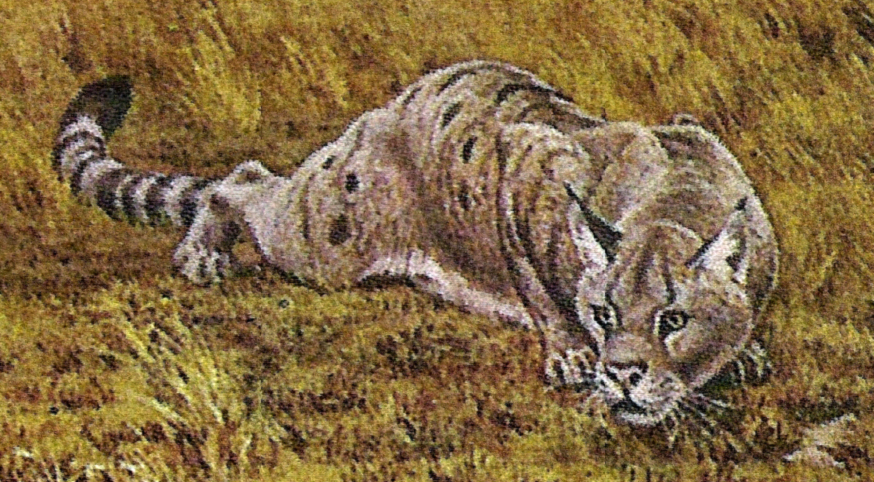
- Restoration of the Miocene cat Pseudaelurus
  †Pseudaelurus – report made of unidentified related form or using admittedly obsolete nomenclature
- Ptinus
  - †Ptinus priminidi

== R ==
- †Rana
- Reithrodontomys
  - †Reithrodontomys galushai
  - †Reithrodontomys rexroadensis
  - †Reithrodontomys wetmorei – or unidentified comparable form
- †Repomys
  - †Repomys arizonensis
  - †Repomys panacaensis – or unidentified comparable form
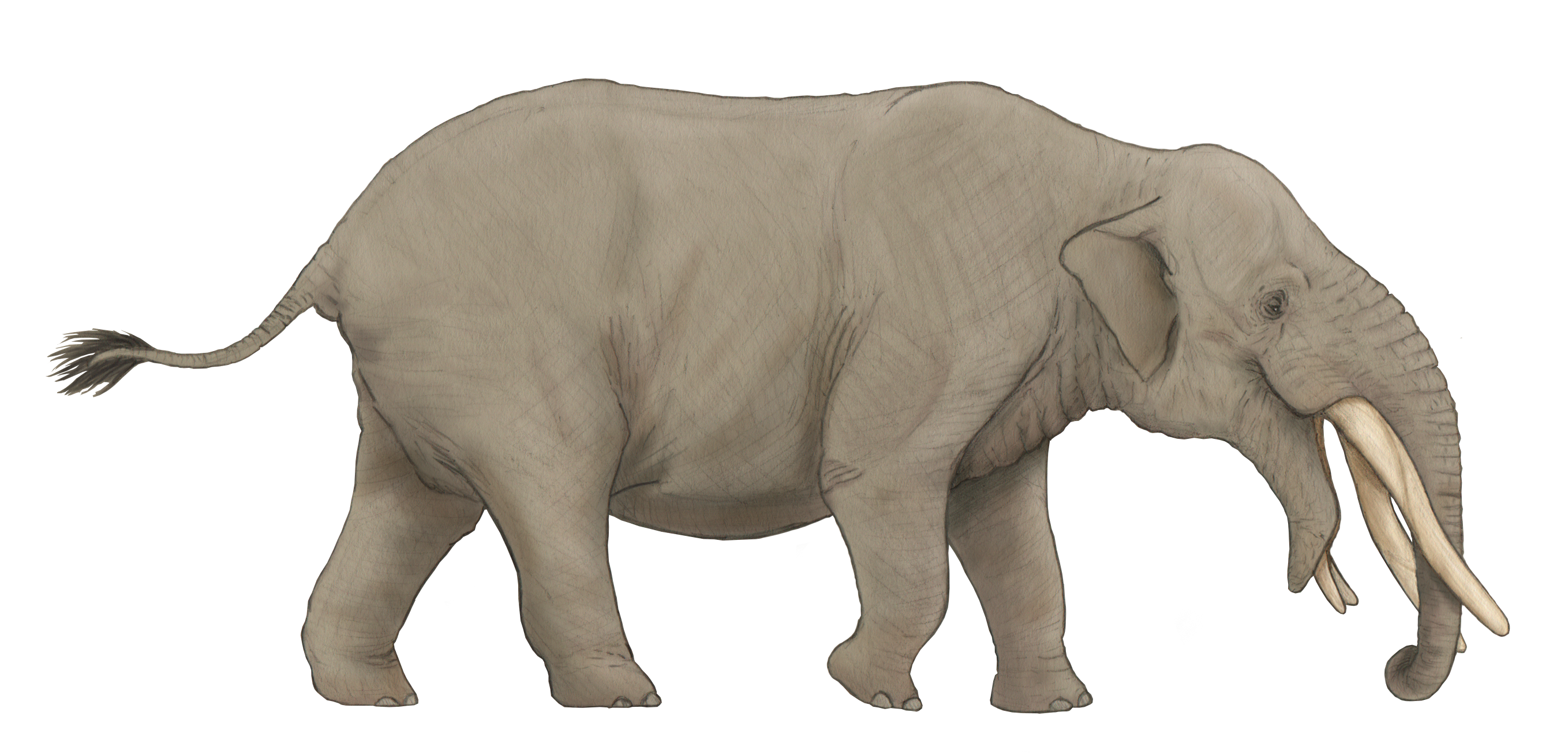
- Restoration of the Miocene-Pliocene elephant relative Rhynchotherium
  †Rhynchotherium
  - †Rhynchotherium falconeri – tentative report

== S ==
- Scaphiopus
- Sciurus
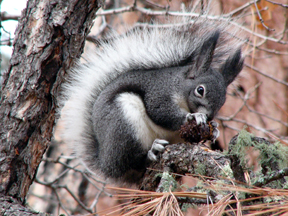
  - A living Sciurus aberti, or Abert's squirrel
    †Sciurus aberti – or unidentified comparable form
- Sigmodon
  - †Sigmodon curtisi
  - †Sigmodon minor
- Sorex
  - †Sorex taylori
- Spermophilus
  - †Spermophilus tuitus
  - †Spermophilus variegatus
- †Sphenophalos
  - †Sphenophalos nevadanus
- Spilogale
  - †Spilogale putorius
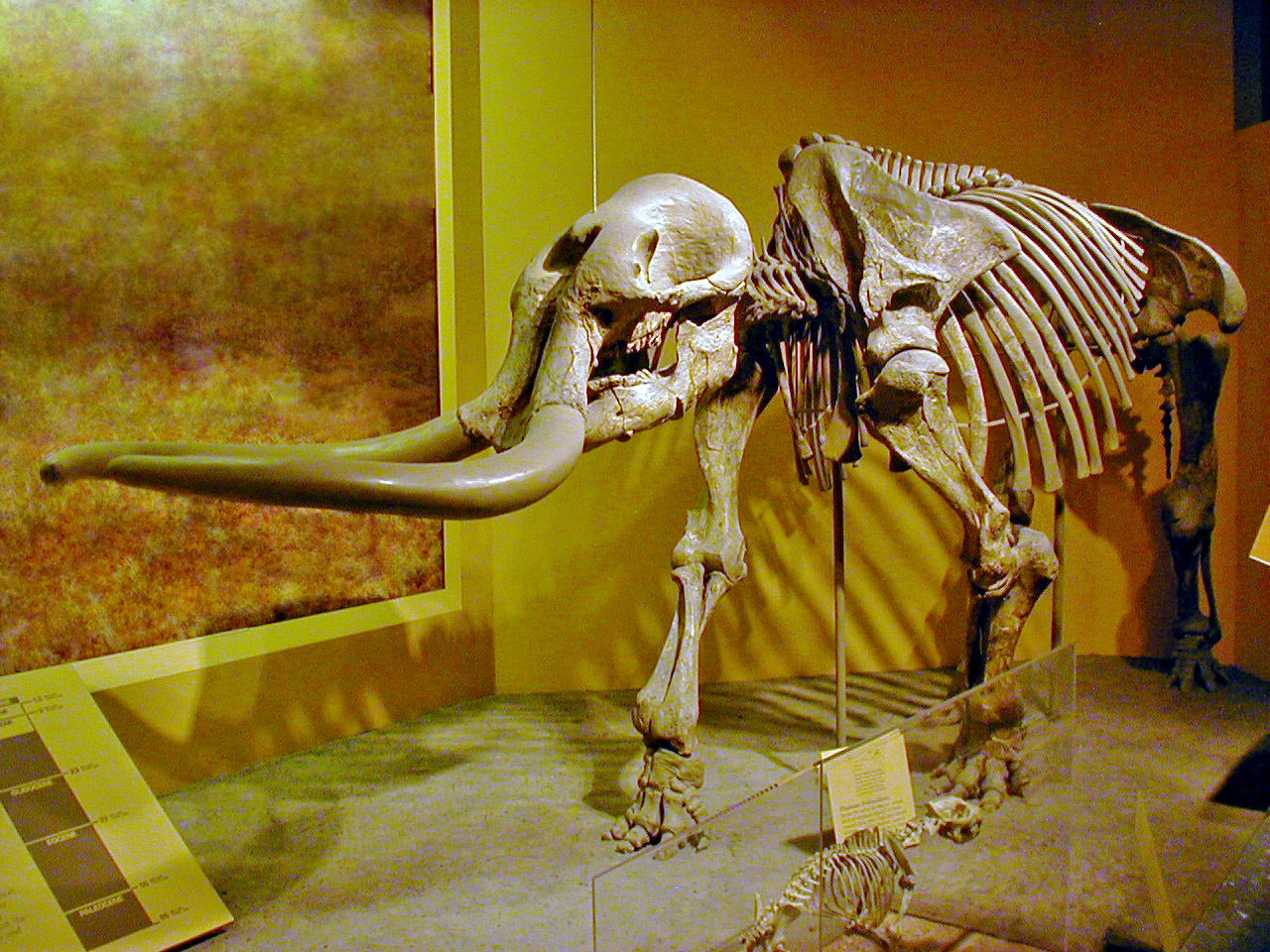
- Mounted fossilized skeleton of the Pliocene-Pleistocene elephant relative Stegomastodon
  †Stegomastodon
  - †Stegomastodon mirificus
- †Stenomylus
- †Stockoceros
  - †Stockoceros conklingi – or unidentified comparable form
  - †Stockoceros onusrosagris
- Sylvilagus
  - †Sylvilagus audubonii – or unidentified comparable form
  - †Sylvilagus cunicularis – or unidentified comparable form
  - †Sylvilagus hibbardi

== T ==
- Tapirus
  - †Tapirus merriami – or unidentified comparable form
- Taxidea
  - †Taxidea taxus
- Tayassu
  - †Tayassu tajacu
- †Teleoceras
  - †Teleoceras hicksi
- Terrapene
  - †Terrapene ornata – or unidentified comparable form
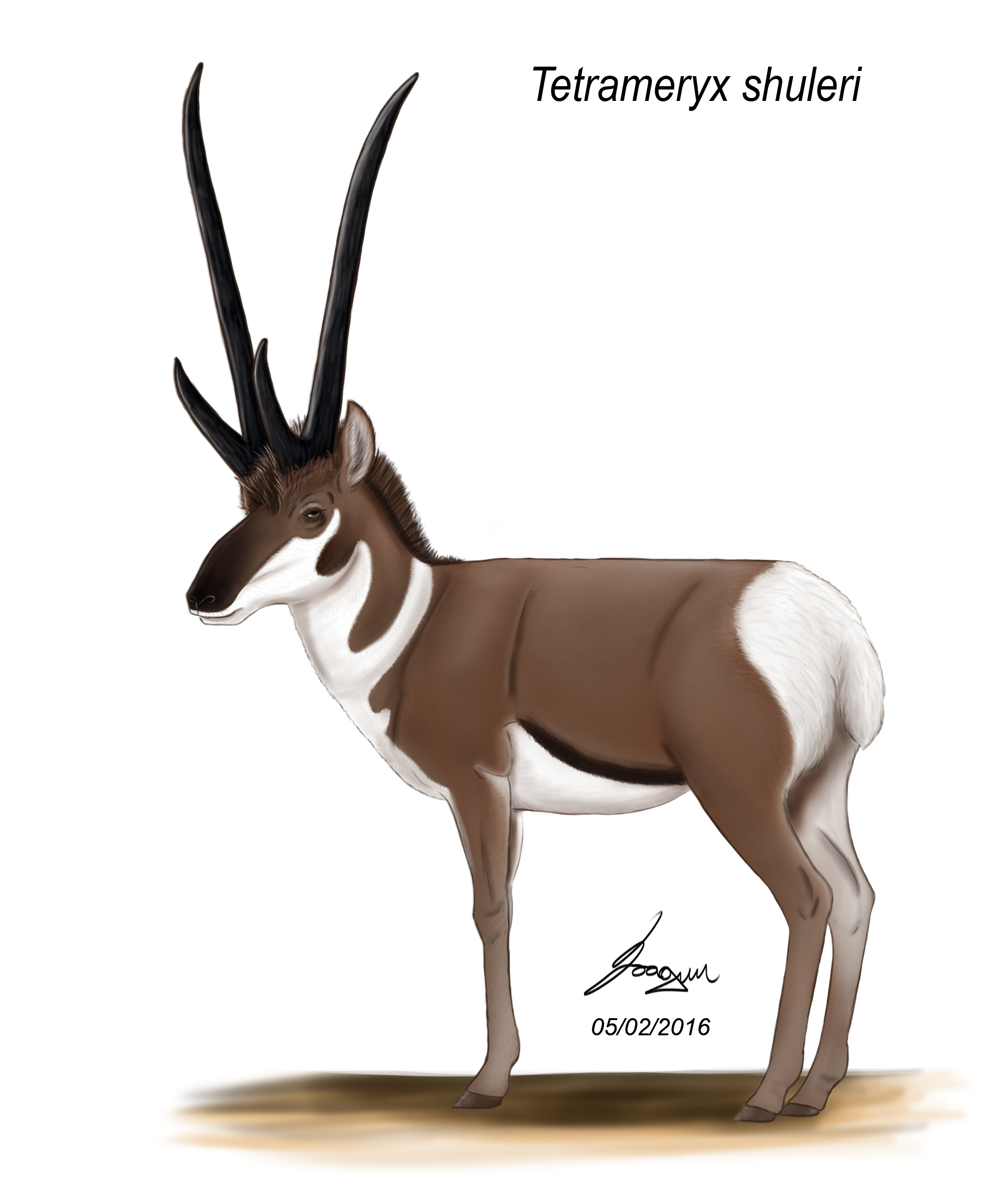
- Restoration of the Pleictocene pronghorn Tetrameryx
  †Tetrameryx – or unidentified comparable form
- †Texoceros
  - †Texoceros minorei
- Thamnophis
- Thomomys
- †Titanotylopus
  - †Titanotylopus nebraskensis
- †Trigonictis
  - †Trigonictis macrodon

== U ==
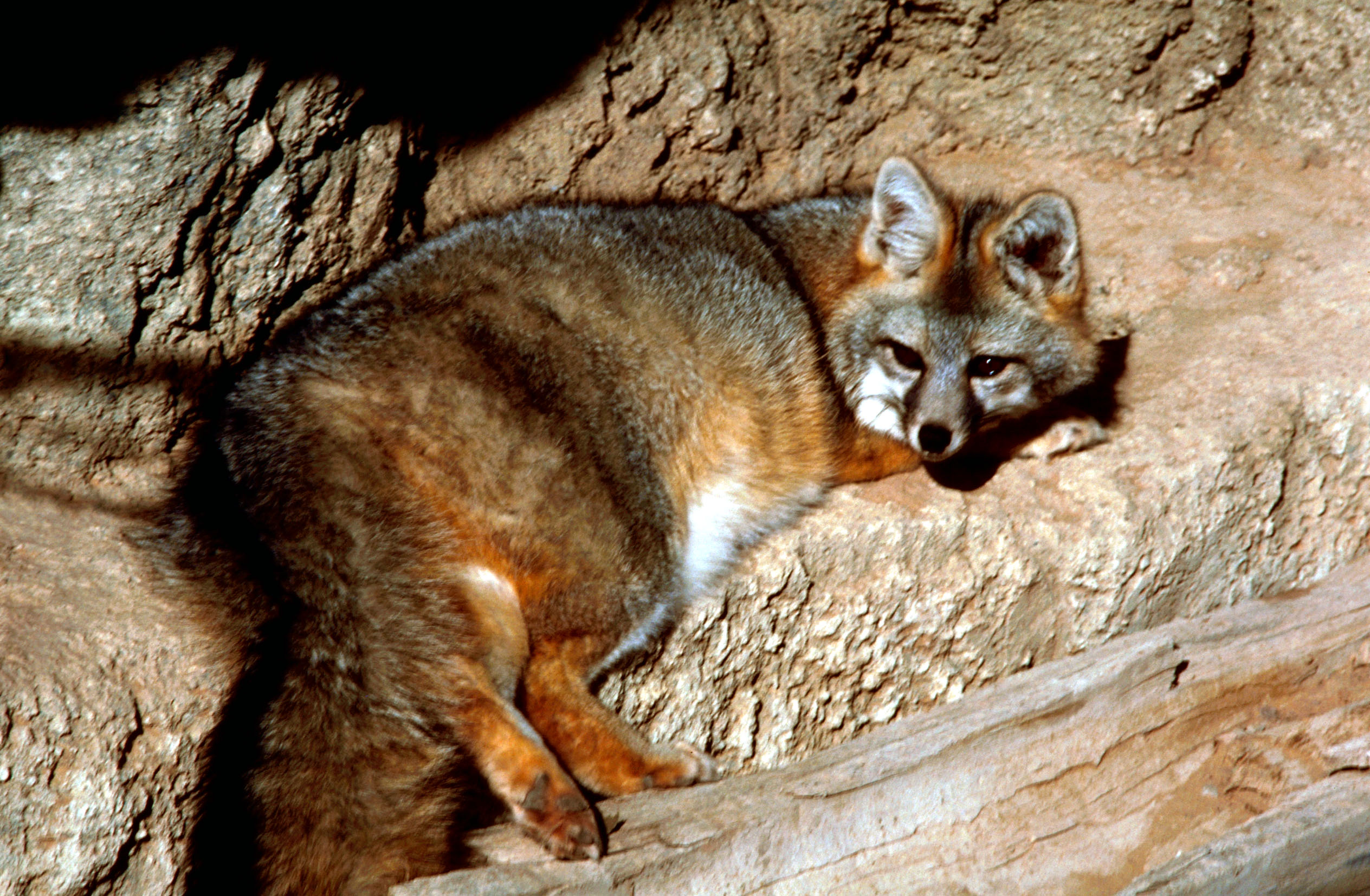
- A living Urocyon fox
  Urocyon
  - †Urocyon galushai – type locality for species

== V ==
- Vulpes
  - †Vulpes stenognathus
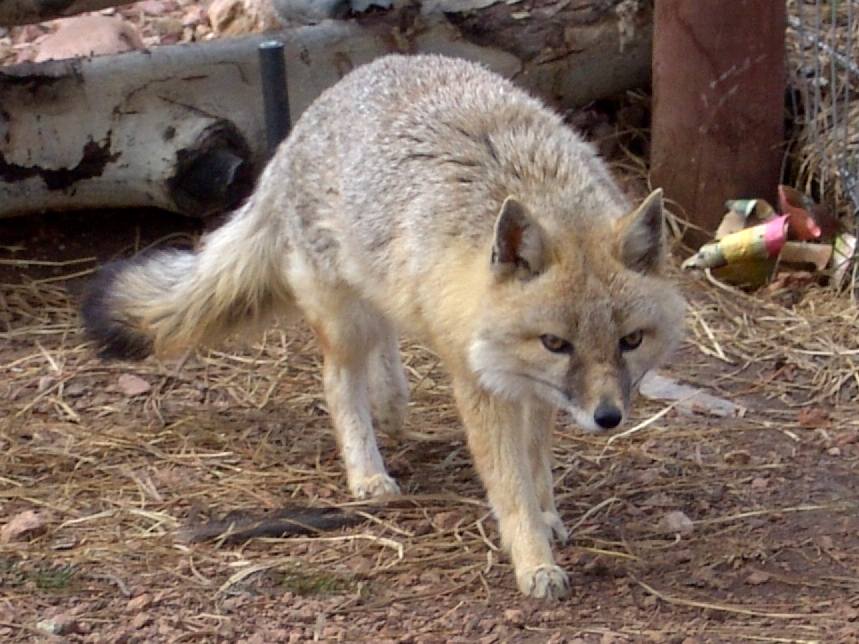
  - A living Vulpes velox, or swift fox
    †Vulpes velox
