= Huracan (mammal) =

Huracan Temporal range: Late Miocene (Tortonian) to Early Pleistocene (Gelasian), 8–1.8 Ma

Scientific classification
- Kingdom: Animalia
- Phylum: Chordata
- Class: Mammalia
- Order: Carnivora
- Family: Ursidae
- Tribe: †Agriotheriini
- Genus: †Huracan; Jiangzuo et al., 2023

Type species
- †Agriotherium schneideri Sellards, 1916

Species
- †H. borissiaki Lopatin, 2025; †H. coffeyi (Dalquest, 1986); †H?. punjabensis (Lydekker, 1884); †H. qiui Jiangzuo et al., 2023; †H?. roblesi (Morales & Aguirre, 1976); †H. schneideri (Sellards, 1916)

Extinct genus of bears

Huracan is an extinct genus of agriotheriin ailuropodine bear from the Late Miocene to Early Pleistocene. Fossils were found from North America and Eastern Asia. Unlike its modern relative the giant panda (Ailuropoda melanoleuca), which is a bamboo specialist, Huracan was a hypercarnivorous (or omnivorous) genus of bear that had adaptations for cursoriality.

== History ==
Specimens of Huracan were originally classified as species of the related genus Agriotherium. Hunt (1998) had noted differences in the structure of the carnassials between Agriotherium schneideri and Old World species of said genus, but lots of similarities between A. schneideri and genus Indarctos. This was further supported in the 2019 publication of A. hendeyi which led the authors of the study to do a comprehensive analysis of agriotheriin specimens to assess their taxonomy. In 2025, a new species of Huracan was discovered in Russia, H. borissiaki.

== Systematics ==
When Jiangzuo et al. (2023) computed the phylogenetic analysis, they found Indarctos to be paraphyletic to the clade containing the genera Huracan and Agriotherium.

=== Species ===
==== Huracan schneideri ====
The type species, H. schneideri was formally described by Sellards in 1916 from fossil material collected from the Upper Bony Valley, Hardee and Polk counties, Florida, a typical Latest Hemphillian. The main holotype was a mandible (USNM 8838) but additional material of this species has since been collected from this locality and other locations from the southern United States, and parts of Mexico. Differs from other species in the genus of shorter and smaller premolars and molars. A 2019 thesis estimated that this species weighed 510 kg (1,120 lb), however a 2024 study found this species to be significantly smaller weighing 378 kg (833 lb). ^{Including supplementary materials}

==== H. coffeyi ====
H. coffeyi was described by Dalquest, 1986 on a holotype (MWSU 12147) found from Coffee Ranch in Texas. The holotype specimen is a partial mandible preserving some molar teeth. All specimens of the species were originally classified as those of Agriotherium schneideri, though H. coffeyi differs from H. schneideri in having much larger and longer premolars and molars.

==== H. qiui ====
H. qiui is a new species described by Jiangzuo et al. (2023). The holotype (HMV 2005) is a nearly complete skull from the Wangjiashan fossil locality. This species differs from H. coffeyi and H. schneideri in not being as hypercarnivorous with more developed anterior premolars and the first and second molars longer. The skull is also much narrower in this species.

==== Other possible species ====
Two species of agriotheriin bears, A. roblesi and I. punjabensis might belong to Huracan as well based on overall similarities of their molars. In the case of I. punjabensis is sister to the Agriotherium–Huracan clade.

== Description ==
The short rostrum, resulting in increased out-forces of the jaw-closing muscles (temporalis and masseter), may have been an adaptation for cracking bones with their broad carnassials. Such use of the P4 and m1 teeth is supported by the heavy wear on these teeth in old individuals of Huracan and Arctodus simus (another giant bear). The low relative grinding area of the molars also suggests a carnivorous diet, although the omni-herbivorous spectacled bear also shares this characteristic.

== Paleobiology ==
=== Diet ===
Jiangzou et al. suggested that this genus had a greater adaptation for a carnivorous diet than Indarctos, with isotopic analysis from Yepómera (Chihuahua) suggesting a carnivorous diet based on C_{4} consuming ungulates. Despite this, isotope data from Optima (Oklahoma) suggests that Huracan was possibly omnivorous much like modern bears.
