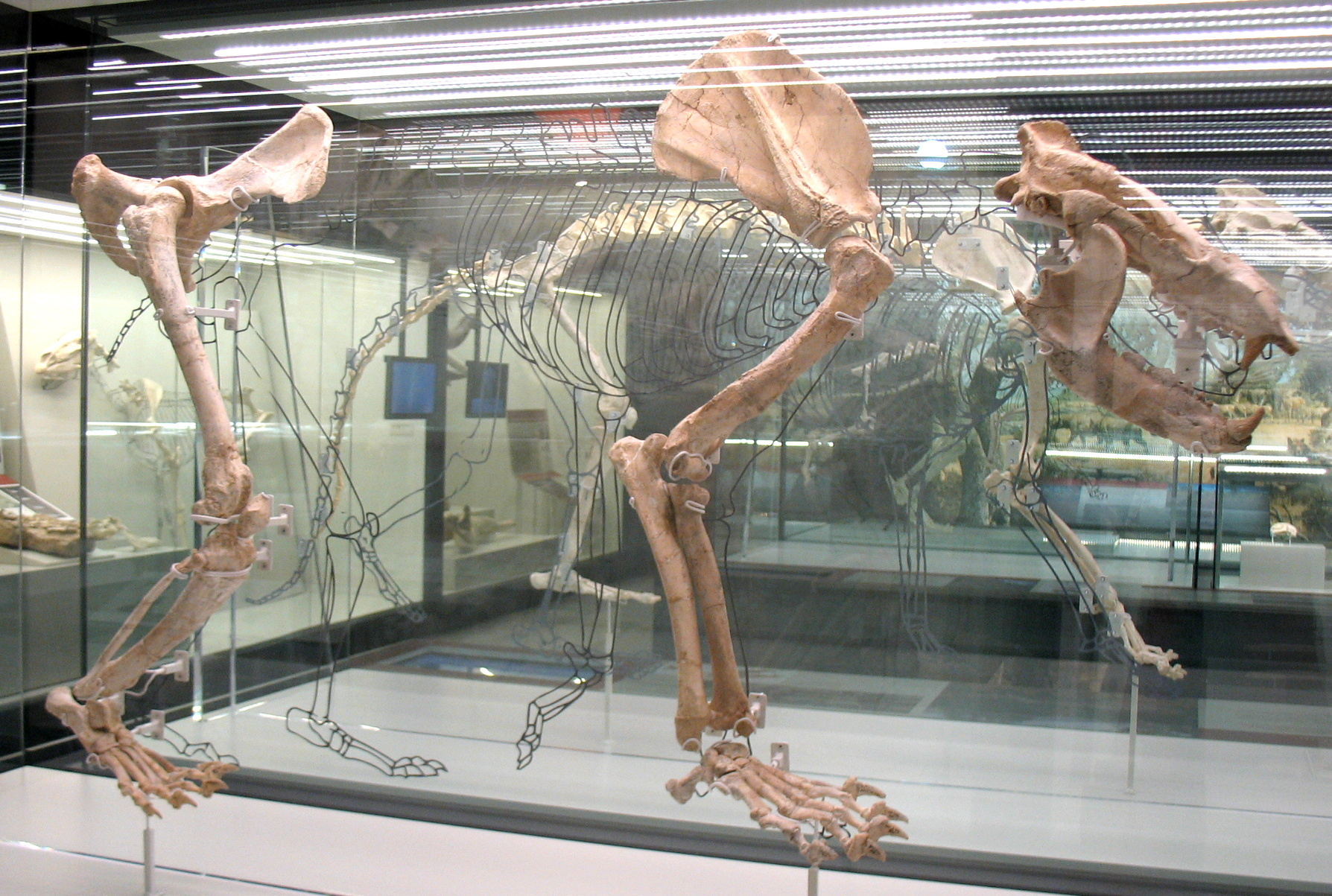
- Skeletal remains of Indarctos arctoides displayed in National Archaeological Museum (Madrid)

Scientific classification
- Kingdom: Animalia
- Phylum: Chordata
- Class: Mammalia
- Order: Carnivora
- Family: Ursidae
- Subfamily: Ailuropodinae
- Tribe: †Agriotheriini; Hendey, 1972

Genera
- †Agriotherium; †Huracan; †Indarctos; †Miomaci?

Synonyms
- Agriotheriinae Kretzoi, 1929; Indarctini Abella et al., 2012

= Agriotheriini =

Agriotheriini Temporal range: Late Miocene—Early Pleistocene 11.5–1.8 Ma

Tribe of bears

Agriotheriini is an extinct tribe of ailuropodine bears from the middle Neogene to early Quaternary periods, with fossils found from Eurasia, Africa, and North America.

== Taxonomy ==
The tribe Agriotheriini consists of the three (perhaps four) genera

- Agriotherium
- Huracan
- Indarctos
- Miomaci (possibly).

The taxonomy of these bears has variously placed some of the genera in other bear lineages such as Hemicyoninae and Ursavinae.

Recent papers support their inclusion with giant pandas as members of Ailuropodinae based on diagnostic features like

- large cheek teeth
- parastyle fourth premolar with an enlarged inner lobe
- wide first and second molars being
- high mandible, with respect to the lower tooth row.

They are unlike their closest living relative, the giant panda (Ailuropoda melanoleuca) which evolved into a highly specialized bamboo-eater: The evolution of agriotheriins lead to the group becoming large, hypercarnivorous bears that had adaptations of cursoriality unique in the evolutionary history of bears.

== Ichnotaxa ==
The ichnotaxon Platykopus (sometimes spelt Platycopus) has sometimes been ascribed to Agriotheriini; a large ursid trackway assigned to Platykopus stuartjohnsoni from late Miocene Texas was tentatively assigned to Huracan coffeyi, due to H. coffeyi remains being present at the same formation (Coffee Ranch Quarry), and their similarity to Agriotherium africanum footbones from South Africa. The type species Platykopus ilycalcator was first recovered from late Miocene Nevada, and has also been described from the Oligocene & Miocene of Iran. Platykopus maxima has been recovered from Hungary, however researchers believe these trackways are of amphicyonid origin due to their early Miocene age.

Though both ichnotaxon are large-sized plantigrade footprints with five digits, Platykopus is distinct from the ichnotaxon Ursichnus (ursine and tremarctine bears). The oval digit imprints are usually connected to the palm/sole and close to the pad, sometimes with double lobed phalangian pads instead of one. Digit I is central and often the most deeply impressed, with subsequent digits forming a symmetrical arc around the palm/sole. The metatarsal imprint is underdeveloped in the palm, making the foot longer and narrower. Unlike other ursids, the manus and foot proportions and pads of Platykopus are nearly 1:1; the tracks are smaller than other ursids (maximum foot length of 25cm), with a maximum foot length of 13.5cm. Absent in Platykopus are primitive hallux imprints behind manus tracks, with claw imprints are only being slightly visible, similar to brown bear tracks.
