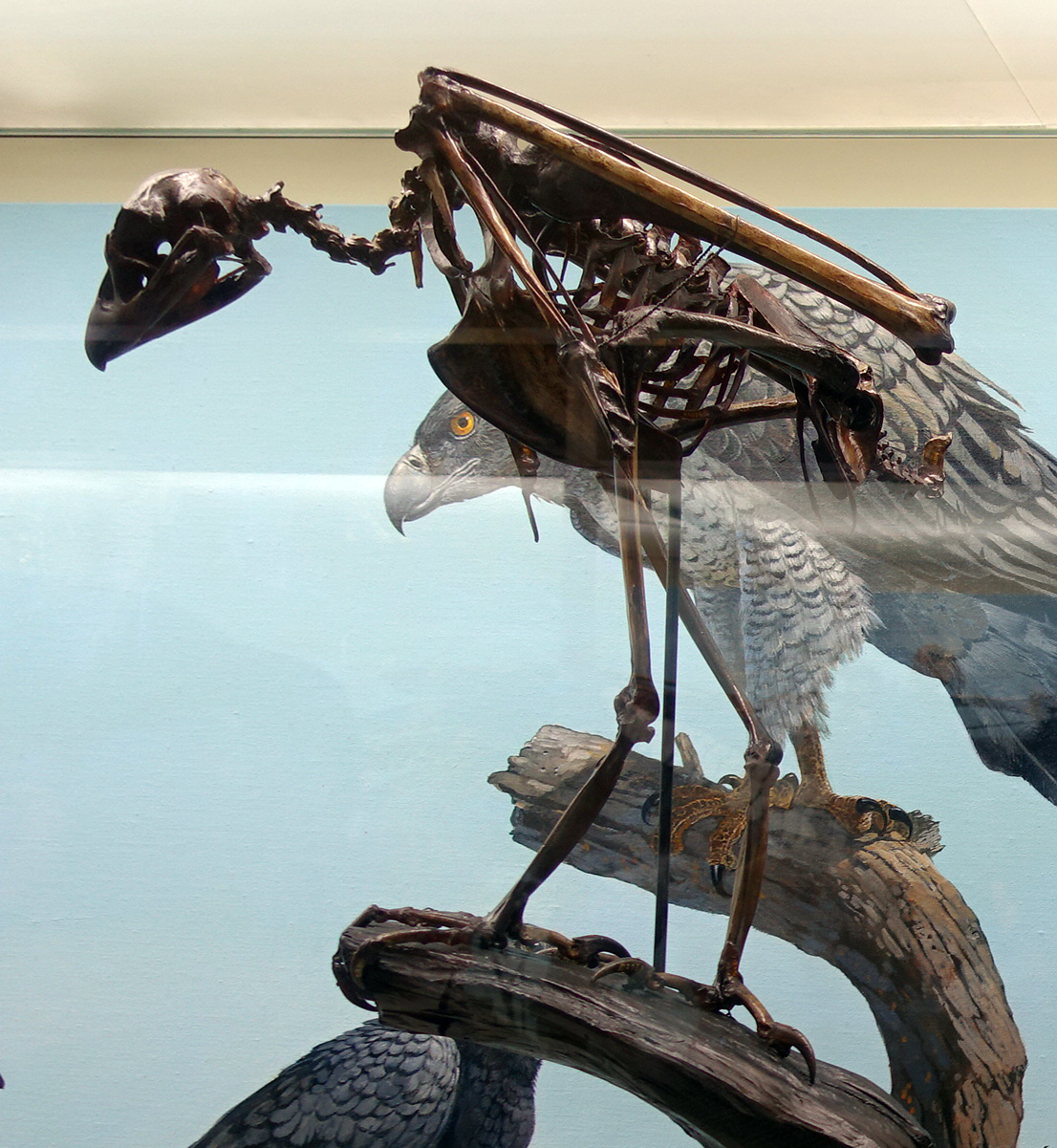
- Amplibuteo woodwardi skeleton from the La Brea Tar Pits

Scientific classification
- Kingdom: Animalia
- Phylum: Chordata
- Class: Aves
- Order: Accipitriformes
- Family: Accipitridae
- Genus: †Amplibuteo; Campbell, 1979

Species
- †Amplibuteo concordatus Emslie & Czaplewski, 1999; †Amplibuteo hibbardi Campbell, 1979; †Amplibuteo woodwardi (Miller, 1911)

= Amplibuteo =

Amplibuteo Temporal range: Pleistocene

Extinct genus of birds

Amplibuteo is an extinct genus of birds of prey, belonging to the family Accipitridae.
