= Trigonictis macrodon =

Trigonictis macrodon Temporal range: Pliocene–Pleistocene

Scientific classification
- Kingdom: Animalia
- Phylum: Chordata
- Class: Mammalia
- Order: Carnivora
- Family: Mustelidae
- Genus: †Trigonictis
- Species: †T. macrodon

Binomial name
- †Trigonictis macrodon Cope, 1868

Extinct species of carnivore

Trigonictis macrodon is an extinct species of mammal related to the living grison (genus Galictis). It lived in North America during the Pliocene to Pleistocene epochs, from ~4.1–1.6 Ma. (AEO), existing for approximately 2.5 million years. Fossil specimens have been found across the United States, from Washington and Oregon in the northwest to California and Florida in the south.

== Morphology and diet ==
Trigonictis is most closely related to the modern neotropical galictines, Sminthosinis and possibly Canimartes. According to Kurtén and Anderson, Trigonictis macrodon was about the size of the modern fisher, quickly moving and very capable of swimming. It was closely related to a group of galictine mustelids and reached the New World in the Middle Pliocene. Its diet was probably the rabbit Hypolagus, ground squirrels, and young beavers.

== Bibliography ==
- Y. Tomida. 1987. Small mammal fossils and correlation of continental deposits, Safford and Duncan basins, Arizona. National Science Museum 1-141.PaloDB
