= Amplibuteo concordatus =

Amplibuteo concordatus Temporal range: 2.58800 - 0.78100 Ma

Scientific classification
- Kingdom: Animalia
- Phylum: Chordata
- Class: Aves
- Order: Accipitriformes
- Family: Accipitridae
- Genus: †Amplibuteo
- Species: †A. concordatus

Binomial name
- †Amplibuteo concordatus Steven D. Emsile & Nicholas J. Czaplewski, 1999

Extinct species of bird

Amplibuteo concordatus is an extinct species of bird of prey in the family Accipitridae. It is one of three species in the extinct genus Amplibuteo.

== Discovery and naming ==
=== Discovery ===
Around 10 specimens of A. concordatus were found ranging from Florida to Arizona with being dated to the Late Pliocene.

=== Etymology ===
The scientific name concordatus refers to Latin word concordat which means a formal agreement, referencing the similarity of the Florida and Arizona localities.

== Description ==
A.concordatus differs from other species in the genus by have a relatively large metacarpal with no proximal curvature, while also have a deep and narrow fossa inside the metacarpal. Its coracoid has relatively short and narrow coraco-humeral surface. Its scapholunar facet is also relatively short and narrow.
