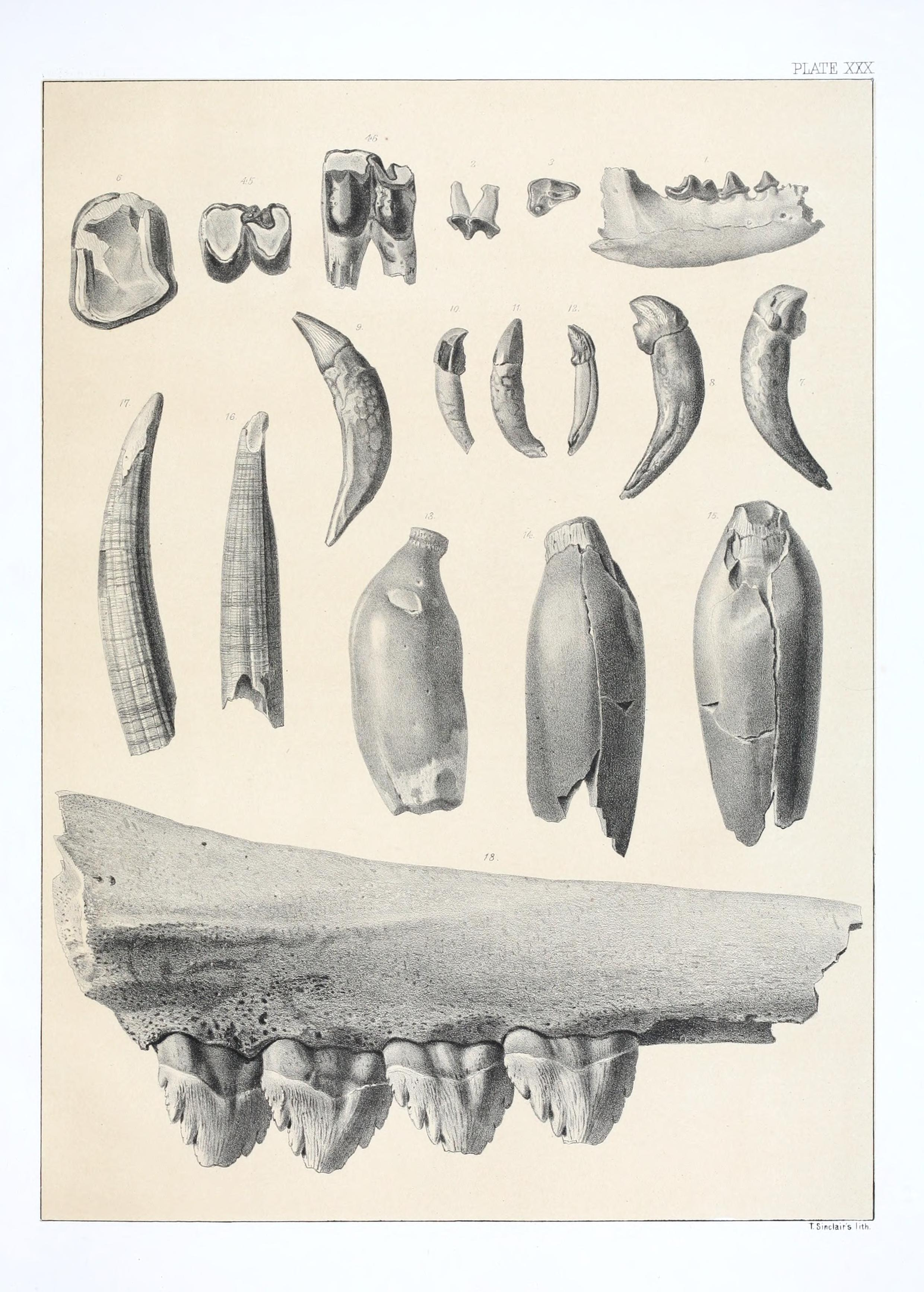
- Trigonictis fossils (top row)

Scientific classification
- Kingdom: Animalia
- Phylum: Chordata
- Class: Mammalia
- Order: Carnivora
- Family: Mustelidae
- Subfamily: Ictonychinae
- Genus: †Trigonictis; Cope, 1868

Type species
- †Trigonictis macrodon

Other Species
- T. cookii

= Trigonictis =

Trigonictis Temporal range: Pliocene– Early Pleistocene

Extinct genus of mustelid

Trigonictis is an extinct genus of mustelid related to the living grison. It lived in North America during the Pliocene to Pleistocene. Fossil specimens have been found across the United States, from Washington and Oregon in the northwest to California and Florida in the south.

Two species are known; Trigonictis macrodon and Trigonictis cookii.
