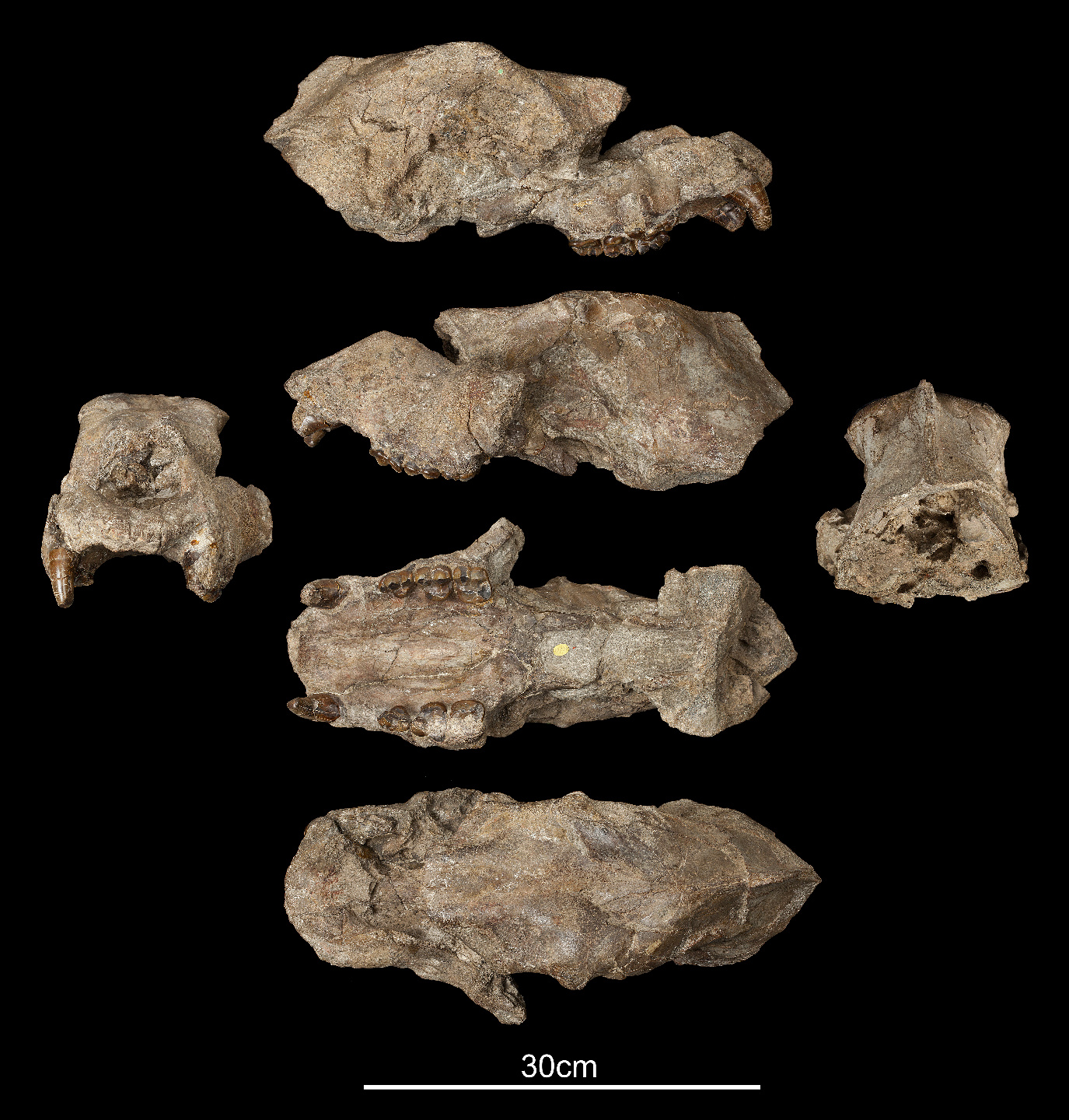
- Cranium of A. sivalensis in different views

Scientific classification
- Kingdom: Animalia
- Phylum: Chordata
- Class: Mammalia
- Order: Carnivora
- Family: Ursidae
- Tribe: †Agriotheriini
- Genus: †Agriotherium; Wagner, 1837

Type species
- †Ursus sivalensis (= †Agriotherium sivalensis) Falconer & Cautley, 1836

Species
- †A. myanmarensis (Ogino et al., 2011) †A. insigne (Gervais, 1859) †A. inexpetans (Qiu et al., 1991) †A. palaeindicus (Lydekker, 1878) †A. sivalensis (Falconer & Cautley, 1836) †A. africanum (Hendey, 1972) †A. hendeyi Jiangzuo and Flynn, 2019

= Agriotherium =

Agriotherium Temporal range: Late Miocene (Tortonian) to Early Pleistocene (Gelasian), 7.6–1.8 Ma

Extinct genus of bears

Agriotherium is an extinct genus of bears whose fossils are found in Miocene through Pleistocene-aged strata of Eurasia and Africa. The earliest species, A. inexpetans, evolved during the Late Miocene, around 7.6 Mya. The latest record for the genus was around 1.8 Mya, during the Early Pleistocene.

== Description and diet ==
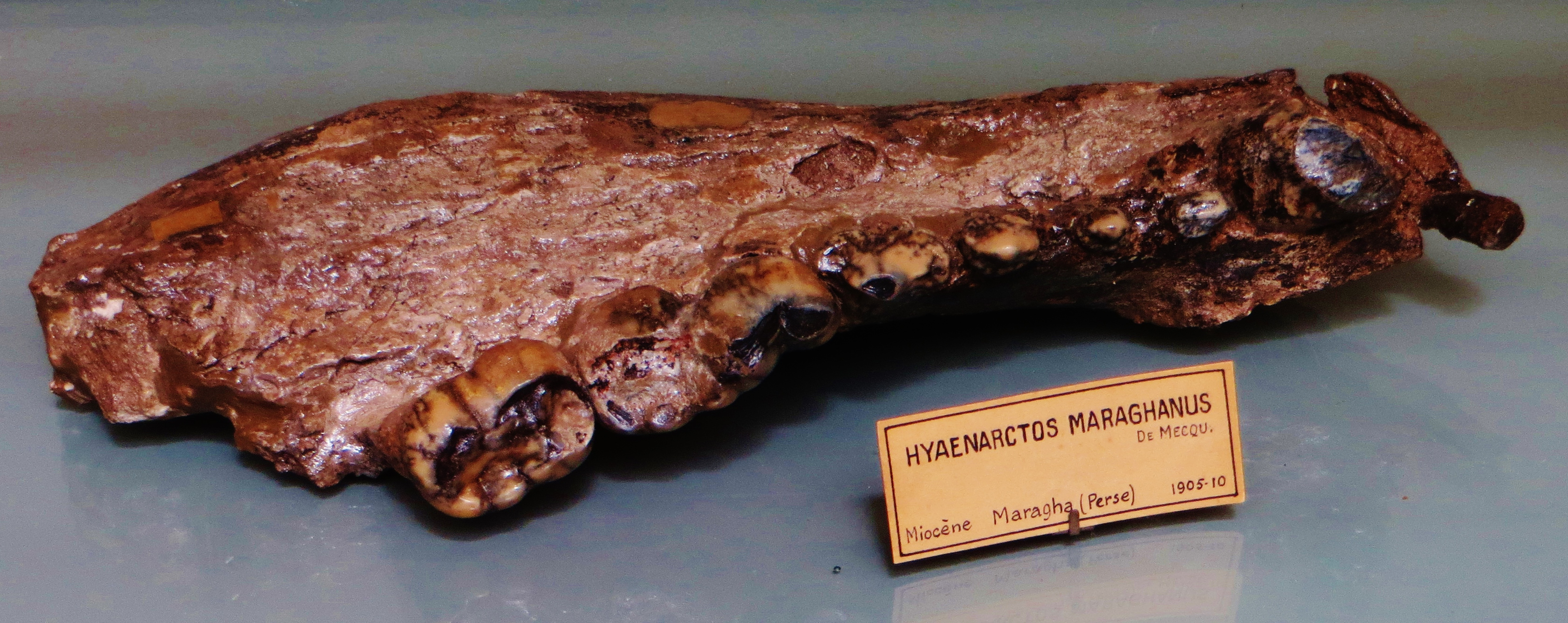
Mandible at the Gallery of Paleontology and Comparative Anatomy, (Paris).

A. africanum measured around 2 metres (7 ft) in body length and weighed up to 750 kilograms (1,650 lb), making it larger than most living bears; however, mass estimates vary, with further studies presenting a lower mass estimate of 317–540 kilograms (699–1,190 lb). Along with other large bears, such as the cave bear, the short-faced bears Arctodus and Arctotherium, and an extinct subspecies of the modern polar bear Ursus maritimus tyrannus, Agriotherium was among the largest known terrestrial members of Carnivora. They had longer legs and shorter faces than other bears, and were more lightly built. Their wide, short jaws could generate enormous bite force. It is not certain how this force was used by the living animal; a study designed to determine how the genus fed discovered that, among living bears, the lowest bite force belongs to the predatory polar bear, which feeds largely on blubber, and the highest bite force belongs to the giant panda, a herbivore that uses it to crush bamboo. Shortened jaws with high bite forces are found in other mammals like Gelada baboons that eat grasses but evolved from non-grazing ancestors, and in bone-crushing scavengers, like spotted hyenas and borophagine dogs.

== Palaeoecology ==
Analysis of the teeth, jaw, and tooth wear patterns identifies Agriotherium as an omnivore that ate a lot of plant material as well as being an apex predator. Though its teeth do not show adaptations for a carnivorous diet, isotope evidence suggests it did eat a significant amount of animal material, similar to some populations of modern brown bears. Several studies of the skeleton, including a comparison with Hemicyon ursinus, a fossil bear widely accepted as a predator, show that Agriotherium did not have the limb strength or speed needed for active hunting, either by ambush or by chasing down prey. It also did not show the long claws and increased forelimb strength typical of mammals that dig for food. These very large bears may have specialized on a combination of grazing, eating fruit and invertebrate food in season, and intimidating predators away from carcasses in order to scavenge meat and bone marrow. Analysis of δ^{13}C and δ^{18}O of an Agriotherium myanmarensis specimen from Chaingzauk suggests that this species was mainly carnivorous and that it ate a diverse array of both C_{3} consuming and C_{4} consuming herbivores.

== Fossil distribution ==
Sites and age of specimens:

- Venta del Moro, Spain 6.2–6.1 Ma.
- Lang. E Quarry, South Africa ~5.3–3.6 Ma.
- Vialette, Haute Loire, France ~3.2–2.5 Ma.
- Middle Awash, Ethiopia ~11.6–3.6 Ma.

Agriotherium ranged widely; fossils of four or more species have been found in Europe, India, Myanmar, China, and South Africa. It is the only ursoid known to have lived in sub-Saharan Africa. The last reported record of the genus in Africa was 4 Ma.

== Sources ==
- Dalquest, W. W. (1986). "Lower Jaw and Dentition of the Hemphillian Bear, Agriotherium (Ursidae), with the Description of a New Species". Journal of Mammalogy. 67 (4): 623–631. doi:10.2307/1381124. JSTOR 1381124.
- Miller, W. E.; Carranza-Castañeda, O.; Carranza-Castaneda, Oscar (1996). "Agriotherium schneideri from the Hemphillian of Central Mexico". Journal of Mammalogy. 77 (2): 568–577. doi:10.2307/1382830. JSTOR 1382830.
- Petter, G.; Thomas, H. (1986). "Les Agriotheriinae (Mammalia, Carnivora)néogènes de l'Ancien Monde presence du genre Indarctos dans la faune de Menacer (ex−Marceau), Algérie". Geobios. 19 (5): 573–586. Bibcode:1986Geobi..19..573P. doi:10.1016/s0016-6995(86)80055-9.
- Sorkin, B. (2006). "Ecomorphology of the giant short-faced bears Agriotherium and Arctodus". Historical Biology. 18: 1–20. doi:10.1080/08912960500476366. S2CID 85301983.
