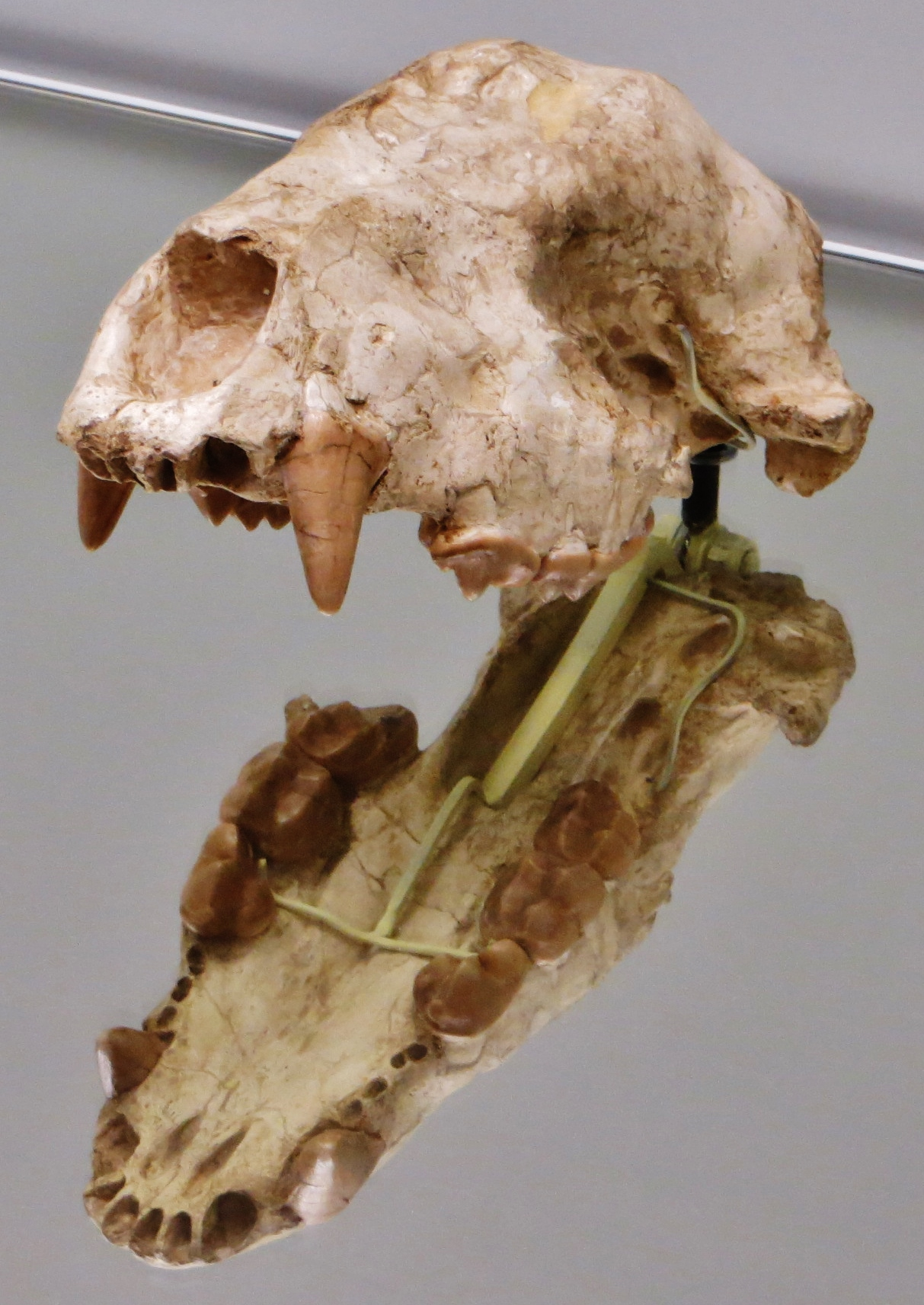
- I. atticus skull, Natural History Museum of Basel

Scientific classification
- Kingdom: Animalia
- Phylum: Chordata
- Class: Mammalia
- Order: Carnivora
- Family: Ursidae
- Tribe: †Agriotheriini
- Genus: †Indarctos; Pilgrim, 1913

Type species
- †Indarctos salmontanus Pilgrim, 1913

Species
- †I. punjabiensis (Lydekker, 1884) †I. zdanskyi (Qiu & Tedford, 2003) †I. sinensis (Zdansky, 1924) †I. vireti (Villalta & Crusafont, 1943) †I. arctoides (Deperet, 1895) †I. anthracitis (Weithofer, 1888) †I. salmontanus (Pilgrim, 1913) †I. atticus (Weithofer, 1888) †I. bakalovi (Kovachev, 1988) †I. lagrelli (Zdansky, 1924) †I. oregonensis (Merriam et al., 1916) †I. nevadensis (Macdonald, 1959)

= Indarctos =

Indarctos Temporal range: Miocene, 11.1–5.3 Ma

Extinct genus of bears

Indarctos is an extinct genus of bear, present in Africa, North America, and Eurasia during the Miocene. It was present from ~11.1 to 5.3 Ma, existing for approximately 6.2 million years.

The oldest member is from Arizona (~11.1—7.7 Ma) and youngest is (~9.0—5.3 Ma) from Kazakhstan. In North America this animal was contemporary with Plionarctos (~10.3—3.3 Ma).

== Discovery, history and taxonomy ==
=== Discoveries ===
A molar (designated to MNA 1839/km-83) discovered from the Karabulak formation in 1988 was tentatively assigned to Indarctos sp. In 2017 it was re examined and assigned to I. punjabensis. The tooth was found to belong to a young individual, which may be a male, and is the largest tooth known from the species. This might be due to sexual dimorphism since extant male bears are larger than the females.

=== Species ===
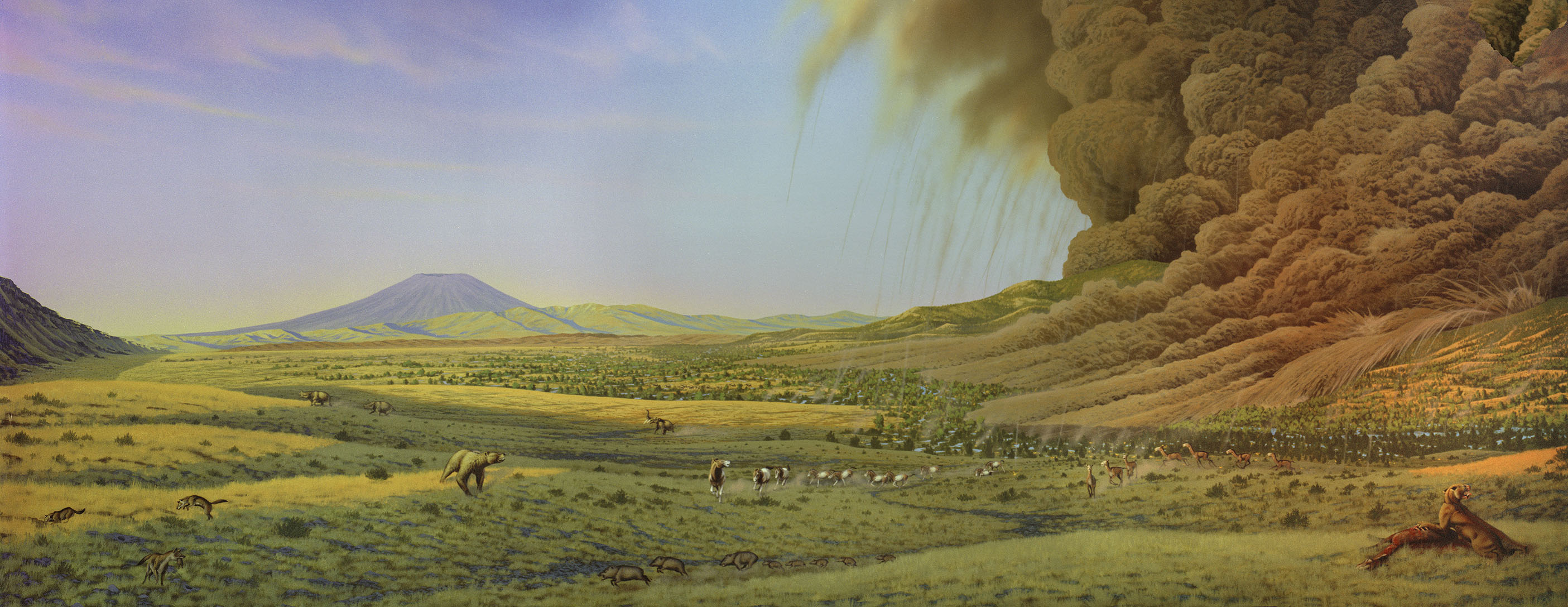
Restoration of I. oregonensis (left) and other animals of the Rattlesnake Formation

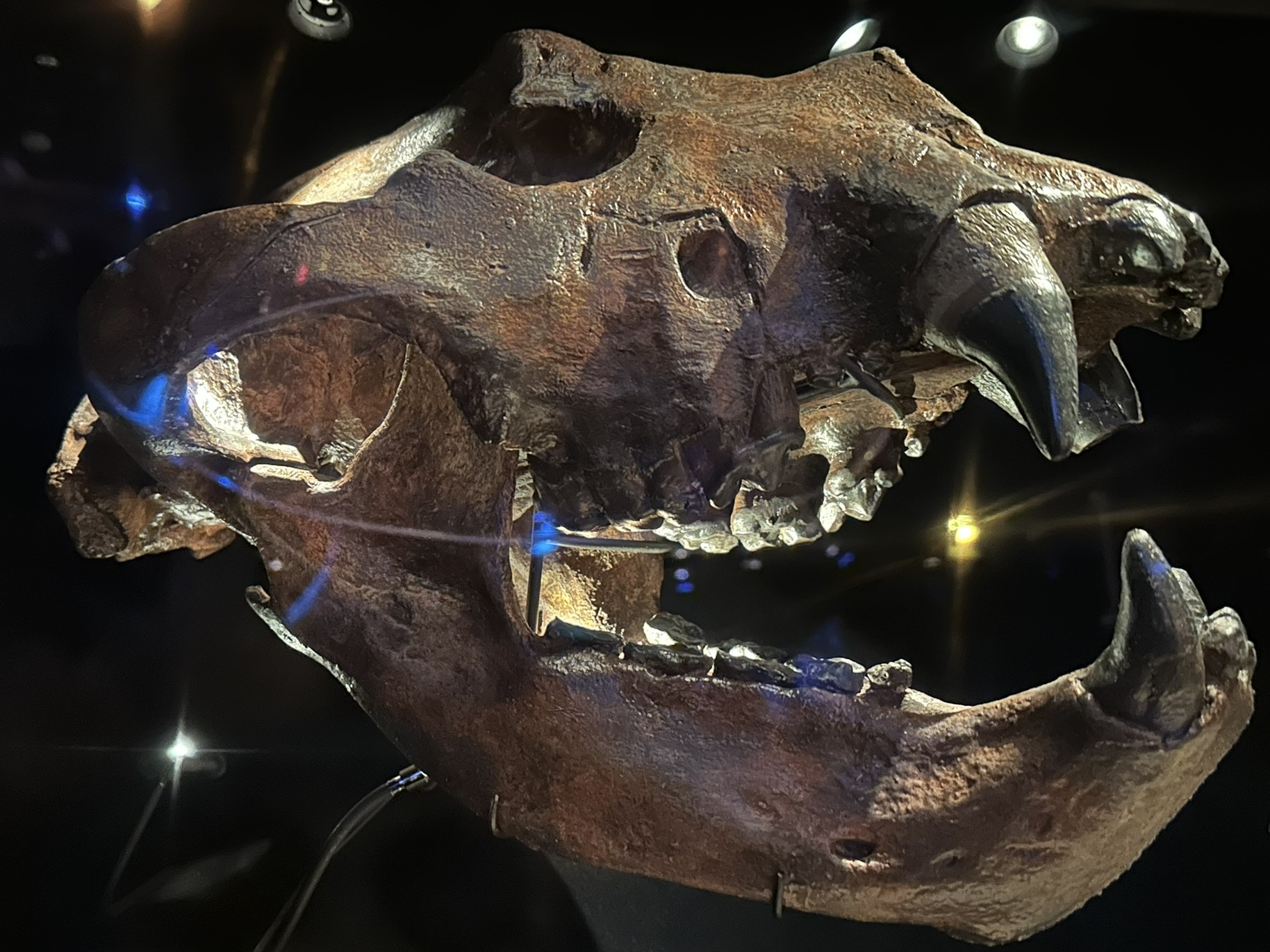
Fossil skull cast of I. oregonensis, Florida Museum of Natural History

Indarctos is known from several species spread widely across Eurasia, North America, and North Africa, however, most of them are known from fragmentary remains which leaves us with insufficient knowledge of the anatomy, lifestyle, taxonomy and paleoecology of some species. These species are usually established based on poor remains, where the presence of sexual dimorphism, paleogeographical variation and individual variation is not taken into account, resulting in a number of species whose taxonomic validity is doubted.

The following are some species of this genus:

I. arctoides: This species had an omnivorous diet, and it was ancestral to the later I. punjabensis.

I. punjabiensis: This species is the geologically youngest and last species of Indarctos. It had a wide distribution 6.3–6.5 Ma during the Late Miocene, across Eurasia. It is known from the Karabulak formation of Kazakhstan, to China and the Dhon Pathan formation of Indo-Pakistan. It descended from the earlier I. arctoides, but unlike its ancestor, it was omnivorous and bigger in size. Based on the resemblance of its forelimbs to those of the modern brown bear, it possibly had similar locomotor adaptations. Evolutionary features such as this led to the migration of Indarctos-like bears into North America. At the end of the Late Miocene, Indarctos punjabiensis went extinct as the last species of its genus.

== Description ==
I. arctoides was sexually dimorphic with males weighing 265 kg (584 lb), while females weighed 137 kg (302 lb).

== Distribution ==
A baculum from I. arctoides.

Some sites and specimen ages:

- Box T Site, Lipscomb County, Texas ~9.3—9.2 Ma.
- Rattlesnake site, Grant County, Oregon ~10.3—4.9 Ma.
- Withlacoochee River Site 4A, Marion County, Florida (Indarctos sp.) ~10.3—4.9 Ma.
- Lufeng, Yunnan, China (I. atticus) ~9—5.3 Ma.
- Yulafli (CY), Thrace, Turkey (I. arctoides) ~9.7—8.7 Ma.
- Batallones-3, Madrid Basin, Spain (I. arctoides) ~11.6—5.3 Ma.

== Paleoecology ==
Enamel δ^{13}C values from fossilised teeth of I. arctoides from Cerro de los Batallones in Spain show that it was an omnivore with a preference for carnivory over herbivory. Dental microwear reveals that I. anthracitis was a specialist that consumed invertebrate prey.

In Kazakhstan, the species I. punjabiensis is known from the Karabulak formation which dates to 6.3–6.5 Ma (Late Miocene). It coexisted with three mustelids (Martes sp., Promeles sp., Plesiogulo crassa Teilhard), three feliforms (Adcrocuta eximia, Hyaenictitherium hyaenoides orlovi, Amphimachairodus kurteni), four perissodactyls (Hipparion hippidiodus, H. elegans, Chilotherium sp., Sinotherium zaisanensis), and six artiodactyls (Cervavitus novorossiae, Procapreolus latifrons, Samotherium cf. irtyshense, Paleotragus (Yuorlovia) asiaticus, Tragoportax sp., Gazella dorcadoides). The climate that Indarctos punjabensis lived in was mild and arid. It was a habitat of wide, open steppes.

In the Late Miocene Litra Formation of Pakistan, I. cf. atticus inhabited an open environment characterised by monsoonal seasonality and the presence of C_{4} grasses.
