= List of ursids =

Species in mammal family Ursidae

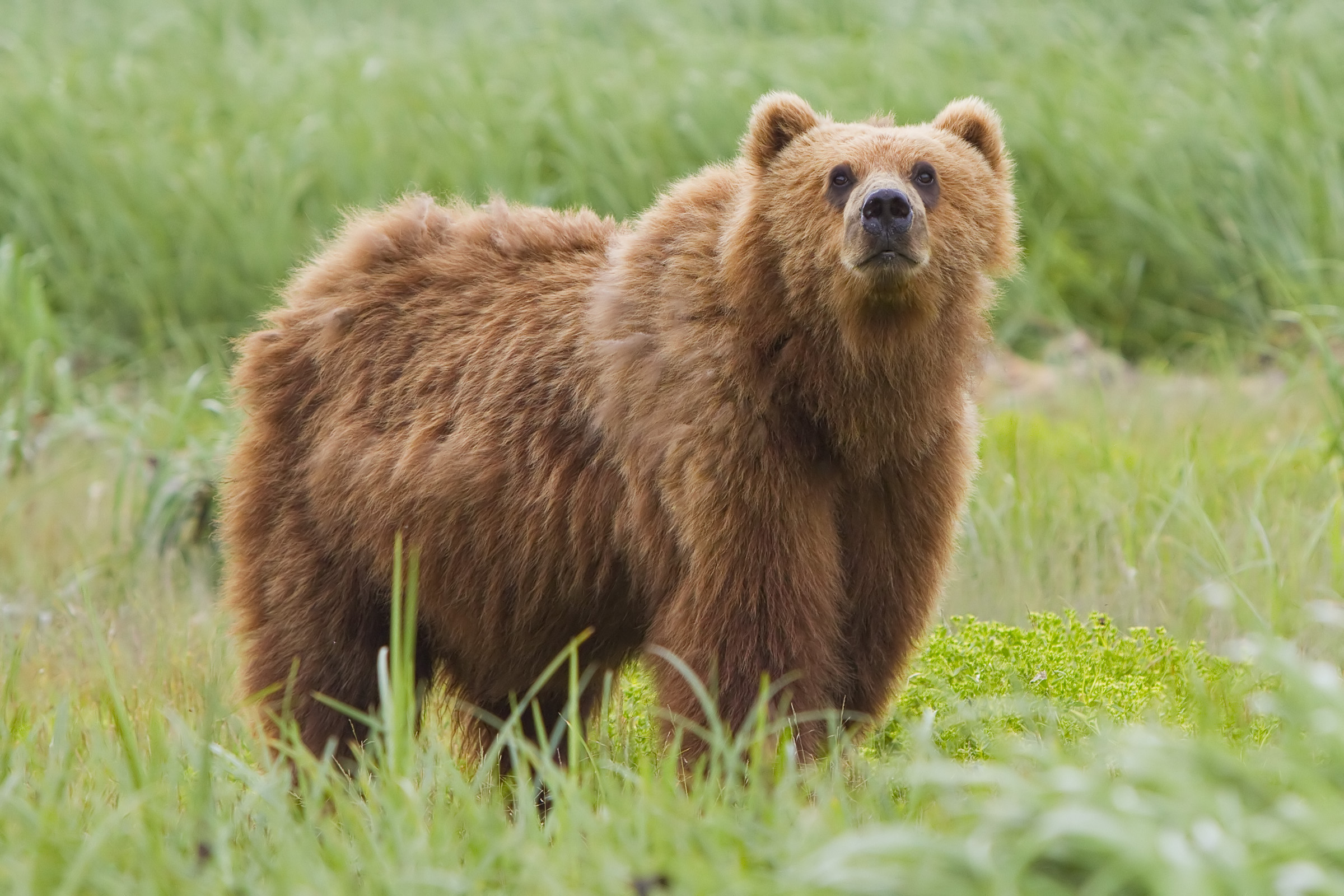
Brown bear (Ursus arctos)

Ursidae is a family of mammals in the order Carnivora, which includes the giant panda, brown bear, and polar bear, and many other extant or extinct mammals. A member of this family is called a bear or an ursid. They are widespread across the Americas and Eurasia. Bear habitats are generally forests, though some species can be found in grassland and savana regions, and the polar bear lives in arctic and aquatic habitats. Most bears are 1.2–2 m (4–7 ft) long, plus a 3–20 cm (1–8 in) tail, though the polar bear is 2.2–2.44 m (7–8 ft) long, and some subspecies of brown bear can be up to 2.8 m (9 ft). Weights range greatly from the sun bear, which can be as low as 35 kg (77 lb), to the polar bear, which can be as high as 726 kg (1,600 lb). Population sizes vary, with six species classified as vulnerable with populations as low as 500, while the brown bear has a population of over 100,000 and the American black bear around 800,000. Many bear species primarily eat specific foods, such as seals for the polar bear or termites and fruit for the sloth bear, but with the exception of the giant panda, which exclusively eats bamboo, ursids are omnivorous when necessary. No ursid species have been domesticated, though some bears have been trained for entertainment.

The eight species of Ursidae are split into five genera in three subfamilies: the monotypic Ailuropodinae, the panda bears; Tremarctinae, the short-faced bears; and Ursinae, containing all other extant bears. Extinct species have also been placed into all three extant subfamilies, as well as three extinct ones: Agriotheriinae, Hemicyoninae, and Ursavinae. Over 100 extinct Ursidae species have been found, though due to ongoing research and discoveries the exact number and categorization is not fixed.

== Conventions ==
IUCN Red List categories
Conservation status
- EX: Extinct (0 species)
- EW: Extinct in the wild (0 species)
- CR: Critically endangered (0 species)
- EN: Endangered (0 species)
- VU: Vulnerable (6 species)
- NT: Near threatened (0 species)
- LC: Least concern (2 species)

The author citation for the species or genus is given after the scientific name; parentheses around the author citation indicate that this was not the original taxonomic placement. Conservation status codes listed follow the International Union for Conservation of Nature (IUCN) Red List of Threatened Species. Ranges are based on the IUCN Red List for that species unless otherwise noted. All extinct species or subspecies listed alongside extant species went extinct after 1500 CE, and are indicated by a dagger symbol "†". Population figures are rounded to the nearest hundred.

== Classification ==
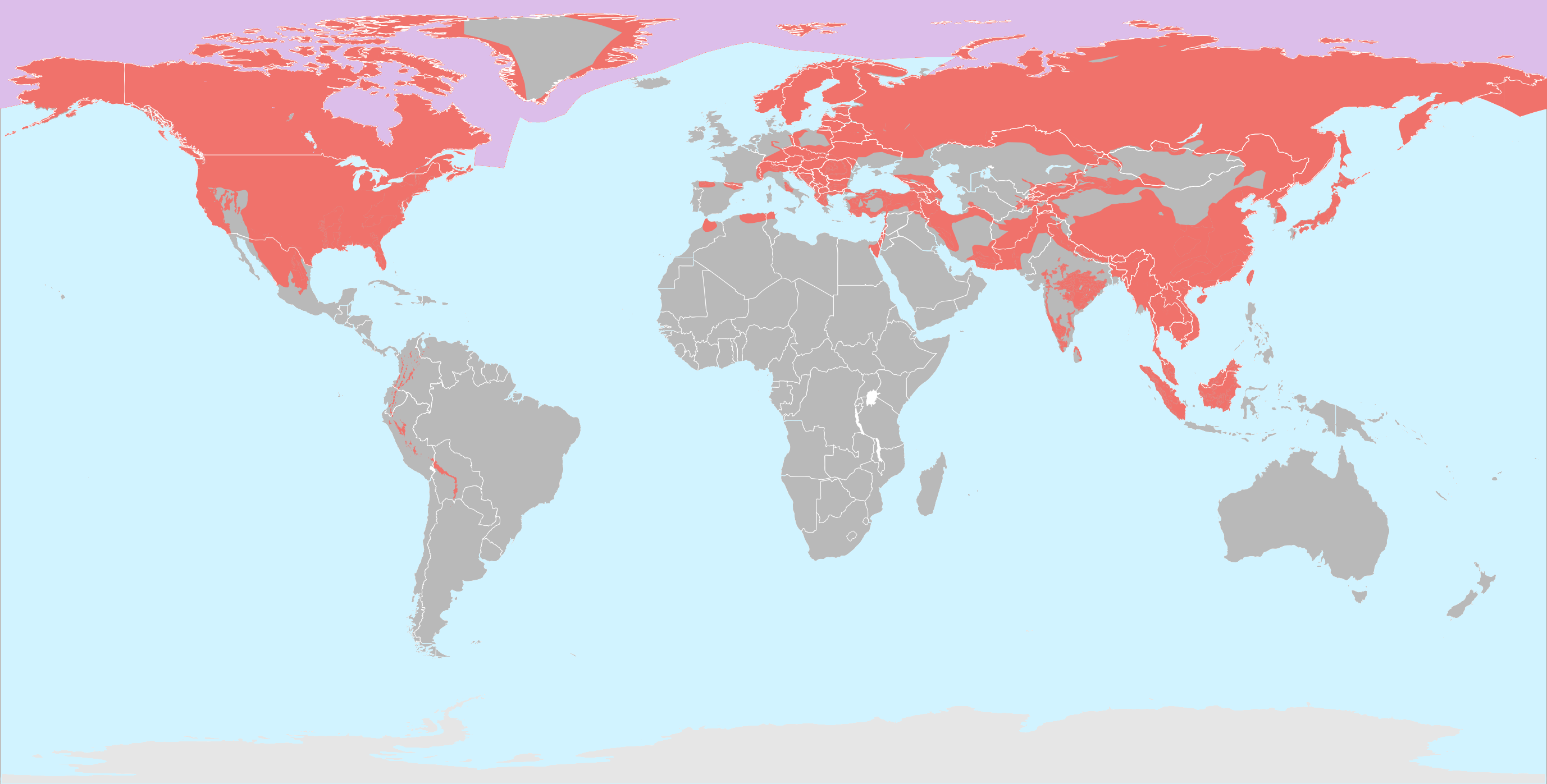
Ursidae distribution

The family Ursidae consists of eight extant species belonging to five genera in three subfamilies and divided into dozens of subspecies. This does not include ursid hybrid species such as grizzly–polar bear hybrids or extinct prehistoric species.

- Subfamily Ailuropodinae
  - Genus Ailuropoda (panda bears): one species
- Subfamily Tremarctinae
  - Genus Tremarctos (short-faced bears): one species
- Subfamily Ursinae
  - Genus Helarctos: (sun bear): one species
  - Genus Melursus: (sloth bear): one species
  - Genus Ursus (bears): four species

- Ursidae
  - - Ursinae
      - - Ursus (American black / Asian black / brown / polar bear)
        - Helarctos (sun bear)
      - Melursus (sloth bear)
    - Tremarctinae
      Tremarctos (spectacled bear)
  - - Ailuropodinae
      Ailuropoda (giant panda)

== Ursids ==
The following classification is based on the taxonomy described by Mammal Species of the World (2005), with augmentation by generally accepted proposals made since using molecular phylogenetic analysis; this includes the division of the giant panda into two subspecies. There are several additional proposals which are disputed, such as reclassifying the subspecies of the brown bear into a smaller set of clades, which are not included here.

=== Subfamily Ailuropodinae ===
Genus Ailuropoda – H. Milne-Edwards, 1870 – one species
Common name	Scientific name and subspecies	Range	Size and ecology	IUCN status and estimated population
Giant panda	A. melanoleuca (David, 1869) Two subspecies: A. m. melanoleuca; A. m. qinlingensis (Qinling panda)	Central China, usually in bamboo forests	Size: 150–180 cm (59–71 in) long, plus 10–15 cm (4–6 in) tail 80–123 kg (176–271 lb) Habitat: Forest Diet: Eats only bamboo	VU 500–1,000

=== Subfamily Tremarctinae ===
Genus Tremarctos – Gervais, 1855 – one species
Common name	Scientific name and subspecies	Range	Size and ecology	IUCN status and estimated population
Spectacled bear	T. ornatus (F. Cuvier, 1825)	Andes mountains in South America	Size: 120–200 cm (47–79 in) long, plus 7 cm (3 in) tail 60–175 kg (132–386 lb) Habitat: Shrubland, grassland, and forest Diet: Primarily eats bromeliads and palm trees, as well as cattle, other mammals, and fruit	VU 2,500–10,000

=== Subfamily Ursinae ===
Genus Helarctos – Horsfield, 1825 – one species
Common name	Scientific name and subspecies	Range	Size and ecology	IUCN status and estimated population
Sun bear	H. malayanus (Raffles, 1821) Two subspecies: H. m. euryspilus (Bornean sun bear); H. m. malayanus (Malayan sun bear)	Southeast Asia (current range in brown, former in black)	Size: 120–150 cm (47–59 in) long, plus 3–7 cm (1–3 in) tail 35–80 kg (77–176 lb) Habitat: Forest and shrubland Diet: Primarily eats termites, ants, beetle larvae, bee larvae, honey, and fruit	VU 50,000

Genus Melursus – Meyer, 1793 – one species
Common name	Scientific name and subspecies	Range	Size and ecology	IUCN status and estimated population
Sloth bear	M. ursinus (Shaw, 1791) Two subspecies: M. u. inornatus (Sri Lankan sloth bear); M. u. ursinus (Indian sloth bear)	India (current range in green, former in black)	Size: 150–180 cm (59–71 in) long, plus 7–12 cm (3–5 in) tail 54–141 kg (119–311 lb) Habitat: Shrubland, grassland, forest, and savanna Diet: Primarily eats termites and fruit	VU 6,000–20,000

Genus Ursus – Linnaeus, 1758 – four species
Common name	Scientific name and subspecies	Range	Size and ecology	IUCN status and estimated population
American black bear	U. americanus Pallas, 1780 Sixteen subspecies: U. a. altifrontalis (Olympic black bear); U. a. amblyceps (New Mexico black bear); U. a. americanus (Eastern black bear); U. a. californiensis (California black bear); U. a. carlottae (Haida Gwaii black bear); U. a. cinnamomum (Cinnamon bear); U. a. emmonsii (Glacier bear); U. a. eremicus (East Mexican black bear); U. a. floridanus (Florida black bear); U. a. hamiltoni (Newfoundland black bear); U. a. kermodei (Kermode bear); U. a. luteolus (Louisiana black bear); U. a. machetes (West Mexican black bear); U. a. perniger (Kenai black bear); U. a. pugnax (Dall Island black bear); U. a. vancouveri (Vancouver Island black bear)	North America (current range in red, former in pink)	Size: 120–200 cm (47–79 in) long, plus 8–14 cm (3–6 in) tail 39–409 kg (86–902 lb) Habitat: Forest, inland wetlands, grassland, shrubland, and desert Diet: Omnivorous; eats vegetation, roots, buds, fruit, nuts, insects, fish, mammals, and carrion	LC 735,000–941,000
Asian black bear	U. thibetanus Cuvier, 1823 Seven subspecies: U. t. formosanus (Formosan black bear); U. t. gedrosianus (Balochistan black bear); U. t. japonicus (Japanese black bear); U. t. laniger (Himalayan black bear); U. t. mupinensis (Indochinese black bear); U. t. thibetanus (Tibetan black bear); U. t. ussuricus (Ussuri black bear)	South and East Asia (current range in brown, former in black)	Size: 120–180 cm (47–71 in) long, plus 6–11 cm (2–4 in) tail 65–150 kg (143–331 lb) Habitat: Forest, inland wetlands, grassland, and shrubland Diet: Eats vegetation, insects, fruit, nuts, ungulates, and livestock	VU 50,000
Brown bear	U. arctos Linnaeus, 1758 Sixteen subspecies: U. a. alascensis (Alaskan grizzly bear); U. a. arctos (Eurasian brown bear); U. a. beringianus (Kamchatka brown bear); U. a. californicus (California grizzly bear)†; U. a. collaris (East Siberian brown bear); U. a. crowtheri (Atlas bear)†; U. a. dalli (Dall Island brown bear); U. a. gyas (Alaska Peninsula brown bear); U. a. horribilis (Grizzly bear); U. a. isabellinus (Himalayan brown bear); U. a. lasiotus (Ussuri brown bear); U. a. middendorffi (Kodiak bear); U. a. pruinosus (Tibetan blue bear); U. a. sitkensis (ABC Islands bear); U. a. stikeenensis (Stickeen brown bear); U. a. syriacus (Syrian brown bear)	Northern North America and Europe, and northern and central Asia	Size: 100–280 cm (39–110 in) long, plus 6–20 cm (2–8 in) tail 80–550 kg (176–1,213 lb) Habitat: Desert, forest, inland wetlands, grassland, and shrubland Diet: Omnivorous; eats grasses, herbs, roots, berries, nuts, insects, mammals, and fish	LC 110,000
Polar bear	U. maritimus Mulgrave, 1774	Polar North America and Asia	Size: 220–244 cm (87–96 in) long, plus 7–13 cm (3–5 in) tail 408–726 kg (900–1,600 lb) Habitat: Oceanic marine, shrubland, forest, grassland, coastal marine, and intertidal marine Diet: Primarily eats seals, as well as walruses, beluga whales, birds, fish, vegetation and kelp	VU 23,000

== Prehistoric ursids ==
In addition to extant bears, a number of prehistoric species have been discovered and classified as a part of Ursidae. In addition to being placed within the three extant subfamilies, they have been categorized within the extinct subfamilies Agriotheriinae, Hemicyoninae, and Ursavinae, some of which are subdivided into named tribes. There is no generally accepted classification of extinct ursid species. The species listed here are based on data from the Paleobiology Database, unless otherwise cited. Where available, the approximate time period the species was extant is given in millions of years before the present (Mya), also based on data from the Paleobiology Database. All listed species are extinct; where a genus or subfamily within Ursidae comprises only extinct species, it is indicated with a dagger symbol †.

- Subfamily Agriotheriinae†
  - Genus Agriotherium†
    - A. africanum (3.6–2.5 Mya)
    - A. gregoryi
    - A. inexpetans (12–5.3 Mya)
    - A. insigne
    - A. schneideri (14–2.5 Mya)
    - A. sivalensis (5.4–3.6 Mya)
- Subfamily Ailuropodinae
  - Tribe Ailuropodini
    - Genus Agriarctos†
    - Genus Ailurarctos†
      - A. lufengensis
    - Genus Ailuropoda
      - A. baconi (2.6–0.012 Mya)
      - A. fovealis
      - A. microta (2.6–0.78 Mya)
      - A. wulingshanensis (2.6–0.78 Mya)
    - Genus Kretzoiarctos† (12–8.7 Mya)
      - K. beatrix (12–8.7 Mya)
  - Tribe Indarctini†
    - Genus Indarctos†
      - I. anthracitis
      - I. arctoides (9.7–8.7 Mya)
      - I. atticus (8.7–5.3 Mya)
      - I. nevadensis (11–4.9 Mya)
      - I. oregonensis (11–4.9 Mya)
      - I. salmontanus
      - I. vireti
      - I. zdanskyi
    - Genus Miomaci† (12–9.7 Mya)
      - M. pannonicum (12–9.7 Mya)
- Subfamily Hemicyoninae†
  - Tribe Cephalogalini†
    - Genus Adelpharctos† (34–23 Mya)
      - A. ginsburgi (29–23 Mya)
      - A. mirus (34–28 Mya)
    - Genus Cephalogale†
      - C. geoffroyi
      - C. meschethense (29–23 Mya)
      - C. minor (34–28 Mya)
    - Genus Cyonarctos† (29–23 Mya)
      - C. dessei (29–23 Mya)
    - Genus Filholictis†
      - F. filholi
    - Genus Phoberogale†
      - P. depereti
      - P. shareri (31–20 Mya)
  - Tribe Hemicyonini†
    - Genus Dinocyon†
      - D. aurelianensis
      - D. sansaniensis
      - D. thenardi (17–15 Mya)
    - Genus Hemicyon†
      - H. barbouri (14–10 Mya)
      - H. goriachensis
      - H. grivensis
      - H. minor
      - H. sansaniensis (16–12 Mya)
      - H. statzlingii
    - Genus Zaragocyon† (23–20 Mya)
      - Z. daamsi (23–20 Mya)
  - Tribe Phoberocyonini†
    - Genus Phoberocyon†
      - P. aurelianensis (21–7.2 Mya)
      - P. huerzeleri
      - P. johnhenryi (21–15 Mya)
    - Genus Plithocyon† (16–11 Mya)
      - P. armagnacensis (16–11 Mya)
      - P. barstowensis (16–13 Mya)
      - P. ursinus (16–13 Mya)
- Subfamily Tremarctinae
  - Genus Arctodus (short-faced bear)† (2.2–0.012 Mya)
    - A. pristinus (lesser short-faced bear) (2.2–0.3 Mya)
    - A. simus (giant short-faced bear) (1.1–0.012 Mya)
  - Genus Arctotherium†
    - A. angustidens (1.2–0.7 Mya)
    - A. bonariense (0.6–0.037 Mya)
    - A. tarijense (0.5–0.010 Mya)
    - A. vetustum (0.7–0.3 Mya)
    - A. wingei (0.1–0.012 Mya)
  - Genus Plionarctos† (10.3–1.8 Mya)
    - P. edensis (10.3–4.9 Mya)
    - P. harroldorum (4.9–1.8 Mya)
  - Genus Tremarctos (1.8 Mya–present)
    - T. floridanus (Florida spectacled bear) (1.8–0.012 Mya)
- Subfamily Ursavinae†
  - Tribe Ursavini†
    - Genus Ursavus†
      - U. brevirhinus (16–9.7 Mya)
      - U. elmensis (dawn bear) (16–13 Mya)
      - U. pawniensis (24–5.3 Mya)
      - U. primaevus (14–9.7 Mya)
- Subfamily Ursinae
  - Genus Aurorarctos† (15–12.5 Mya)
    - A. tirawa (15–12.5 Mya)
  - Genus Protarctos† (4.9–3.6 Mya)
    - P. abstrusus (4.9–3.6 Mya)
  - Genus Ursus
    - U. arctos priscus (steppe brown bear) (Note: Extinct prehistoric subspecies of an extant species)
    - U. arvernensis (3.2–2.5 Mya)
    - U. deningeri (0.79–0.12 Mya) (Deninger's bear)
    - U. dolinensis (Gran Dolina bear)
    - U. dentrificius (2.6–0.12 Mya)
    - U. etruscus (Etruscan bear)
    - U. eogroenlandicus
    - U. ingressus (Gamssulzen cave bear)
    - U. inopinatus
    - U. jenaensis
    - U. labradorensis
    - U. malayanus (0.13–0.012 Mya)
    - U. maritimus tyrannus (tyrant polar bear)
    - U. minimus (Auvergne bear) (4.2–2.5 Mya)
    - U. optimus
    - U. praemalayanus
    - U. priscus
    - U. rossicus (pleistocene small cave bear)
    - U. spelaeus (cave bear) (2.6–0.012 Mya)
    - U. spitzbergensis
    - U. vitabilis
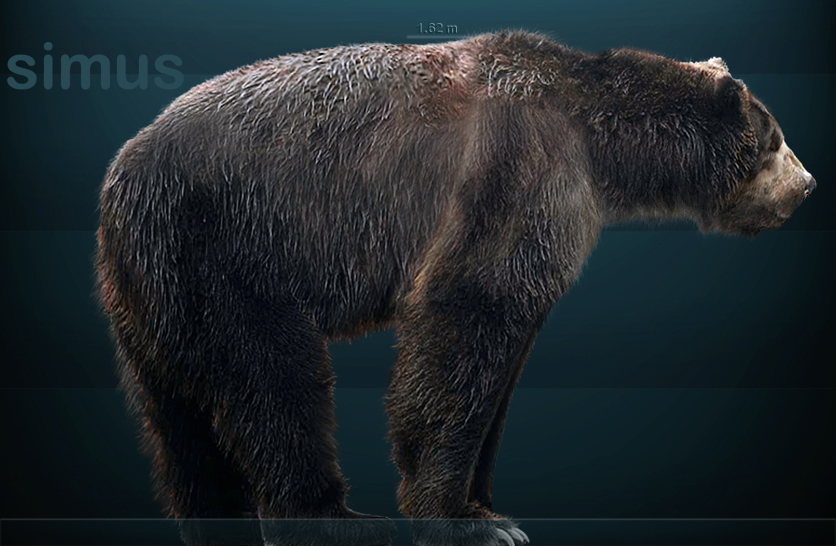
Restoration of Arctodus simus

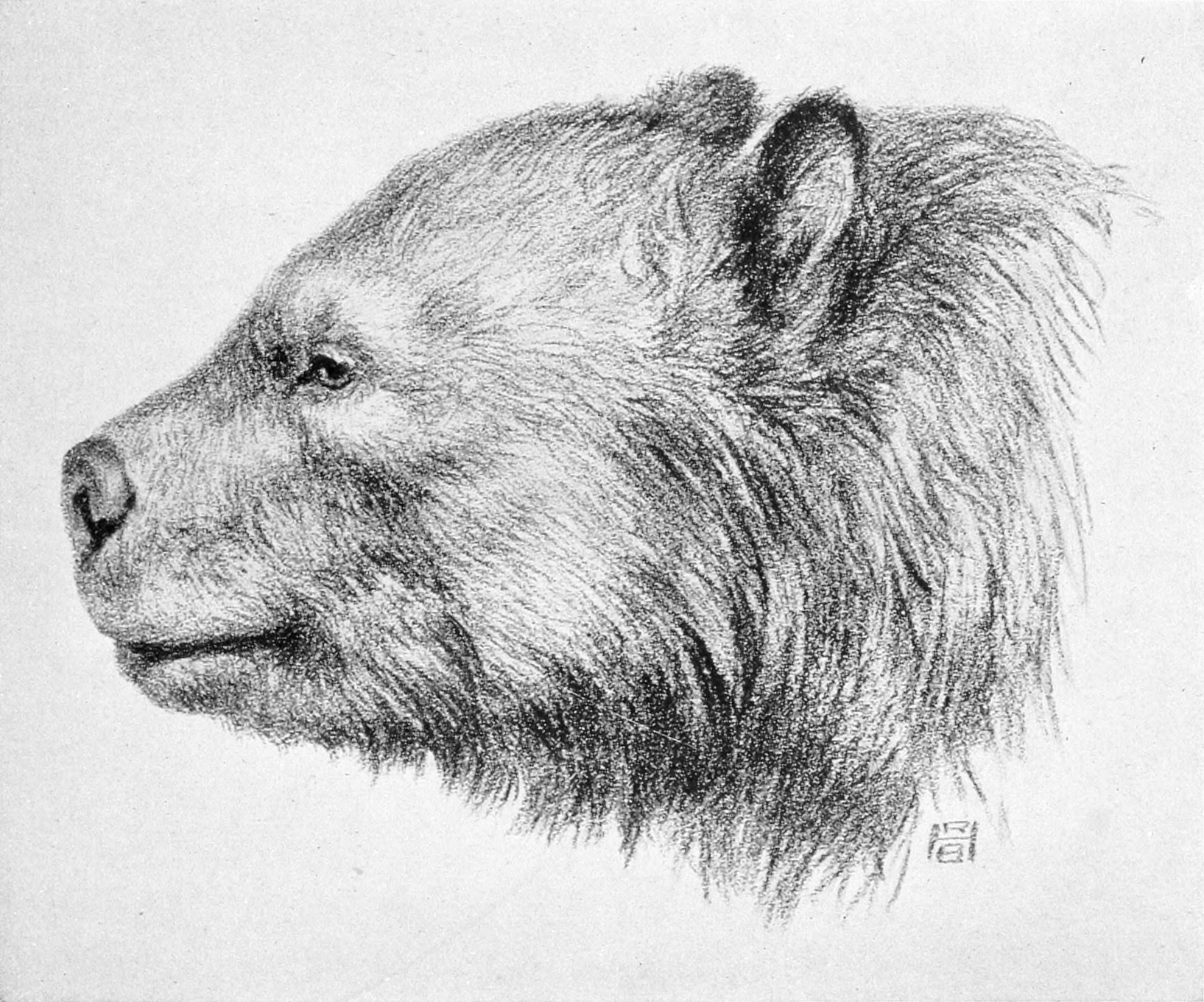
Restoration of Arctotherium bonariense

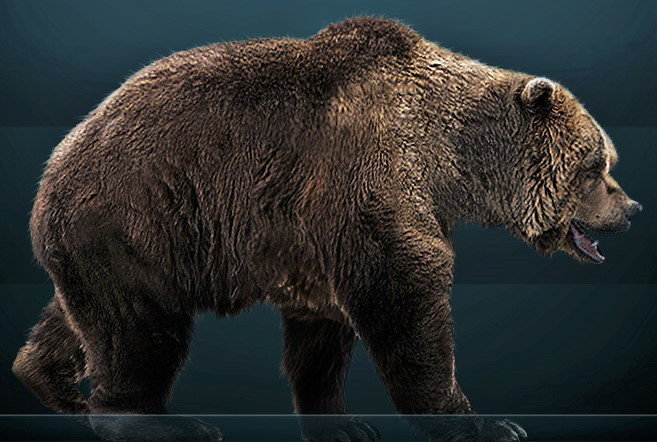
Restoration of Ursus spelaeus (cave bear)

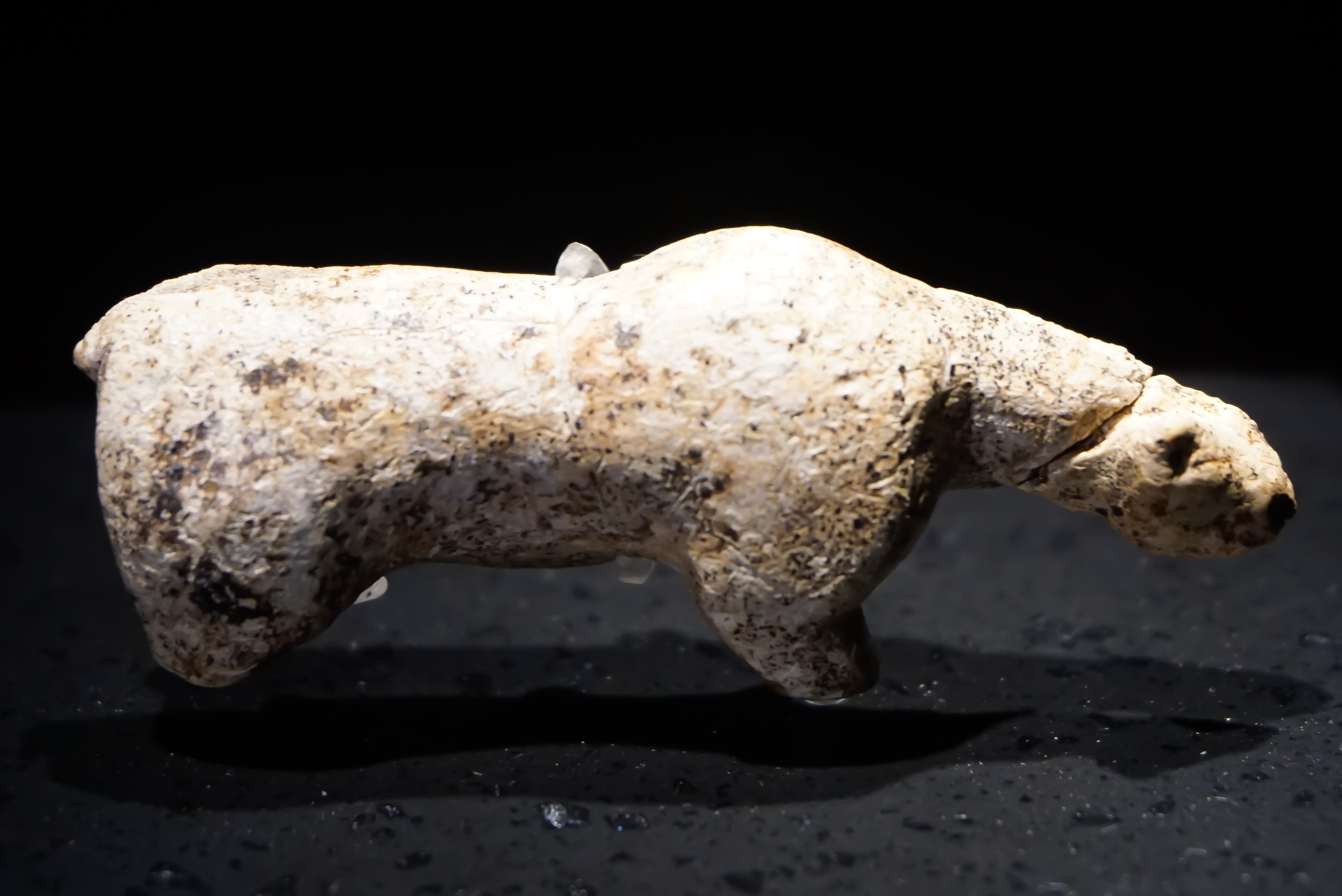
Prehistoric art of Ursus spelaeus (cave bear)

== See also ==
- List of individual bears
- List of fictional bears
- Subspecies of brown bear
