= Aurorarctos =

Aurorarctos Temporal range: Late Barstovian, 15–12.5 Ma

Scientific classification
- Kingdom: Animalia
- Phylum: Chordata
- Class: Mammalia
- Order: Carnivora
- Family: Ursidae
- Subfamily: Ursinae
- Genus: †Aurorarctos; Jiangzuo & Flynn, 2020

Type species
- †Aurorarctos tirawa Jiangzuo & Flynn, 2020

Extinct genus of bears

Aurorarctos is an extinct North American genus of bears. It contains a single species, Aurorarctos tirawa, which lived in the Middle Miocene (15–12.5 Mya). Its fossils were discovered in the Valentine formation and Myers Farm of Nebraska, and represent the earliest known member of the Ursinae, showcasing that basal members of this subfamily were small, but already showed adaptions towards increasing herbivory as well as an arboreal lifestyle The genus name combines the Latin words aurora (dawn) and Greek arctos (bear); the specific epithet references the creator god Tirawa in Pawnee mythology.

== Description ==
Aurorarctos is much smaller than its extant relatives, and its weight has been estimated at 10-20 kg. The relative depth of its robust mandible is similar to that of modern bears, and much greater than in the stem ursid Ballusia elmensis. It lacks both a marginal process and a premasseteric fossa. The cusps of its teeth are blunt and low-crowned. Its upper fourth molar possesses neither a parastyle nor a protocone, while the wide first molar has a strong postero-lingual, cusp-like cingulum. Both the lower and upper second molars are not as elongated as those of other ursines, more closely resembling the condition seen in Ailuropodinae. The second to fourth lower premolars are double-rooted, whereas the first one is only single-rooted, with the last one possessing both a lingual ridge and a non-subdivided posterior ridge. Aurorarctos premolars are not yet reduced, and much larger than in later taxa such as "Ursavus" tedfordi. The only postcranial material known from this genus is an incomplete, relatively small but robust, humerus. The well-developed deltoid tuberosity extends rather far distally along most of the humerus, with its distal border overlapping with the proximally extended ectepicondyle in the shaft, as in modern bears. The epicondyle of its distal condyle is also well-developed, even if it isn't as expanded as in modern ursines. Its moderately thick trochlea facet is also similar to that of modern ursine, and possesses a weak trochlea ridge. There are, however, some notable differences. Modern bears possess a deeper antero-posterior depth of the humeral condyle than Aurorarctos, but lack its large entepicondyle foramen. Its humerus is also generally more slender than that of modern forms. Overall, this genus is more anatomically derived than Early Miocene ursids, but less so than modern forms.

== Classification and evolution ==
The following cladogram showcases the phylogenetic relationships of Aurorarctos tirawa according to Jiangzuo & Flynn, 2020

- Canis lupus
- - Plithocyon teilhardi
  - - Ballusia elmensis
    - Ursidae crown group
      - Ursavus brevirhinus
      - Ailuropodinae
        - Kretzoiarctos beatrix
        - - Miomaci pannonicum
          - "Ursavus" primaevus
          - - Agriarctos depereti
            - - Indarctos atticus
              - - Ailurarctos lufengensis
                - Ailuropoda melanoleuca
      - Ursinae
        - Aurorarctos tirawa
        - - - Arctotheriini
              - Plionarctos edensis
              - - Plionarctos harroldorum
                - - Arctodus simus
                  - - Tremarctos floridanus
                    - Tremarctos ornatus
          - Ursini
            - Ursus boeckhi
            - - - Ursus thibetanus
                - - Ursus ursinus
                  - Ursus malayanus
              - Ursus minimus
              - - Ursus americanus
                - - Ursus etruscus
                  - - Ursus deningeri
                    - Ursus spelaeus
                  - - Ursus arctos
                    - Ursus maritimus
          - "Ursavus" sylvestris
          - "Ursavus ehrenbergi
          - "Ursavus" tedfordi

== Palaeoecology ==
The rather deep mandibular ramus of Aurorarctos indicates an increased loading resistance, with both a geometric morphometric analysis and its dental characters supporting an omnivorous diet, which leaned towards herbivory. Many insectivorous carnivores, such as badgers, mongooses and Ballusia, possess a pair of m1 entoconids, which are, however, fused together in Aurorarctos, decreasing its puncturing ability. The presence of dental caries furthermore supports an omnivorous diet, although it is notable that caries is much more frequent in this basal ursine (21.4%) than in modern bears (2%), suggesting that sugar-rich fruits played a major part in its diet. A geometric morphometric analysis of Aurorarctos distal humerus shows that it falls into a similar morphospace as small, arboreal and fossorial carnivorans, such as the red panda, coatis and badgers, although its epicondyle is notably weaker than in badgers, indicating it was adapted to climbing rather than digging.
