= Hemicyon =

Hemicyon Temporal range: Early Miocene–Late Miocene
- Fossil specimen of H. sp., Shanghai Natural History Museum

Scientific classification
- Kingdom: Animalia
- Phylum: Chordata
- Class: Mammalia
- Order: Carnivora
- Family: Ursidae
- Subfamily: †Hemicyoninae
- Genus: †Hemicyon; Lartet, 1851

Type species
- †Hemicyon sansaniensis Lartet, 1851

Extinct genus of bears

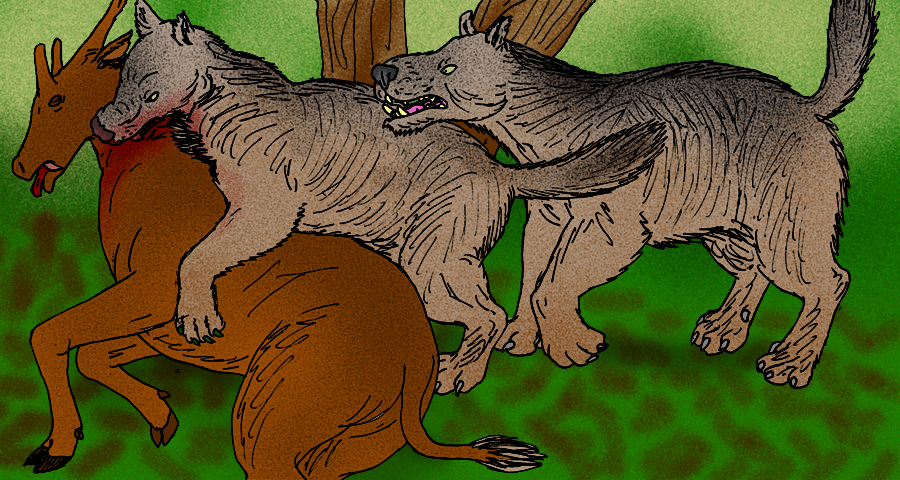
Life restoration of H. sansaniensis hunting a palaeomerycid

Hemicyon, (literally "half dog", from Greek ἡμι- hēmi- (half) + κύων kúōn (dog)), is an extinct genus of hemicyonine bear from the Miocene of Europe, Asia, and possibly North America and Africa. It was most diverse in Europe, and probably had a Eurasian origin. Some or all proposed North American species of Hemicyon may instead belong to Plithocyon or an unnamed genus.

Hemicyon is the best-known genus in Hemicyoninae, a subfamily intermediate in form between modern bears and their caniform ancestors, but most often classified as bears. Hemicyonine bears are sometimes called "dog-bears", but they should not be confused with amphicyonids ("bear-dogs"), which are their own separate family of carnivorans separate from bears and dogs.

== Anatomy ==
Hemicyon was about 1.5 metres (5 ft) long, with carnassial blades on its teeth for cutting meat. Some species of Hemicyon appear to have been hypercarnivorous (entirely meat-eating) and highly predatory, though others were more hypocarnivorous (majority plant-eating). Unlike modern bears, Hemicyon walked on its toes; it hunted by pursuing prey on open ground. In life, the genus would have looked something like a combination of a dog and a bear.

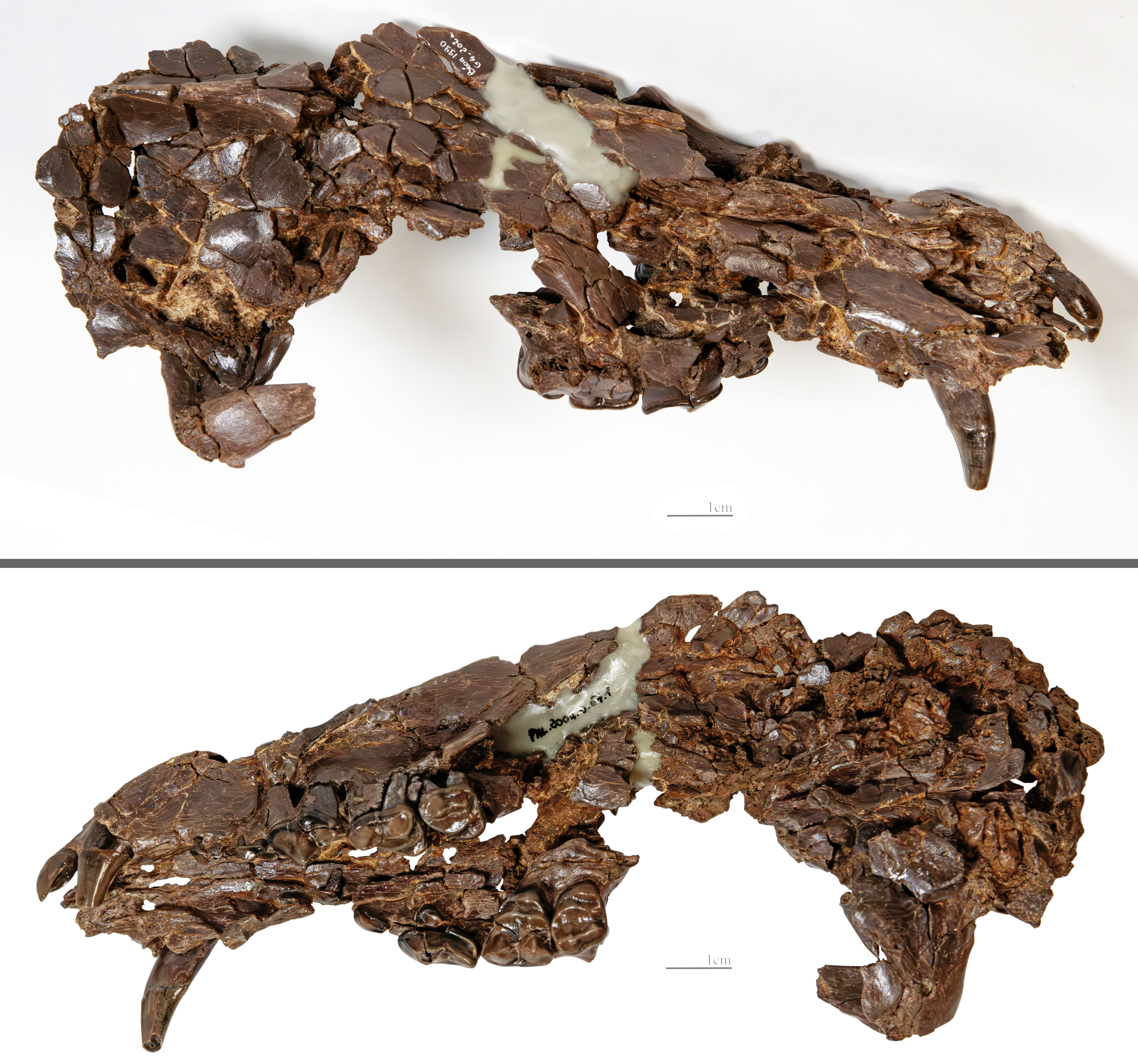
Skull of H. stehlini, Montréal-du-Gers - MHNT

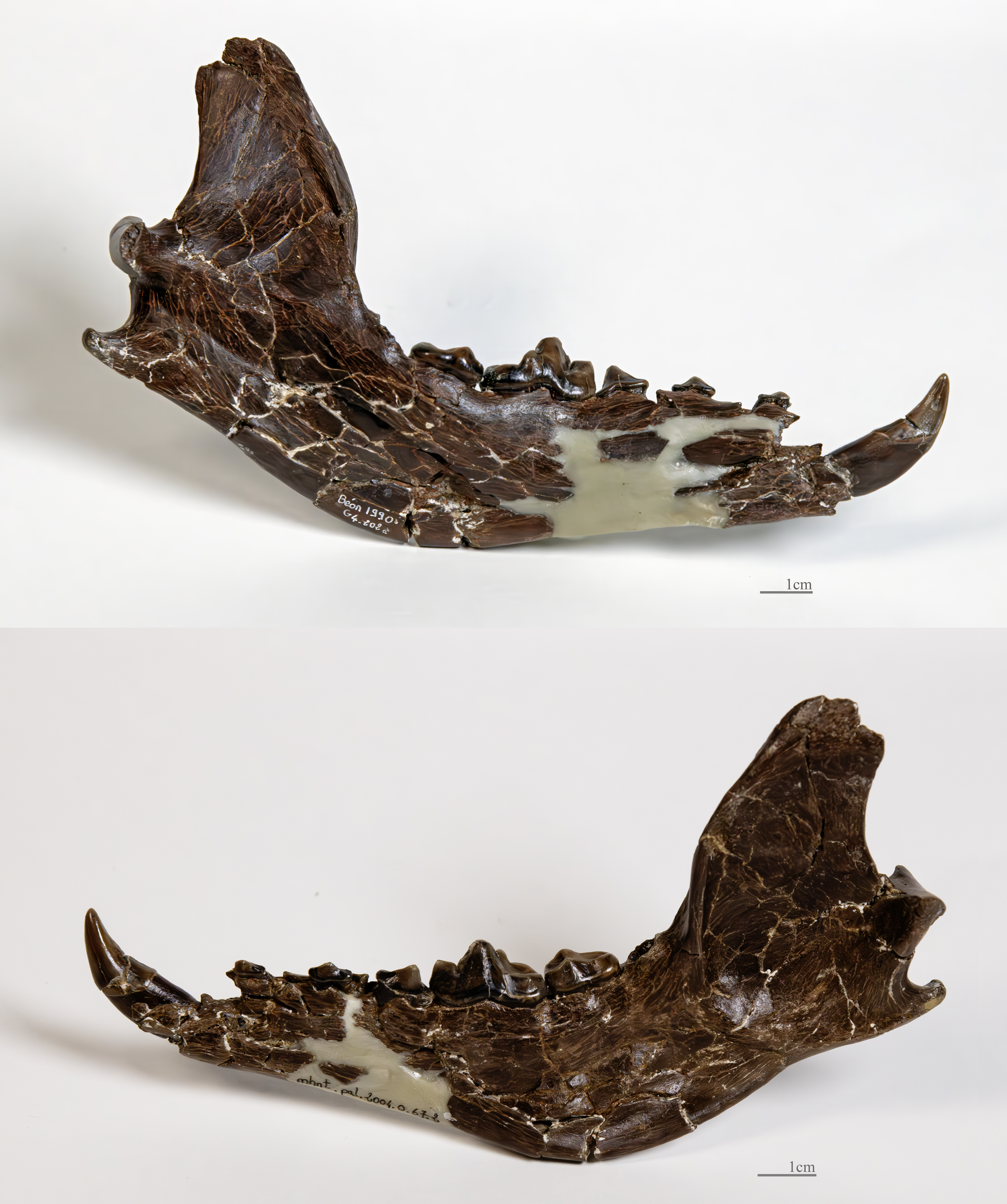
Right hemimandible of H. stehlini, Montréal-du-Gers - MHNT

== Species ==
Species	Author and year	Notes
"H." barbouri	Colbert, 1941	A large species from the Clarendonian of Nebraska. May be a new genus rather than Hemicyon.
H. gargan	Ginsburg & Morales, 1998	A small species from Vaurouleau Quarry (MN3) in Maine-et-Loire, France.
H. goeriachensis	(Toula, 1884)	A medium-sized species from MN6-MN8 deposits in Europe, mostly in Alpine areas (Austria, Germany, France) and other parts of Europe (Spain, Slovakia, Bosnia and Herzegovina). Originally described from Göriach, Austria.
H. mayorali	Astibia et al., 2000	A large species from MN4b deposits near Tarazona, Spain.
H. sansaniensis	Lartet, 1851	The type species of Hemicyon. A larger subspecies (H. sansaniensis sansaniensis) is known from MN6 deposits in France and Spain. Originally described from Sansan, France. A smaller subspecies (H. sansaniensis parvus) is known from MN5 deposits in France and Portugal.
H. stehlini	Hürzeler, 1944	A medium-sized species from MN4b-MN5 deposits in Europe (France, Germany, Spain, Portugal). Originally described from Pontlevoy, France.
H. teilhardi	Colbert, 1939	A medium-sized species from the Tung Gur Formation of Inner Mongolia, China.

A single Hemicyon tooth has been reported from early Miocene Kenya. If legitimate, it would be the oldest known bear fossil in Africa.

Former species:

- H. barstowensis Frick, 1926 - now classified as Plithocyon barstowensis.
- H. californicus Frick, 1926 - probably a junior synonym of Plithocyon barstowensis.
- H. dehmi Ginsburg, 1955 - now classified as Phoberocyon dehmi.
- H. grivensis Frick, 1926 - junior synonym of Hemicyon goeriachensis.
- H. hareni Ginsburg, 1989 - now classified as Ballusia hareni.
- H. minor Dépéret, 1887 - indeterminate, possibly referable to Cephalogale.
- H. statzlingii Frick, 1926 - junior synonym of Hemicyon goeriachensis.
- H. ursinus (Cope, 1875) - A large and well-preserved species from the Tesuque Formation Pojoaque Member (Barstovian) of New Mexico. Often considered a species of Plithocyon.
- H. vincenti Mein, 1958 - a junior synonym of Hemicyon stehlini.
- H. youngi Xiang et al., 1986 - Part of the Shanwang fauna of Shandong, China. Now classified as Phoberocyon youngi.
