= Dinocyon =

Dinocyon Temporal range: Miocene

Scientific classification
- Kingdom: Animalia
- Phylum: Chordata
- Class: Mammalia
- Order: Carnivora
- Family: Ursidae
- Subfamily: †Hemicyoninae
- Genus: †Dinocyon; Jourdan, 1861

Type species
- †Dinocyon thenardi Jourdan, 1861

Extinct genus of bears

Dinocyon is an extinct genus of hemicyonine bear from the Middle Miocene of Europe (Astaracian, MN7 - MN9, around 12.75 - 9.7 million years ago). The type species Dinocyon thenardi is an uncommon but enormous hemicyonine. Ginsburg & Morales (1998) suggested that Dinocyon was a direct descendant of Hemicyon sansaniensis.

Frick (1926) named two more species, D. sansaniensis and D. aurelianensis. Ginsburg (1955) considered D. sansaniensis to be a junior synonym of Hemicyon sansaniensis (from the same site, hence the identical species name). He placed D. aurelianensis into a new genus, Phoberocyon.

== Fossil distribution ==
From Ginsburg & Morales (1998)

- La Grive-Saint-Alban, France
- Draßburg, Austria
- Poysbrunn site, Austria
- Gau-Weinheim, Germany
- Wissberg, Germany
