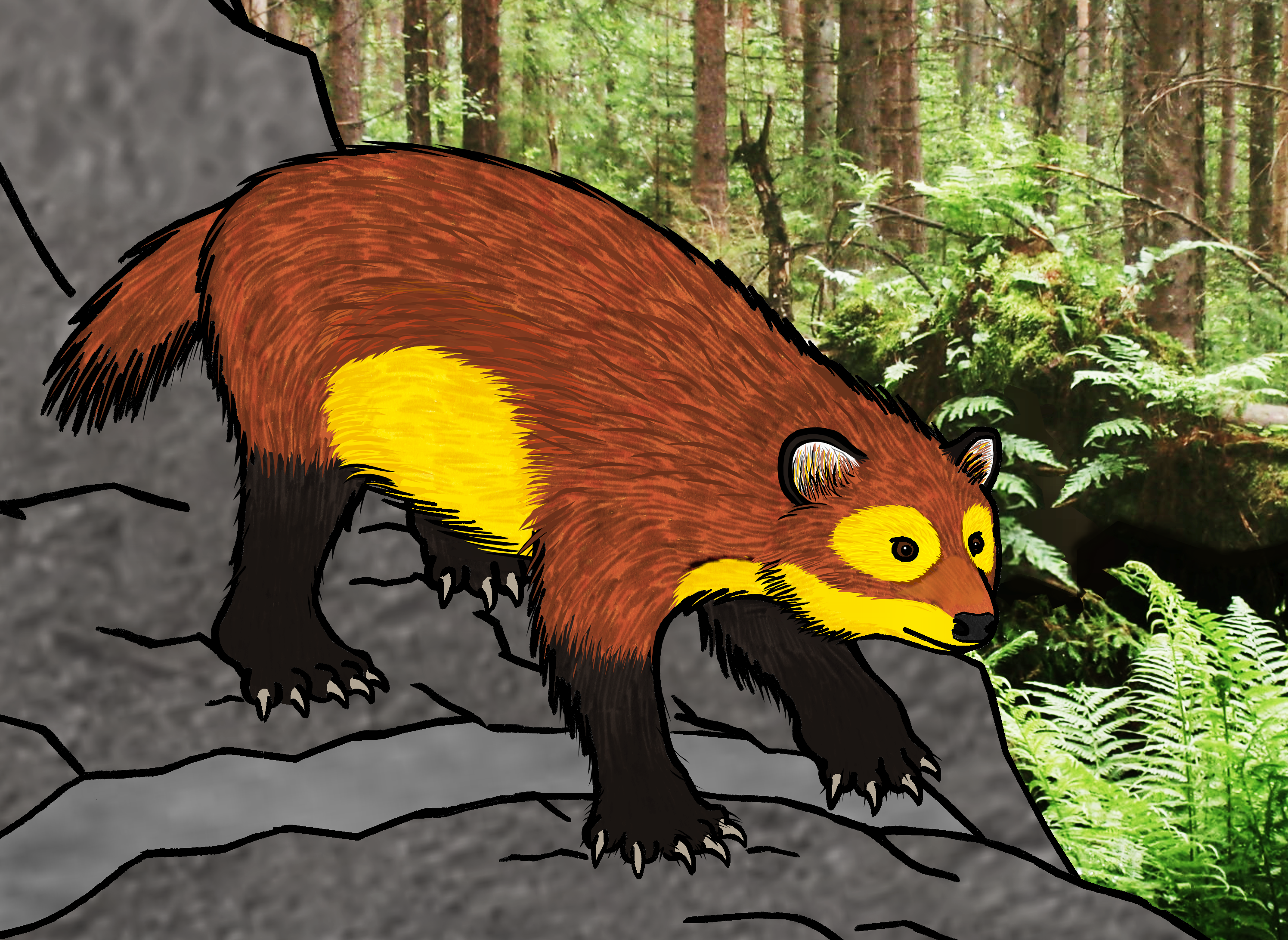
- Life restoration of Ballusia orientalis

Scientific classification
- Domain: Eukaryota
- Kingdom: Animalia
- Phylum: Chordata
- Class: Mammalia
- Order: Carnivora
- Family: Ursidae
- Subfamily: †Ursavinae; Hendey, 1980
- Tribe: †Ursavini; Hendey, 1980

Genera
- †Ballusia; †Ursavus

= Ursavini =

Ursavini Temporal range: 23–2.5 Ma

Extinct tribe of bears

Ursavini is an extinct tribe of mammals of the family Ursidae (bears) endemic to North America, Europe, Africa, and Asia during the Miocene through the Pliocene, living from about 23—2.5 Mya, existing for roughly 20.5 million years.

Ursavini was assigned to the Ursinae by Hunt (1998) and Jin et al. (2007) and includes the genera Agriotherium and Ursavus. However in a 2014 paper published on the origins of bears, found Agriotherium to be closer to extant bears and some species of Ursavus might warrant to be in a separate but related genus Ballusia.
