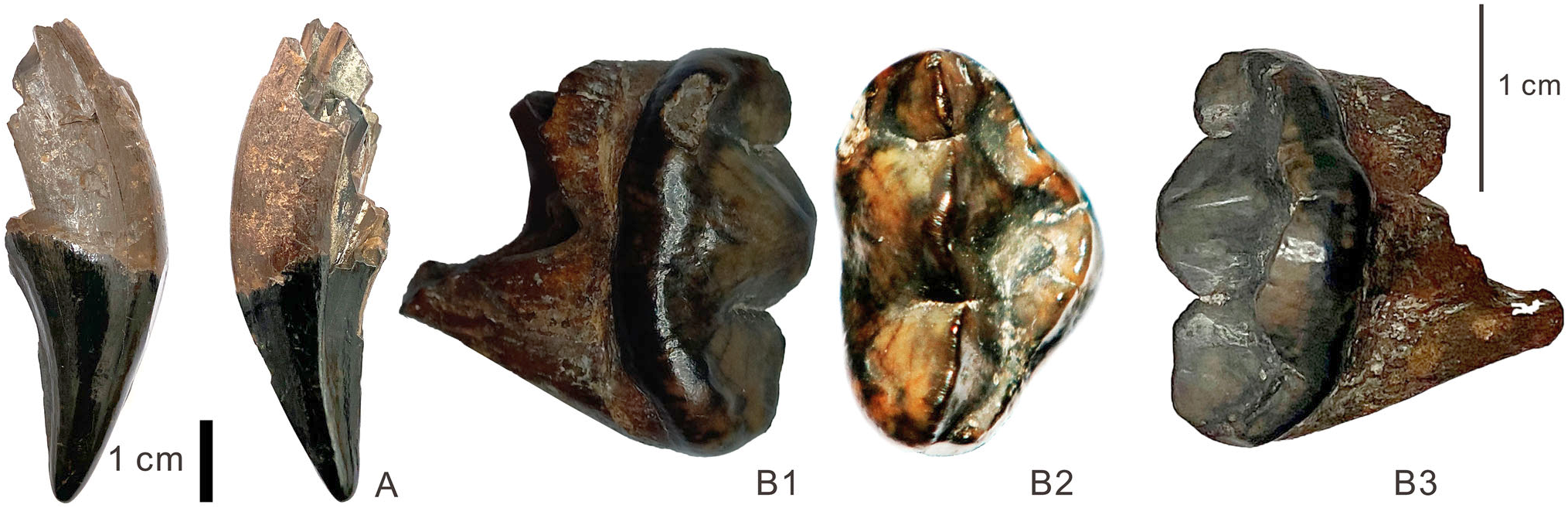

Conservation status
- Extinct

Scientific classification
- Kingdom: Animalia
- Phylum: Chordata
- Class: Mammalia
- Order: Carnivora
- Suborder: Caniformia
- Family: Ursidae
- Subfamily: Ailuropodinae
- Tribe: Ailuropodini
- Genus: †Agriarctos
- Species: †A. nikolovi

Binomial name
- †Agriarctos nikolovi Jiangzuo & Spassov, 2022

= Agriarctos nikolovi =

Extinct genus of bears

Agriarctos nikolovi is an extinct species of panda from the Late Miocene of Bulgaria, some 6 million years ago. The specific epithet of the scientific name commemorates Dr. Ivan Nikolov, paleontologist in the Bulgarian National Museum of Natural History, for having preserved two teeth later used as the holotypes identifying the species in the museum's collections, and "for his contributions to the study of the fossil mammal fauna of Bulgaria".
