= Zaragocyon =

Zaragocyon Temporal range: Early Miocene

Scientific classification
- Kingdom: Animalia
- Phylum: Chordata
- Class: Mammalia
- Order: Carnivora
- Family: Ursidae
- Genus: †Zaragocyon; Ginsburg & Morales, 1995
- Species: †Z. daamsi

Binomial name
- †Zaragocyon daamsi Ginsburg & Morales, 1995

Extinct genus of bears

Zaragocyon is an extinct monospecific genus of hemicyonine bear from the Early Miocene of Spain.
