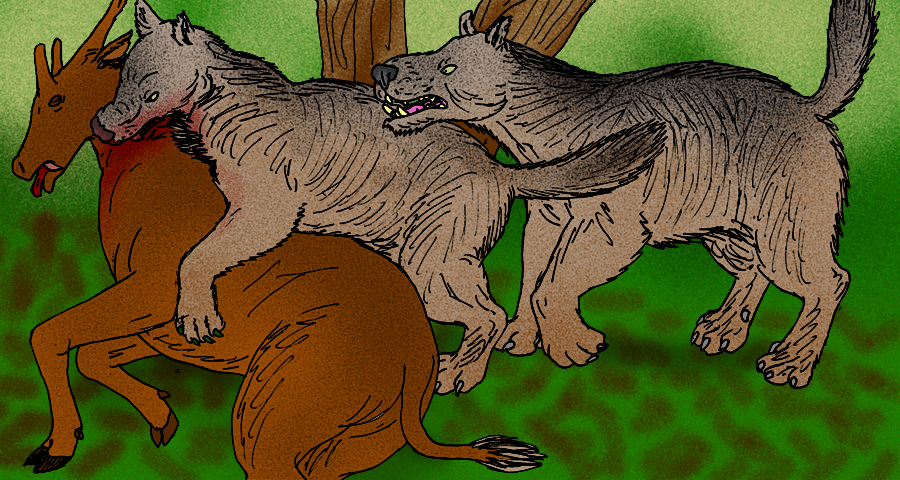
- Hemicyon sansaniensis

Scientific classification
- Kingdom: Animalia
- Phylum: Chordata
- Class: Mammalia
- Order: Carnivora
- Family: Ursidae
- Subfamily: †Hemicyoninae; Frick, 1926

Tribes and genera
- Tribe †Cephalogalini de Bonis, 2013; †Adelpharctos; †Cyonarctos; †Phoberogale; †Filholictis; †Cephalogale; Tribe †Phoberocyonini Ginsburg & Morales, 1995; †Plithocyon; †Phoberocyon; Tribe †Hemicyonini Frick, 1926; †Zaragocyon; †Dinocyon; †Hemicyon

= Hemicyoninae =

Hemicyoninae Temporal range: Early Oligocene to Late Miocene 33.9–5.3 Ma

Extinct subfamily of bears

Hemicyoninae is an extinct subfamily of Ursidae, often called dog bears (literally "half dog" (Greek: ἡμικυων hemi-kyōn)). They lived in Europe, North America, Africa and Asia, lasting through the Oligocene and Miocene epochs (about 33.9–5.3 Ma). They are sometimes classified as a separate family.

Unlike modern bears, but like canids (dogs and kin), hemicyonines had a digitigrade stance with only their toes resting on the ground. Some hemicyonines were small and fox-like, but others could reach the size of a wolf, making them the first bears to attain a large size. The skull is robust, with a short, broad snout. The fourth upper premolar (P4) retains a well-developed carnassial form for shearing meat. Like modern bears, the first upper molar (M1) is roughly quadrate (four-cusped), but the second upper molar (M2) is not as long from front-to-back.

Though more carnivorous than modern bears, most hemicyonines still likely consumed plants as a minor component of their diet. The tribe Phoberocyonini had particularly large carnassials, so they may have been hypercarnivorous (exclusively meat-eating).

== Systematics ==
The hemicyonines consists of three tribes: the Cephalogalini, Phoberocyonini, and Hemicyonini. In the past, the hemicyonines were evaluated into family level (Hemicyonidae). However, the vast majority of papers and researchers that cover the evolution of bears often classified them as an extinct subfamily of ursids or stem-bears.

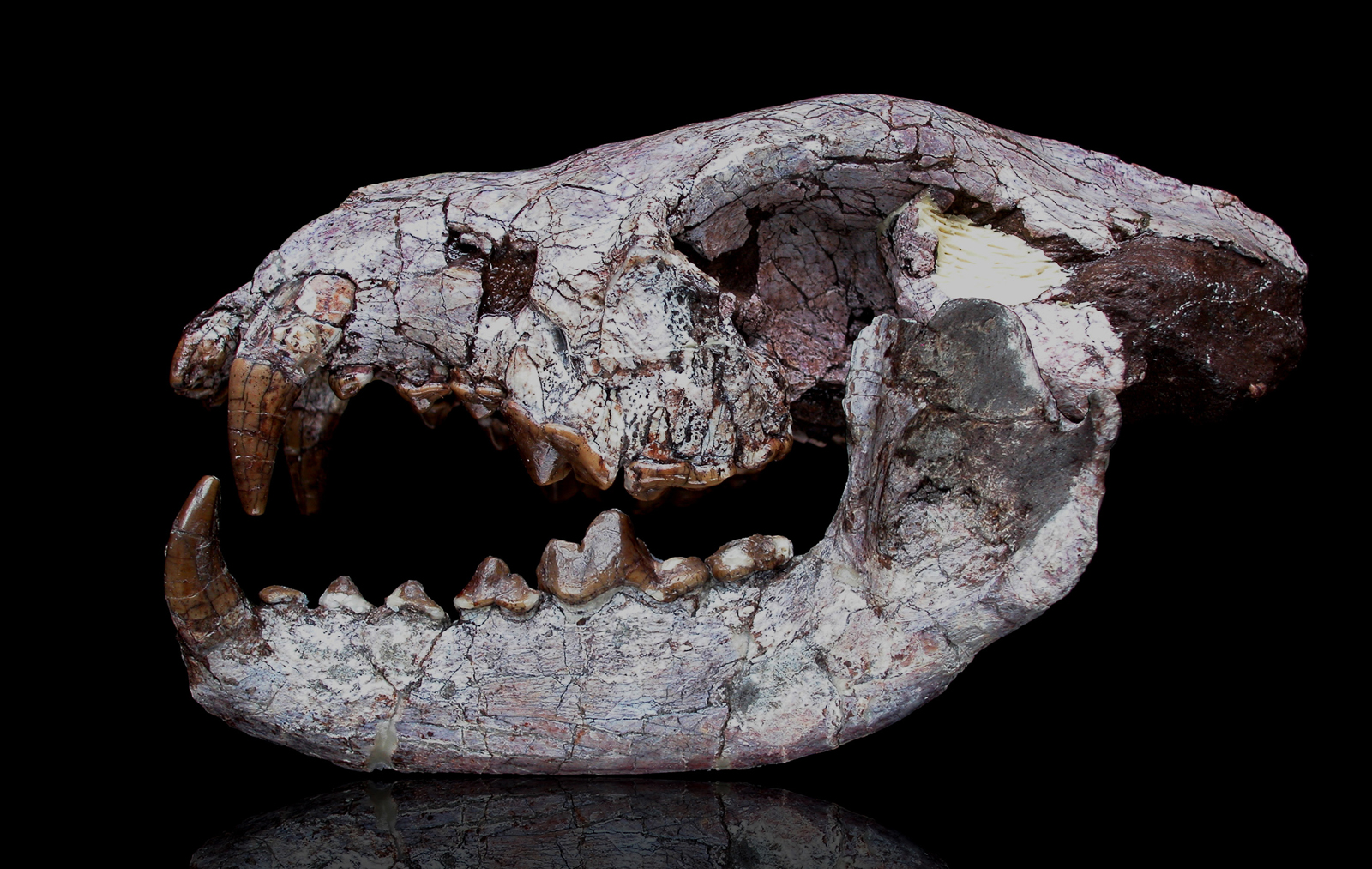
Skull of Phoberogale shareri, a large cephalogalin from early Miocene California.

Cephalogalini were the first hemicyonines to appear in the fossil record, in the Oligocene. They generally have a less quadrate M1, due to its smaller metaconule cusp. Their lower jaw teeth are distinctive, with a reduced metaconid on the first molar (m1) and a reduced protoconid on the second molar (m2).

The two later tribes are exclusively Miocene and reach a greater body size on average, though in other regards they diverge strongly. The Phoberocyonini were hypercarnivores with a larger and sharper P4 than any other type of bear. The Hemicyonini instead trend towards enlarged molars at the expense of their premolars, and like cephalogalins their m1 metaconid is reduced.

The genus Agriotherium was at one point classified as a hemicyonine, but recent work has instead shown that it is an ailuropodine crown-ursid, distantly related to pandas.

- Subfamily †Hemicyoninae Frick, 1926
  - Tribe †Cephalogalini de Bonis, 2013
    - †Adelpharctos de Bonis, 1971
      - †Adelpharctos ginsburgi de Bonis, 2011
      - †Adelpharctos mirus de Bonis, 1971
    - †Cyonarctos de Bonis, 2013
      - †Cyonarctos dessei de Bonis, 2013
    - †Phoberogale Ginsburg & Morales, 1995
      - †Phoberogale minor (Filhol, 1877)
      - †Phoberogale bonali (Helbing, 1928)
      - †Phoberogale depereti (Viret, 1929)
      - †Phoberogale gracile (Pomel, 1847)
    - †Filholictis de Bonis, 2013
      - †Filholictis filholi (Munier-Chalmas, 1877)
    - †Cephalogale Jourdan, 1862
      - †Cephalogale shareri Wang, et al., 2009
      - †Cephalogale gergoviensis Viret, 1929
      - †Cephalogale ginesticus Kuss, 1962
      - †Cephalogale geoffroyi Jourdan, 1862
  - Tribe †Phoberocyonini Ginsburg & Morales, 1995
    - †Plithocyon Ginsburg, 1955
      - †Plithocyon armagnacensis Ginsburg, 1955
      - †Plithocyon barstowensis (Frick, 1926)
      - †Plithocyon bruneti Ginsburg, 1980
      - †Plithocyon ursinus (Cope, 1875)
    - †Phoberocyon Ginsburg, 1955
      - †Phoberocyon aurelianensis (Mayet, 1908)
      - †Phoberocyon dehmi Ginsburg, 1955
      - †Phoberocyon hispanicus Ginsburg & Morales, 1998
      - †Phoberocyon huerzeleri Ginsburg, 1955
      - †Phoberocyon johnhenryi (White, 1947)
      - †Phoberocyon youngi Xiang et al., 1986
  - Tribe †Hemicyonini Frick, 1926
    - †Zaragocyon Ginsburg & Morales, 1995
      - †Zaragocyon daamsi Ginsburg & Morales, 1995
    - †Dinocyon Jourdan, 1861
      - †Dinocyon sansaniensis Frick, 1926
      - †Dinocyon thenardi Jourdan, 1861
    - †Hemicyon Lartet, 1851
      - †"Hemicyon" barbouri Colbert, 1941
      - †Hemicyon gargan Ginsburg & Morales, 1998
      - †Hemicyon goeriachensis (Toula, 1884)
      - †Hemicyon mayorali Astibia et al., 2000
      - †Hemicyon sansaniensis Lartet, 1851
      - †Hemicyon stehlini Hürzeler, 1944
      - †Hemicyon teilhardi Colbert, 1939

An unnamed hemicyonid has been reported from the Gaillard Cut Local Fauna in Panama.
