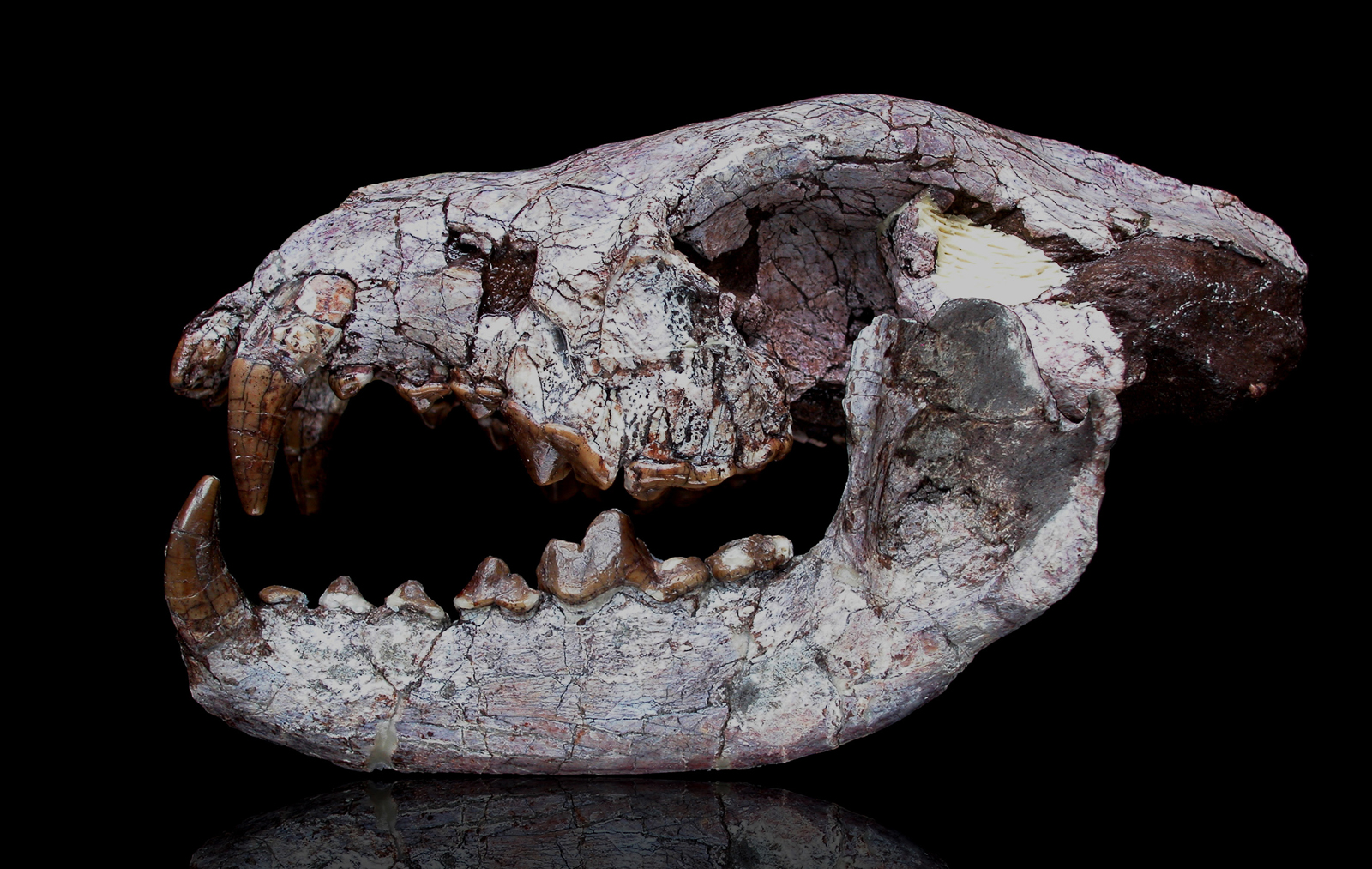
- Skull and lower jaw of Phoberogale shareri, holotype, OCPC 21794 and 21795.

Scientific classification
- Kingdom: Animalia
- Phylum: Chordata
- Class: Mammalia
- Infraclass: Placentalia
- Order: Carnivora
- Family: Ursidae
- Subfamily: †Hemicyoninae
- Genus: †Phoberogale; Ginsberg & Morales, 1995

Type species
- Phoberogale bugtiensis (Cooper, 1923)

= Phoberogale =

Phoberogale Temporal range: Oligocene–Miocene

Extinct genus of bears

Phoberogale is an extinct genus of hemicyonine bear, which lived during the Early Miocene, found in France, California, and Pakistan, from 22 to 20 million years ago.
