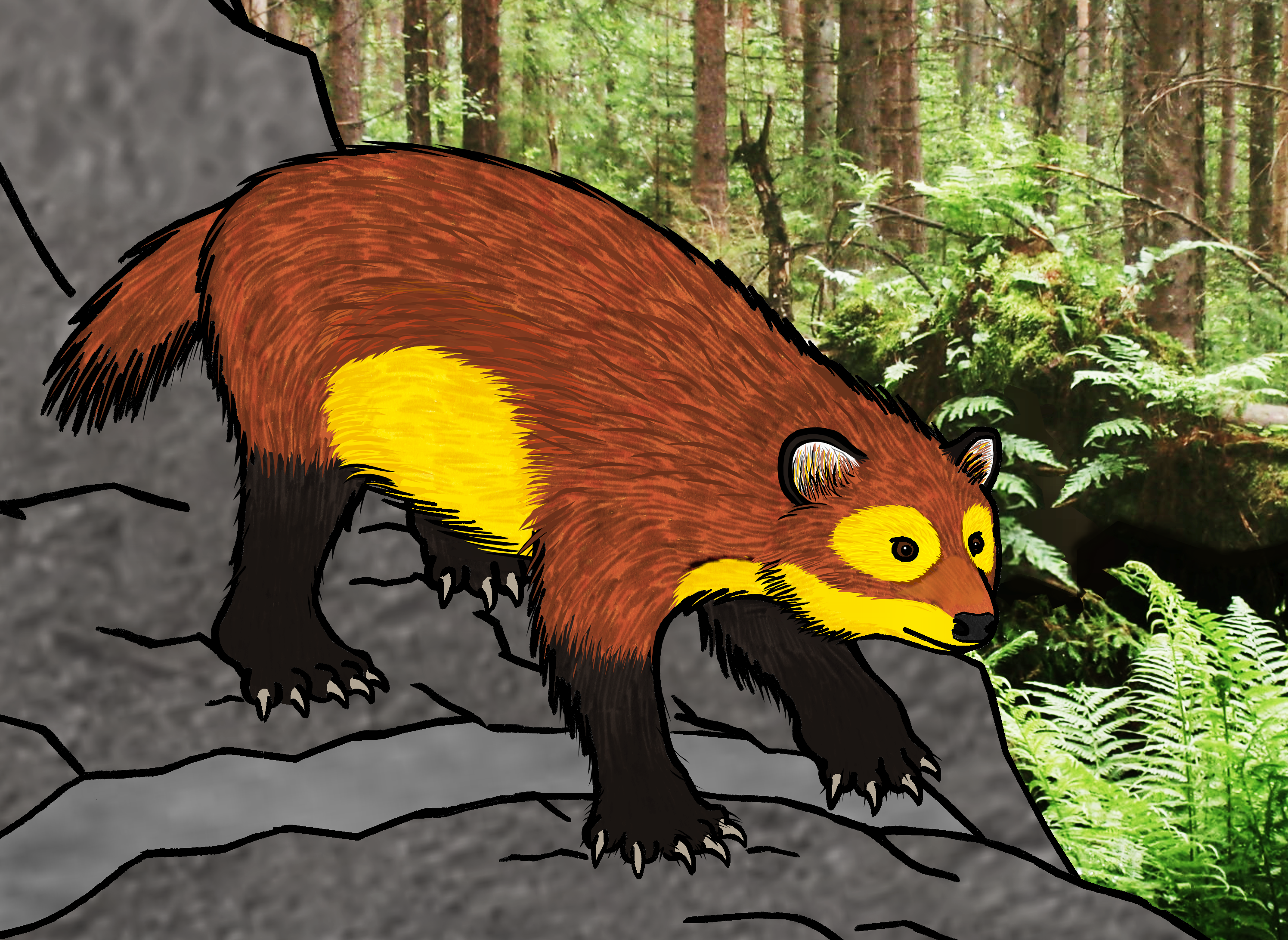
- Life restoration of B. orientalis

Scientific classification
- Kingdom: Animalia
- Phylum: Chordata
- Class: Mammalia
- Order: Carnivora
- Family: Ursidae
- Genus: †Ballusia; Ginsburg & Morales, 1998

Type species
- †Ballusia elmensis

Species
- †B. elmensis (Stehlin, 1917); †B. orientalis (Qui et.al., 1985); †B. hareni (Ginsburg, 1989); †B. zhegalloi (Sotnikova, 2021)

= Ballusia =

Ballusia Temporal range: 16 Ma

Extinct genus of bears

Ballusia was a genus of small bear from the Early Miocene epoch, about 20.5-18 million years ago. Fossil remains attributed to the genus have been uncovered in Europe (Poland) and Asia (Russia, Mongolia, China). The genus Ballusia was established in 1998 on the basis of different fossils originally classified as various species of the genera Ursavus and Hemicyon, with B. elmensis as the type species. The exact relationship of Ballusia to "true" bears (subfamily Ursinae, which include modern bears) are not yet fully understood: many palaeontologists have classified it as a primitive member of Ursinae, but its known skeletal elements have some features in common with the extinct bear subfamily Hemicyoninae. Because of this, some researchers refer Ballusia as "Ursidae incertae sedis". Ginsburg and Morales regarded B. elmenensis as ancestral to Ursavus, as did Marciszak and Lipecki, even though the temporal range of the two genera seems to have overlapped.

== Description ==
Ballusia were smaller than most living bear species: fossil remains of the species B. orientalis indicate an animal about the size of a domestic cat with body proportions similar to a wolverine, while B. elmenensis were the size of a Eurasian lynx. It possessed slender legs and also had relatively longer tail than modern bears.
