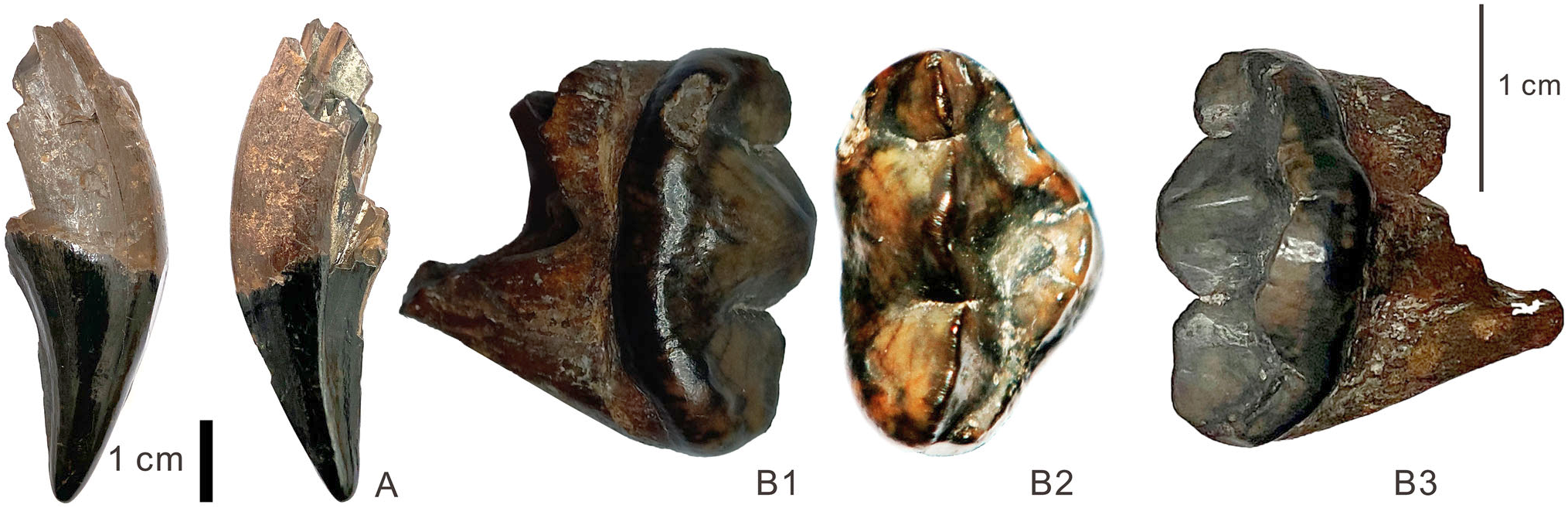
- Teeth of?Ag. nikolovi: A, NMNHS FM3546-b, upper canine in labial and lingual views; B, NMNHS FM3546-a, P4 in buccal, occlusal, and lingual views.

Scientific classification
- Kingdom: Animalia
- Phylum: Chordata
- Class: Mammalia
- Order: Carnivora
- Family: Ursidae
- Tribe: Ailuropodini
- Genus: †Agriarctos; Kretzoi, 1942

Type species
- †A. gaali Kretzoi, 1942

Species
- †A. depereti (Schlosser, 1902); †A. gaali Kretzoi, 1942; †A. nikolovi Jiangzuo & Spassov, 2022; †A. vighi Kretzoi, 1942

= Agriarctos =

Agriarctos Temporal range: Middle to Late Miocene

Extinct genus of bears

Agriarctos is an extinct genus of panda from the Middle to Late Miocene, approximately 8-18 million years ago. This genus and its type species, A. gaali, was established based on fossils from Hatvan, Hungary, while A. vighi was based on fossils from Rózsaszentmárton. Miklós Kretzoi proposed that Agriarctos was closely related to Agriotherium. The previously published Ursavus depereti was assigned to Agriarctos by Kretzoi, but now proved to be polyphyletic.

Agriarctos beatrix was published in 2011 as a new species of Agriarctos. It was later erected as a new genus Kretzoiarctos, which was named after Kretzoi.
