= Miomaci =

Miomaci Temporal range: 10 Ma

Scientific classification
- Kingdom: Animalia
- Phylum: Chordata
- Class: Mammalia
- Infraclass: Placentalia
- Order: Carnivora
- Family: Ursidae
- Subfamily: Ailuropodinae
- Genus: †Miomaci de Bonis, Abella, Merceron and Begun 2017

Species
- †M. pannonicum

Extinct genus of bears

Miomaci (Latinized Greek: mio, abbreviation of "Miocene" + Hungarian: maci "little bear") is a genus of herbivorous ailuropodine bear from the late Miocene of Hungary. It is known only from teeth and jaws, but these indicate it was significantly smaller than its close relative Indarctos, which could reach 265.74 kilograms or 585.9 pounds.

== Discovery and Naming ==
Miomaci is known from dental remains of one individual including a left maxilla with P3-M2, left upper canine, 2 left incisors, right M1, right M2, right p1, fragment of right mandible with p3-m1, left hemimandible with alveoli with p1-p4, m1 (separated), m2-m3. The material is stored in the Geological Museum of the Geological and Geophysical Institute of Hungary. The specimens are known from the Edelény Formation near the town of Rudabánya, Hungary and date to the Vallesian age of the late Miocene.

The generic name is derived from 'Miocene' and 'Maci, the Hungarian word for 'little bear' or 'teddy bear'. The specific name, pannonicum, is Latin for 'comes from Pannonia', the Roman province in which Rudabánya is located.
