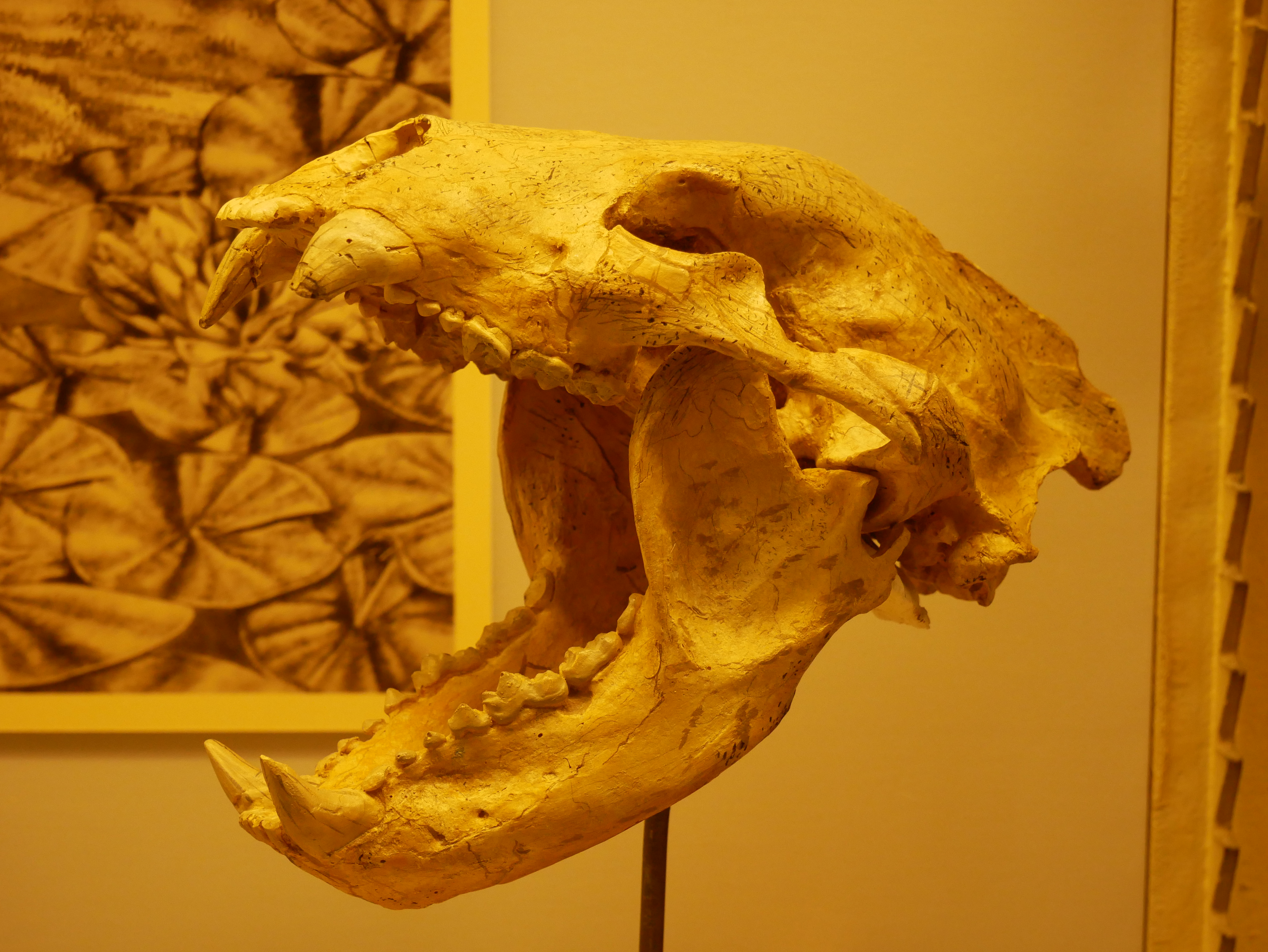
- Cast skull of Ursavus tedfordi at the Gallery of Paleontology and Comparative Anatomy, Paris.

Scientific classification
- Kingdom: Animalia
- Phylum: Chordata
- Class: Mammalia
- Order: Carnivora
- Family: Ursidae
- Tribe: †Ursavini
- Genus: †Ursavus; Schlosser, 1899

Type species
- †Ursavus brevirhinus Hofmann, 1887

Species
- †Ursavus brevirhinus (Hofmann, 1887); †Ursavus primaevus (Gaillard, 1899); †Ursavus intermedius (Koenigswald, 1925); †Ursavus pawniensis (Frick, 1926); †Ursavus ehrenbergi (Brunner, 1942); †Ursavus sylvestris (Qiu & Qi, 1990); †Ursavus isorei (Ginsburg & Morales, 1998); †Ursavus tedfordi (Zhanxiang et al., 2014)

= Ursavus =

Ursavus Temporal range: 23–5.3 Ma

Extinct genus of bears

Ursavus is an extinct genus of bear that existed in North America, Europe, and Asia during the Miocene period, about 23–5.3 million years ago (Mya), existing for roughly 17.7 million years. The genus apparently dispersed from Asia into North America about 20 Mya, becoming the earliest member of the subfamily Ursinae in the New World. Qiu points out that if a questionable 29 million-year-old specimen of Ursavus reported in North America is validated, Ursavus may have evolved in North America and dispersed westward into Asia. The higher number of fossils in Europe grading toward eastern Asia make the westward dispersal unlikely.

U. elmensis, also known as the "dawn bear" is generally taken to be the earliest undisputed bear species.

== Description ==
Life restoration of Ursavus sp. of the Haystack Assemblage

In life, the various species would have been between cat-sized for the smaller species and wolf-sized for the larger members of the genus and were mainly omnivores or hypocarnivores.

Most other species are known from teeth and skull fragments. A complete skull has been found in the Gansu region of China of a new species from the late Miocene, dubbed U. tedfordi. It was about the size of a wolf and – except for the giant panda and the spectacled bear – is believed to be the nearest to the common ancestor of modern bears.

Currently, the only member known from a complete skeleton is U. orientalis, found in the Shanwang diatomite of Early Miocene China. However, Qiu et.al. (2014) have suggested reassignment of U. orientalis to the genus Ballusia, in which case it would no longer be considered part of Ursavus.

== Fossil distribution ==
A partial list of find sites and specimen ages:

- Pawnee Buttes Site, Weld County, Colorado (U. pawniensis) ~23.03–5.3 Ma.
- Shanwang diatomite, Shanwang, China (U. orientalis) ~17-16 Ma. May belong to the genus Ballusia
- Pasalar site, Bursa, Turkey (U. primaevus) ~16–13.7 Ma.
- Baigneaux-en-Beauc, Alsac, France (U. brevirhinus) ~16.9–16.0 Ma.
- Hambach mine horizon 6C, Germany (U. elmensis) ~16.9–13.7 Ma.
- Yost Farm Site, Saskatchewan, Canada (U. primaevus) ~16.3–13.6 Ma.
- Myers Farm Site, Valentine Formation, Webster County, Nebraska (U. brevirhinus) ~16.3–13.6 Ma.
- Lufeng site, Yunnan, China (U. depereti) ~7-6 Ma.
- Linxia Basin Gansu, China (U. tedfordi) ~9-7 Ma.
