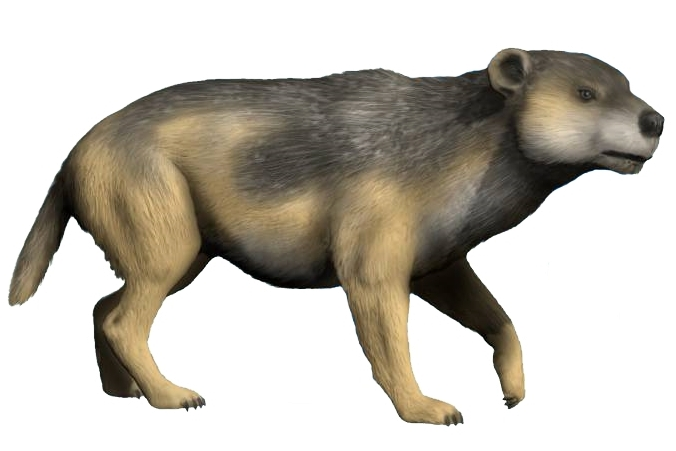
- Life reconstruction of Cephalogale shareri

Scientific classification
- Domain: Eukaryota
- Kingdom: Animalia
- Phylum: Chordata
- Class: Mammalia
- Order: Carnivora
- Family: Ursidae
- Subfamily: †Hemicyoninae
- Genus: †Cephalogale; Jourdan, 1862

Type species
- †Cephalogale geoffroyi Jourdan, 1862

Species
- †C. shareri (Wang, et al., 2009) †C. gergoviensis (Viret, 1929) †C. ginesticus (Kuss, 1962) †C. geoffroyi (Jourdan, 1862)

= Cephalogale =

Cephalogale Temporal range: 28.4–20 Ma early Oligocene to Miocene

Extinct genus of bears

Cephalogale is an extinct genus of hemicyonine bear which lived in the Oligocene and Early Miocene epochs in North America and Europe. It lived from around 28.4—20.0 Mya. Before it was reconsidered to be close to the ancestry of hemicyonines, Cephalogale was once considered to be an ancestor of all bears.

== Fossil distribution ==
- Dětaň, Czech Republic about 33.9—28.4 Mya
- Cetina de Aragon, Spain about 22.4—20 Mya
- Standing Rock Quarry, Zia Sand Formation, Sandoval County, New Mexico about 24.8—20.6 Mya
- Agate Springs Quarries, Sioux County, Nebraska about 23–5.3 Mya
- Hemingford Quarry 12D, Runningwater Formation, Box Butte County, Nebraska about 20.6—16.3 Mya

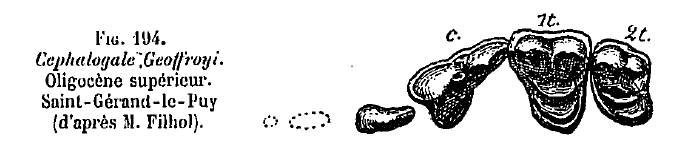
Cephalogale dentition, Saint-Gérand-le-Puy (Allier, Auvergne, France)
