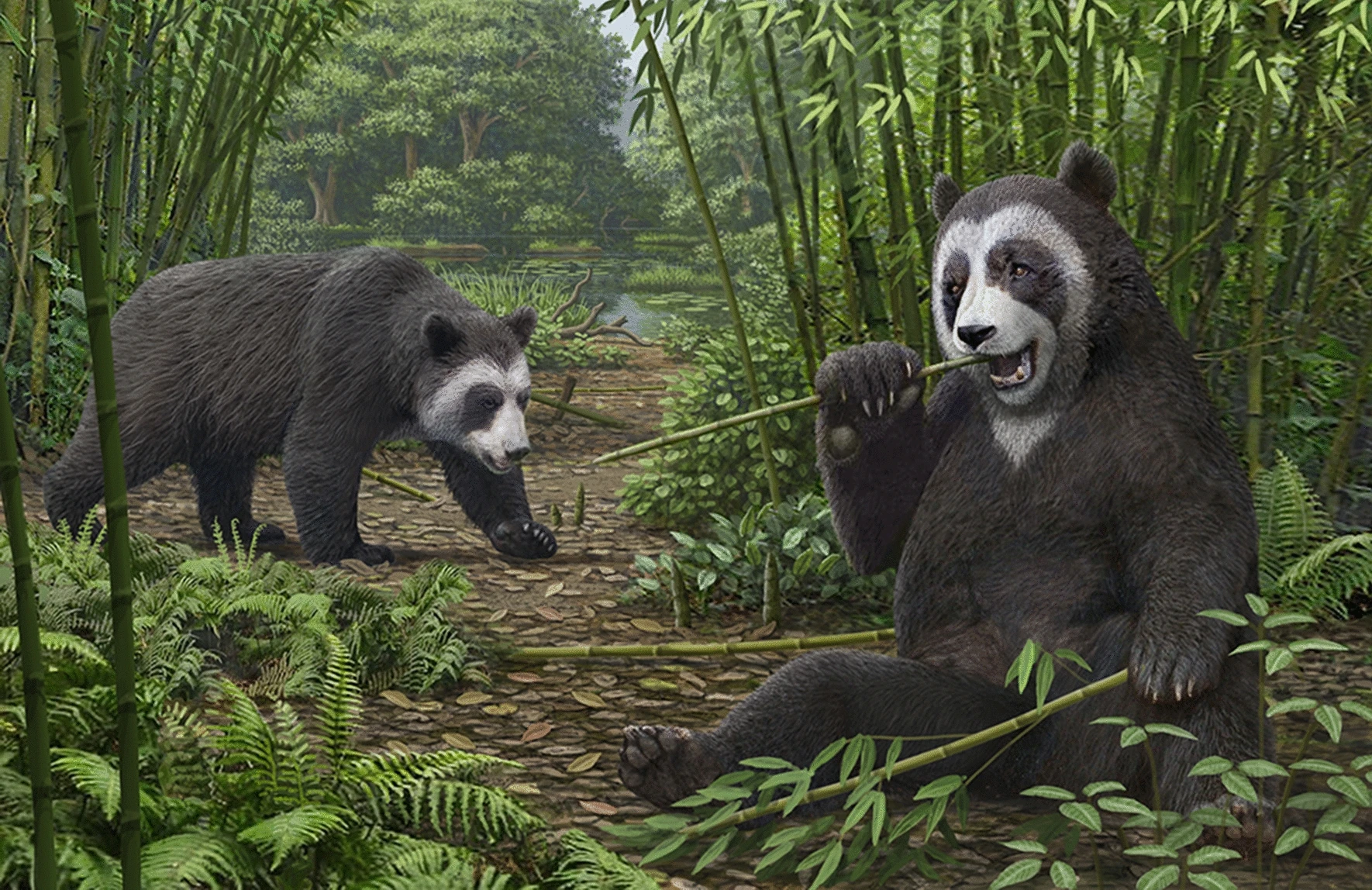
- Paleoart of two Ailurarctos

Scientific classification
- Kingdom: Animalia
- Phylum: Chordata
- Class: Mammalia
- Order: Carnivora
- Family: Ursidae
- Tribe: Ailuropodini
- Genus: †Ailurarctos; Qi et al., 1989

Type species
- †Ailurarctos lufengensis Qi et al., 1989

Species
- †A. lufengensis Qi et al., 1989 †A. yuanmouenensis Zong, 1997

= Ailurarctos =

Ailurarctos Temporal range: Late Miocene

Extinct genus of bears

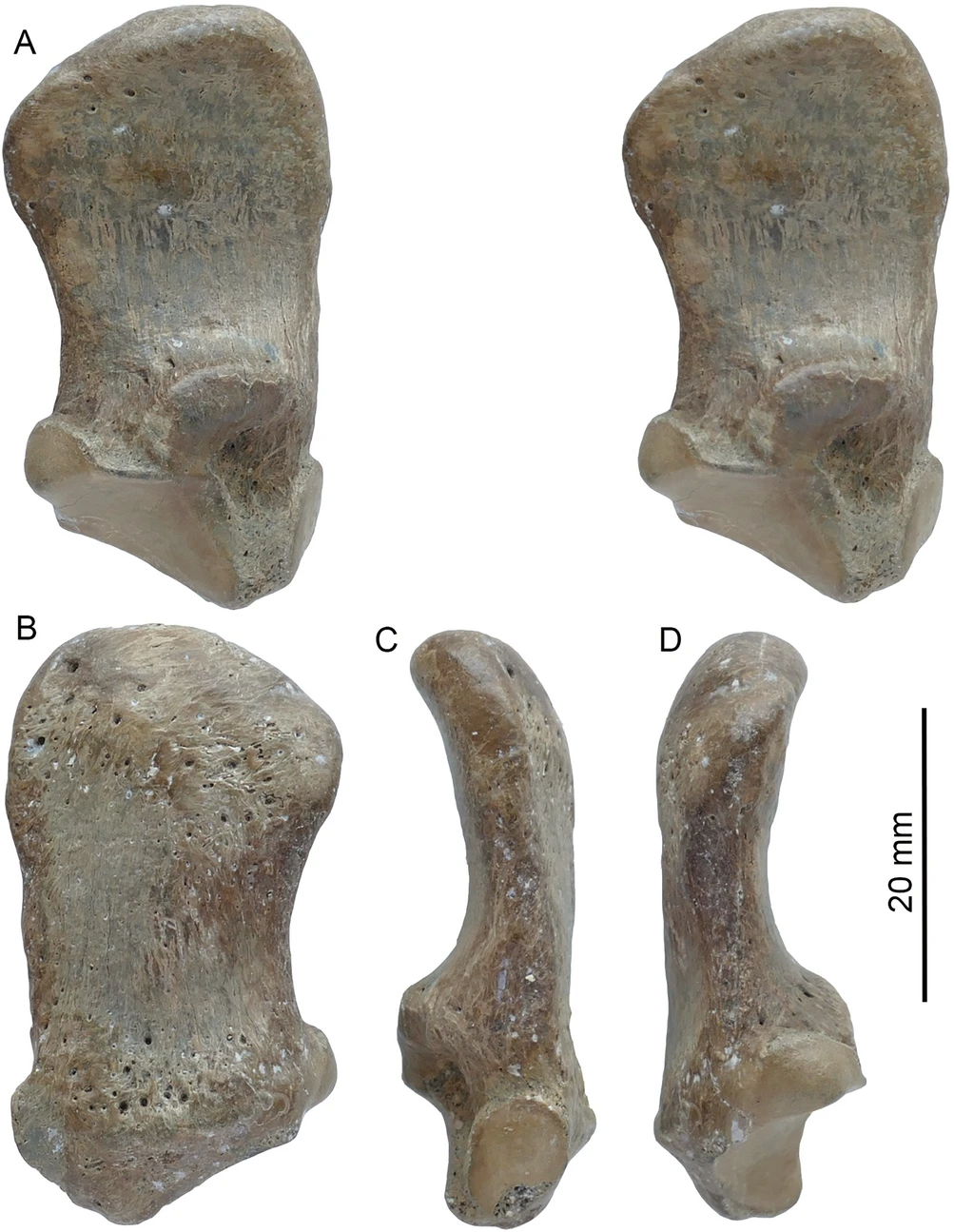
Ailurarctos left radial sesamoid fossil.

Ailurarctos ("cat bear") is an extinct genus of panda from the Late Miocene of China, some 8 million years ago. Fossils attributed to Ailurarctos lufengensis, including isolated teeth discovered in the Lufeng Bsain of Yunnan Province, represent some of the earliest evidence of the giant panda lineage in China.

Different teeth structures in the Ailuropoda lineage indicate a mosaic evolution during the past 2 million years. Like modern giant panda Ailuropoda melanoleuca, Ailurarctos had a false thumb (pseudothumb) that allowed it to grip bamboo. The earlist known pseudothumb is from the fossil of Ailurarctos discovered in Yunnan, China, suggesting that the panda's specialized bamboo diet goes back to as early as 6 to 7 million years ago. Compared to living giant pandas, Ailurarctos lack the sharp inward distal hook in their radial sesamoids.
