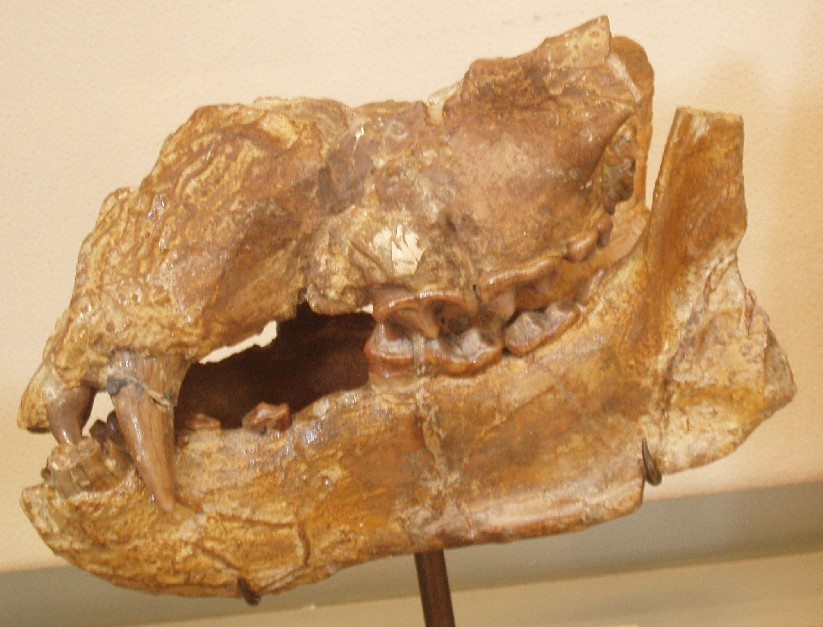
- Plithocyon armagnacensis skull at the Gallery of Paleontology and Comparative Anatomy, Paris.

Scientific classification
- Kingdom: Animalia
- Phylum: Chordata
- Class: Mammalia
- Order: Carnivora
- Family: Ursidae
- Subfamily: †Hemicyoninae
- Genus: †Plithocyon; Ginsburg, 1955

Species
- see text

= Plithocyon =

Plithocyon Temporal range: Miocene

Extinct genus of bears

Plithocyon is an extinct genus of hemicyonine bear of the Miocene epoch, endemic to North America and Europe. It lived from ~15.97—11.61 Ma, existing for approximately 4 million years.

== Fossil distribution ==
Sites and age of some specimens:

- Hemicyon Quarry, Barstow Formation, San Bernardino County, California ~13.7—11.6 Ma.
- Ruby River Basin No.5, Madison County, Montana ~23—5.3 Ma.
- Pasalar site, Bursa, Turkey ~16—13.7 Ma.
- Pontigne site, France ~11.6—7.2 Ma.

== Species ==
- Plithocyon antunesi Ginsburg & Morales, 1998
- Plithocyon armagnacensis Ginsburg, 1955
- Plithocyon barstowensis Frick, 1926
- Plithocyon bruneti Ginsburg, 1980
- Plithocyon conquense Ginsberg
- Plithocyon ursinus Cope, 1875
