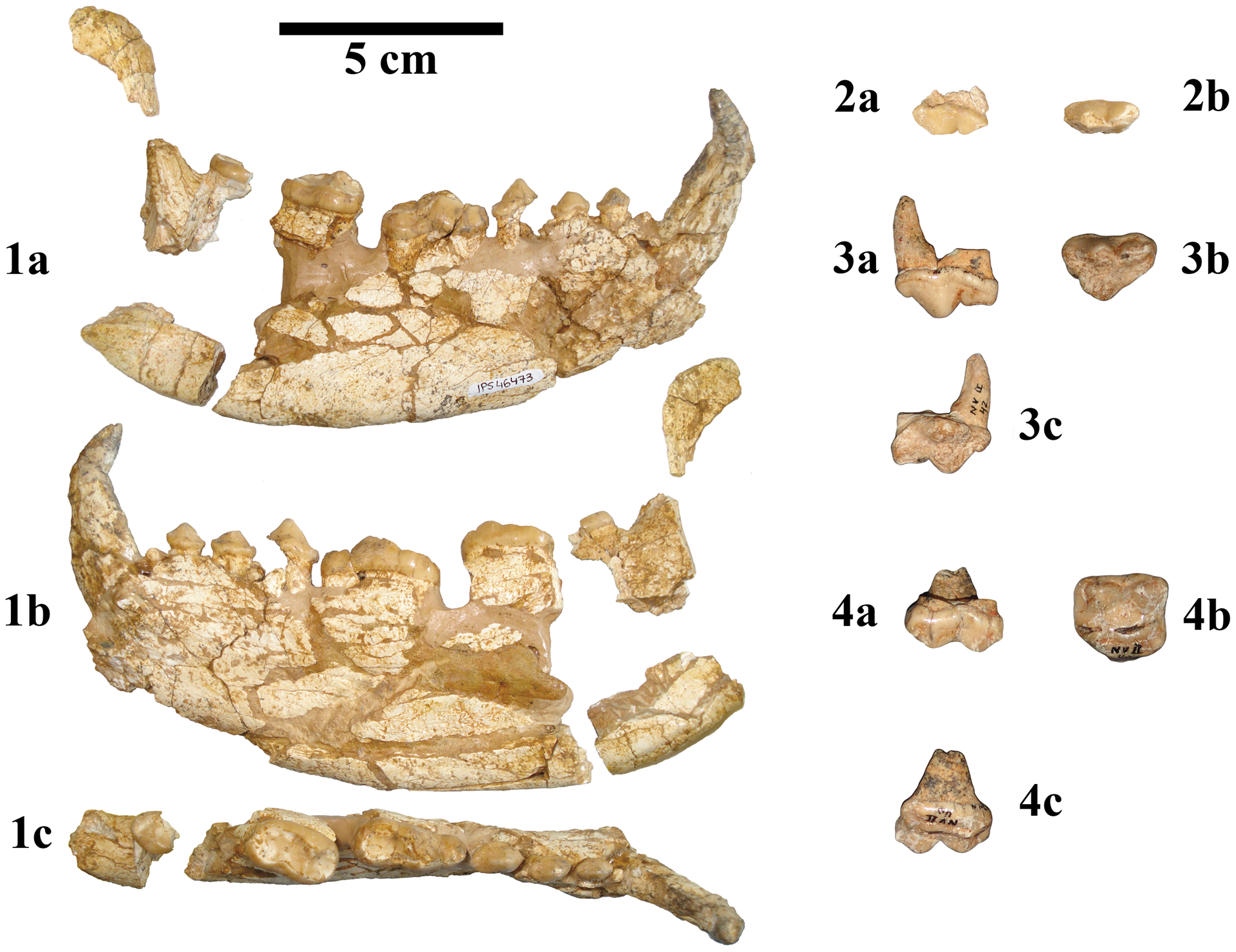
- Right jaw and teeth of Kretzoiarctos beatrix, seen from different angles.
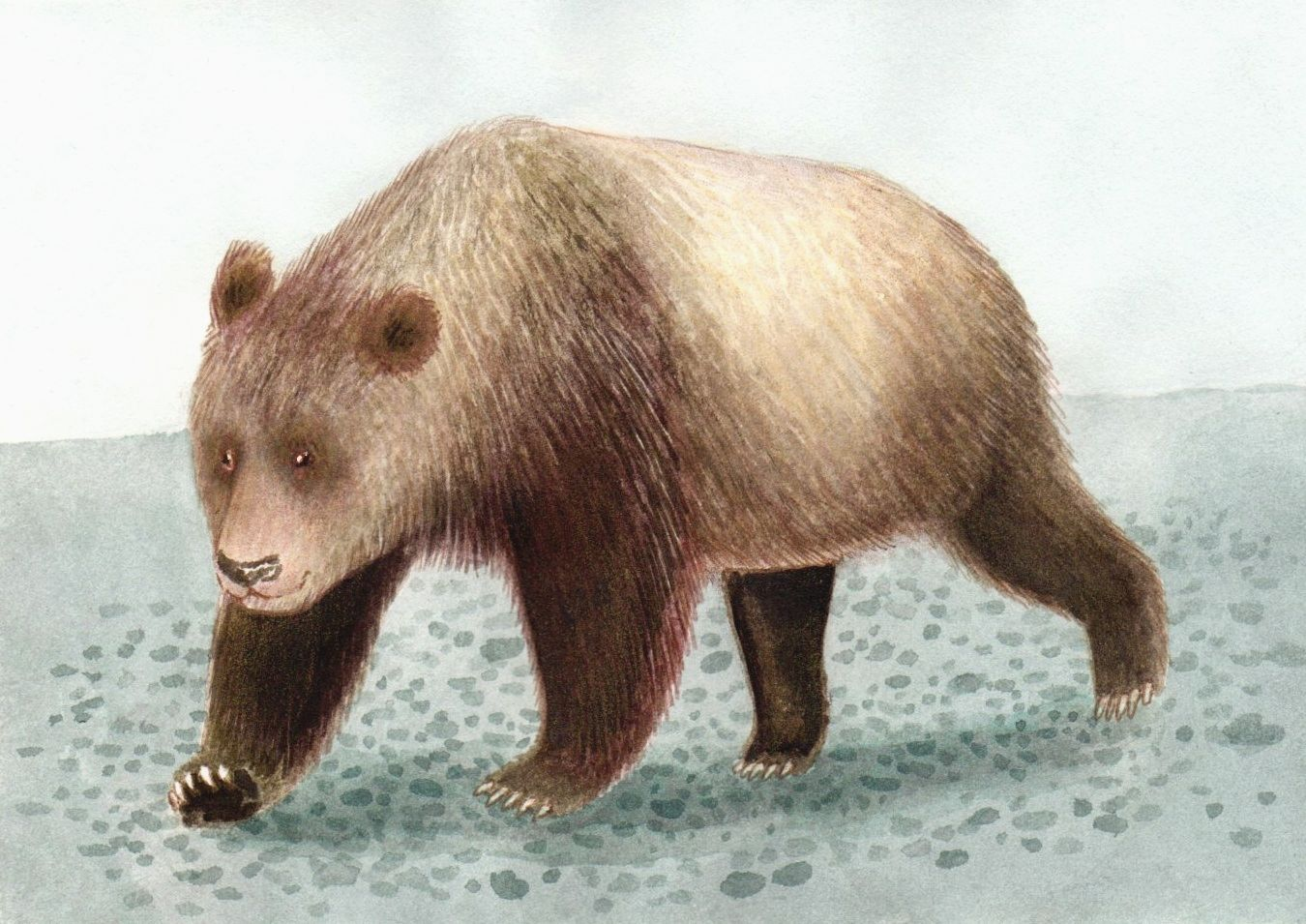
- Life reconstruction of Kretzoiarctos beatrix

Scientific classification
- Kingdom: Animalia
- Phylum: Chordata
- Class: Mammalia
- Infraclass: Placentalia
- Order: Carnivora
- Family: Ursidae
- Tribe: Ailuropodini
- Genus: †Kretzoiarctos; Abella et al., 2012

Type species
- †Agriarctos beatrix Abella et al., 2011

Species
- K. beatrix (Abella et al., 2011)

= Kretzoiarctos =

Kretzoiarctos Temporal range: Middle Miocene - Late Miocene

Extinct genus of bears

Kretzoiarctos is an extinct bear genus from the European Miocene. It consists of Kretzoiarctos beatrix, an ancestor of the extant giant panda.

== Description ==
Kretzoiarctos beatrix was originally described in 2011 as Agriarctos beatrix, before being reclassified into a new genus. The scientific name commemorates the Hungarian geologist and paleontologist Miklós Kretzoi.

Kretzoiarctos beatrix are panda-like creatures and are an ancestral group of the Ailuropodinae subfamily according to fossil records from the Middle Miocene of Spain. Based on tooth structure, researchers have speculated that this species may have been a small herbivorous animal that ate very hard plants. The giant panda (Ailuropoda melanoleuca) has a special craniodental structure that serves as a durophagous feeding adaptation for bamboo, and a similar tooth structure was also found in K. beatrix, indicating that this species may be the oldest relative of the giant panda and might have resembled it in appearance.

== Diet and feeding adaptation ==
Unlike most of the Ursoidea species, K. beatrix had strong distal cusps on the premolars and a relatively forward-positioned metaconid. In addition, K. beatrix had a more strongly developed sectorial blade in the trigonid, and relatively shorter second molar talonid. These traits indicate a need for pronounced chewing and grinding, and suggest that these enhanced molars and premolars were evolved to more efficiently break down hard plant tissues. The fossil records for these teeth structure suggest that the early development of the distal and mesial cusps on the premolars of K. beatrix may indicate an evolutionary trend towards more complex premolars for the plant-feeding Ursoidea species, and may explain why extant giant pandas have very complex molars. Dental microwear texture analysis (DMTA) has found that K. beatrix from the locality of Hammerschmiede suggests it was an opportunistic feeder and that it occasionally consumed meat.

== Extinction ==
A hypothetical explanation for the extinction of K. beatrix is based on climate and environmental changes. In the early Turolian, high precipitation and humid environments in Western Europe favored smaller plant-feeding animals like the Kretzoiarctos species. However, severe climate changes during the Late Miocene led to widespread extinctions. A crucial event in this period is the Messinian salinity crisis, a huge decrease in the Mediterranean Sea level due to evaporation and desiccation. This has been put forward as a possible cause for the significant decline in Ursidae species diversity in the Late Miocene, including the species of the genus Kretzoiarctos.
