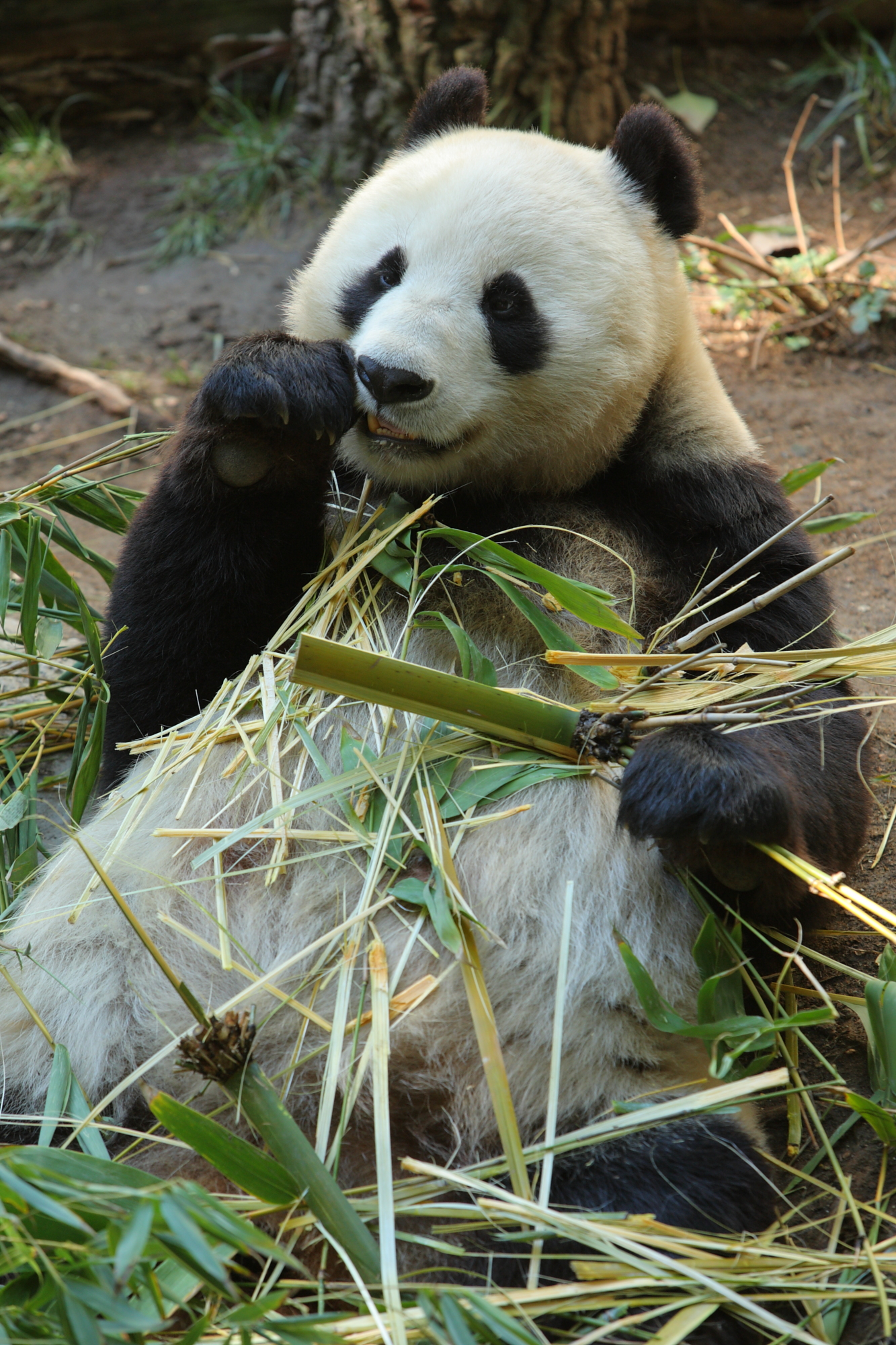
- Giant panda (Ailuropoda melanoleuca) - this image is of Bai Yun who featured on Wikipedia DYK on 2026-10-01

Scientific classification
- Kingdom: Animalia
- Phylum: Chordata
- Class: Mammalia
- Order: Carnivora
- Family: Ursidae
- Subfamily: Ailuropodinae; Grevé, 1894

Tribes and genera
- Tribe †Agriotheriini; Tribe Ailuropodini Grevé, 1894; Ailuropoda; †Agriarctos; †Ailurarctos; †Kretzoiarctos

= Ailuropodinae =

Ailuropodinae Temporal range: Early Miocene – present

Subfamily of bears

Ailuropodinae is a subfamily of Ursidae that contains only one extant species, the giant panda (Ailuropoda melanoleuca) of China. The fossil record of this group has shown that various species of pandas were more widespread across the Holarctic, with species found in places such as Europe, much of Asia, North America and even Africa. The earliest pandas were not unlike other modern bear species in that they had an omnivorous diet but by around 2.4 million years ago, pandas had evolved to be more herbivorous. The giant panda (Ailuropoda) belongs to the order of Carnivora, meaning that the macronutrients it digests are more similar to those found in carnivores' diets than those found in herbivores' diets, even though pandas eat mainly bamboo.

== Systematics ==
Ever since the giant panda was first described to science, they have been a source of taxonomic confusion, having been variously classified as a member of Procyonidae, Ursidae, Ailuridae, or even their own family Ailuropodidae. Part of their similarities with the red panda is in particular the presence of a "thumb" and five fingers; the "thumb" – a modified sesamoid bone – that helps it to hold bamboo while eating.

Recent genetic studies have shown that ailuropodines are indeed members of the bear family as they are not closely related to red pandas, which are placed in their own family Ailuridae. Any similarities between ailuropodines and ailurids are likely due to convergent evolution as the fossil record has shown the "false thumb" has been required independently for different purposes. The "false thumb" has been found in spectacled bears as well, suggesting that it is a plesiomorphic trait among bears that became lost in the Ursinae subfamily.

=== Taxonomy ===
The ailuropodines are divided into two tribes the extinct Agriotheriini and Ailuropodini; the following taxonomy below is after Abella et al. (2012):

- Subfamily Ailuropodinae Grevé, 1894
  - Tribe †Agriotheriini Kretzoi, 1929
    - †Agriotherium Wagner, 1837
      - †Agriotherium africanum Hendey, 1972
      - †Agriotherium gregoryi Frick, 1926
      - †Agriotherium hendeyi Jiangzuo & Flynn, 2019
      - †Agriotherium inexpetans Qiu et al., 1991
      - †Agriotherium insigne Gervais, 1859
      - †Agriotherium myanmarensis Ogino et al., 2011
      - †Agriotherium palaeindicus Lydekker, 1878
      - †Agriotherium sivalensis (Falconer & Cautley, 1836)
    - †Huracan Jiangzuo et al., 2023
      - †Huracan coffeyi (Dalquest, 1986)
      - †Huracan qiui Jiangzhou et al., 2023
      - †Huracan schneideri (Sellards, 1916)
      - †Huracan? punjabensis (Lydekker, 1884) [Indarctos punjabensis (Lydekker, 1884)]
      - †Huracan? roblesi (Morales & Aguirre, 1976) [Agriotherium roblesi Morales & Aguirre, 1976]
    - †Indarctos Pilgrim, 1913
      - †Indarctos anthracitis (Weithofer, 1888)
      - †Indarctos arctoides (Deperet, 1895)
      - †Indarctos atticus (Weithofer, 1888)
      - †Indarctos bakalovi (Kovachev, 1988)
      - †Indarctos lagrelli (Zdansky, 1924)
      - †Indarctos nevadensis Macdonald, 1959
      - †Indarctos oregonensis Merriam et al., 1916
      - †Indarctos salmontanus Pilgrim, 1913
      - †Indarctos sinensis (Zdansky, 1924)
      - †Indarctos vireti Villalta & Crusafont, 1943
      - †Indarctos zdanskyi Qiu & Tedford, 2003
    - ?†Miomaci de Bonis et al., 2017
      - †Miomaci pannonicum de Bonis et al., 2017
  - Tribe Ailuropodini Grevé, 1894
    - Ailuropoda Milne-Edwards, 1870
      - Ailuropoda melanoleuca David, 1869 – giant panda
      - †Ailuropoda baconi Woodward 1915
      - †Ailuropoda microta Pei, 1962
      - †Ailuropoda wulingshanensis Wang & Alii, 1982
    - †Agriarctos Kretzoi, 1942
      - †Agriarctos depereti (Schlosser, 1902)
      - †Agriarctos gaali Kretzoi, 1942
      - †Agriarctos nikolovi Jiangzuo & Spassov, 2022
      - †Agriarctos vighi Kretzoi, 1942
    - †Ailurarctos Qi et al., 1989
      - †Ailurarctos lufengensis Qi et al., 1989
      - †Ailurarctos yuanmouensis Zong, 1997
    - †Kretzoiarctos Abella et al., 2012
      - †Kretzoiarctos beatrix Abella et al., 2011
