= Phoberocyon =

Phoberocyon Temporal range: Early Miocene

Scientific classification
- Kingdom: Animalia
- Phylum: Chordata
- Class: Mammalia
- Order: Carnivora
- Family: Ursidae
- Subfamily: †Hemicyoninae
- Genus: †Phoberocyon; Ginsburg, 1955

Species
- See text

Extinct genus of bears

Phoberocyon is a large extinct genus of hemicyonine bear, found primarily in North America during the Miocene. It lived from 28.4 to 13.7 mya, existing for approximately 14 million years. One species, P. hispanicus, is known from Miocene Spain.

== Species ==
- Phoberocyon hispanicus Ginsburg & Morales, 1998
- Phoberocyon dehmi Ginsburg, 1955
- Phoberocyon aurelianensis Mayet, 1908
- Phoberocyon johnhenryi White, 1947
- Phoberocyon huerzeleri Ginsburg, 1955
