= Late Pleistocene extinctions =

Extinction of large animals at the end of the last Ice Age

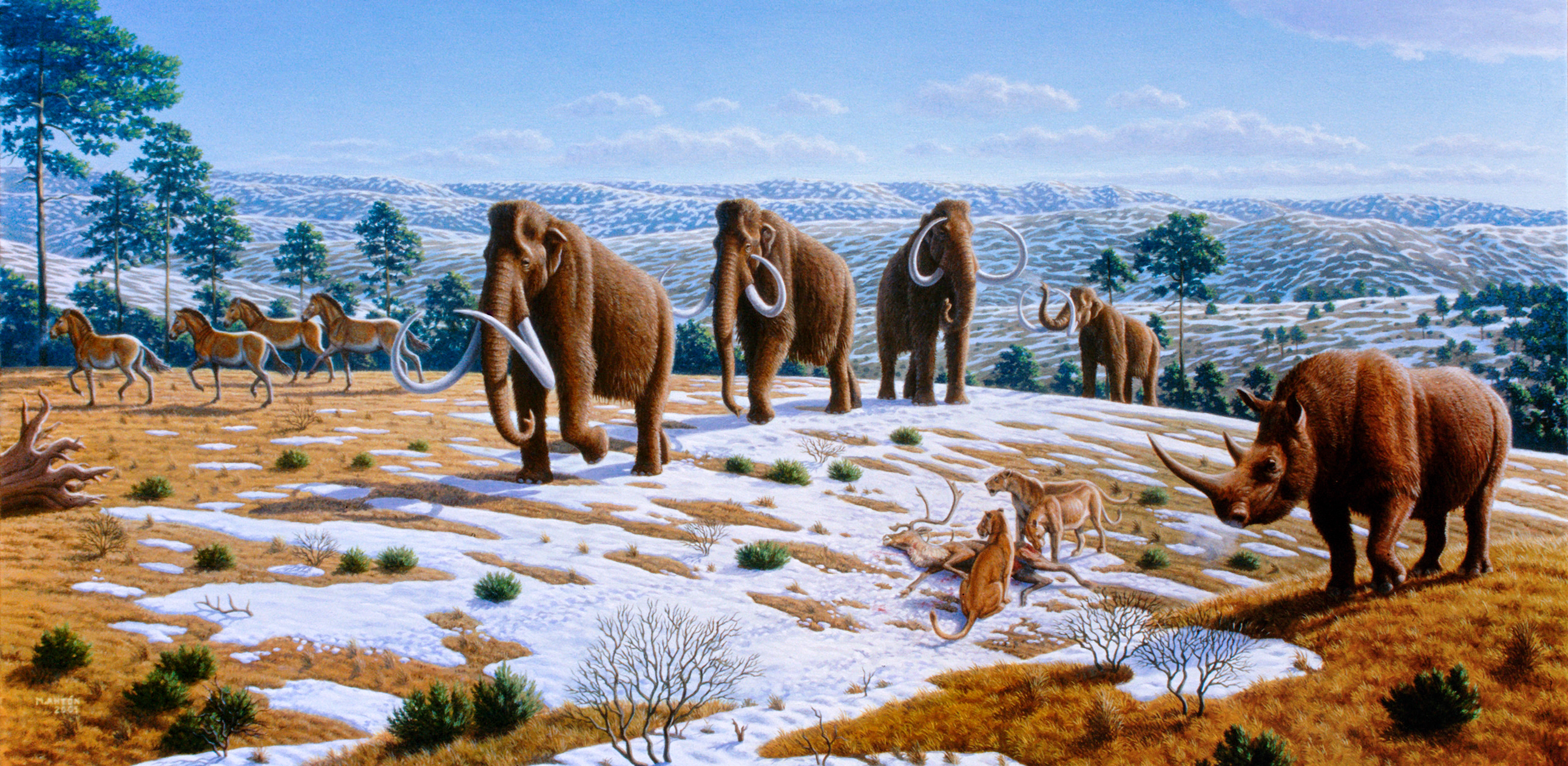
Late Pleistocene in northern Spain, by Mauricio Antón. Left to right: wild horse, woolly mammoth, reindeer, cave lion, woolly rhinoceros

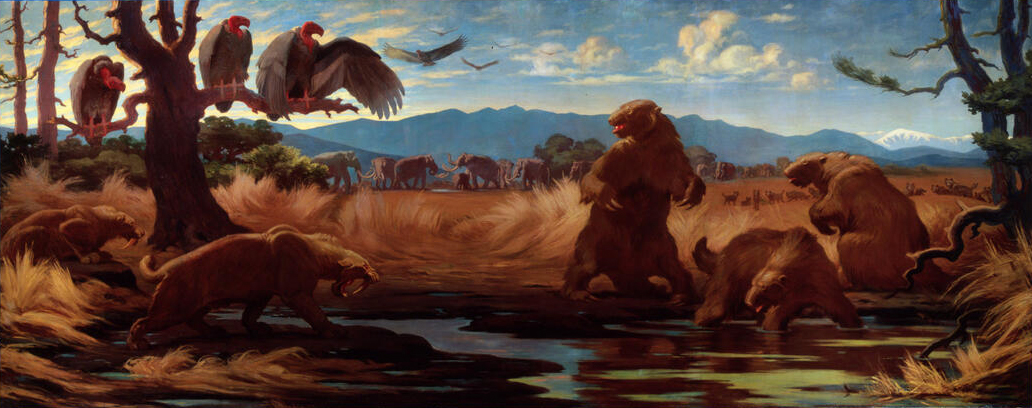
Mural of the La Brea Tar Pits by Charles R. Knight, including sabertooth cats (Smilodon fatalis, left) ground sloths (Paramylodon harlani, right) and Columbian mammoths (Mammuthus columbi, background)

The Late Pleistocene to the beginning of the Holocene saw the extinction of the majority of the world's megafauna, which are typically defined as animal species having body masses of 45 kg (99 lb) or more, which resulted in a collapse in faunal density and diversity across the globe. The extinctions during the Late Pleistocene are differentiated from previous extinctions by their extreme size bias towards large animals (with small animals being largely unaffected), the widespread absence of ecological succession to replace these extinct megafaunal species, and the regime shift of previously established faunal relationships and habitats as a consequence. The timing and severity of the extinctions varied by region and are generally thought to have been driven by the globally expanding population of modern humans, climatic change, or a combination of both. Human impact on megafauna populations is thought to have been driven by hunting ("overkill"), as well as possibly environmental alteration. The relative importance of human versus climatic factors in the extinctions has been the subject of long-running controversy, though most scholars support at least a contributory role of humans in the extinctions.

Major extinctions occurred in Australia-New Guinea (Sahul) beginning around 50,000 years ago and in the Americas about 13,000 years ago, coinciding in time with the migration of modern humans into these regions. Extinctions in northern Eurasia were staggered over tens of thousands of years between 50,000 and 10,000 years ago, while extinctions in the Americas were virtually simultaneous, spanning only 3,000 years at most. Overall, during the Late Pleistocene about 65% of all megafaunal species worldwide became extinct, rising to 72% in North America, 83% in South America and 88% in Australia, with all mammals over 1,000 kg (2,200 lb) becoming extinct in Australia and the Americas, and around 80% globally. Africa, South Asia, and Southeast Asia experienced more moderate extinctions than other regions.

The Late Pleistocene-early Holocene megafauna extinctions have often been seen as part of a single extinction event with later, widely agreed to be human-caused extinctions in the mid-late Holocene, such as those on Madagascar and New Zealand, as the Late Quaternary extinction event.

== Extinctions by biogeographic realm ==
=== Summary ===
Extinctions range of the continental large and medium-sized mammals from 40,000 to 4,000 years BP in different biogeographic realms
Biogeographic realm	Giants (over 1,000 kg)			Very large (400–1,000 kg)			Large (150–400 kg)			Moderately large (50–150 kg)			Medium (10–50 kg)			Total			Regions included
Biogeographic realm	Start	Loss	%	Start	Loss	%	Start	Loss	%	Start	Loss	%	Start	Loss	%	Start	Loss	%	Regions included
Afrotropic	6	−1	16.6%	4	−1	25%	25	−3	12%	32	0	0%	69	−2	2.9%	136	-7	5.1%	Trans-Saharan Africa and Arabia
Indomalaya	5	−2	40%	6	−1	16.7%	10	−1	10%	20	−3	15%	56	−1	1.8%	97	-8	8.2%	Indian subcontinent, Southeast Asia, and southern China
Palearctic	8	−8	100%	10	−5	50%	14	−5	35.7%	23	−3	15%	41	−1	2.4%	96	-22	22.9%	Eurasia and North Africa
Nearctic	5	−5	100%	10	−8	80%	26	−22	84.6%	20	−13	65%	25	−9	36%	86	-57	66%	North America
Neotropic	9	−9	100%	12	−12	100%	17	−14	82%	20	−11	55%	35	−5	14.3%	93	-51	54%	South America, Central America, South Florida, and the Caribbean
Australasia	4	−4	100%	5	−5	100%	6	−6	100%	16	−13	81.2%	25	−10	40%	56	-38	67%	Australia, New Guinea, New Zealand, and neighbouring islands.
Global	33	−26	78.8%	46	−31	67.4%	86	−47	54.7%	113	−41	36.3%	215	−23	10.7%	493	-168	34%	

=== Introduction ===
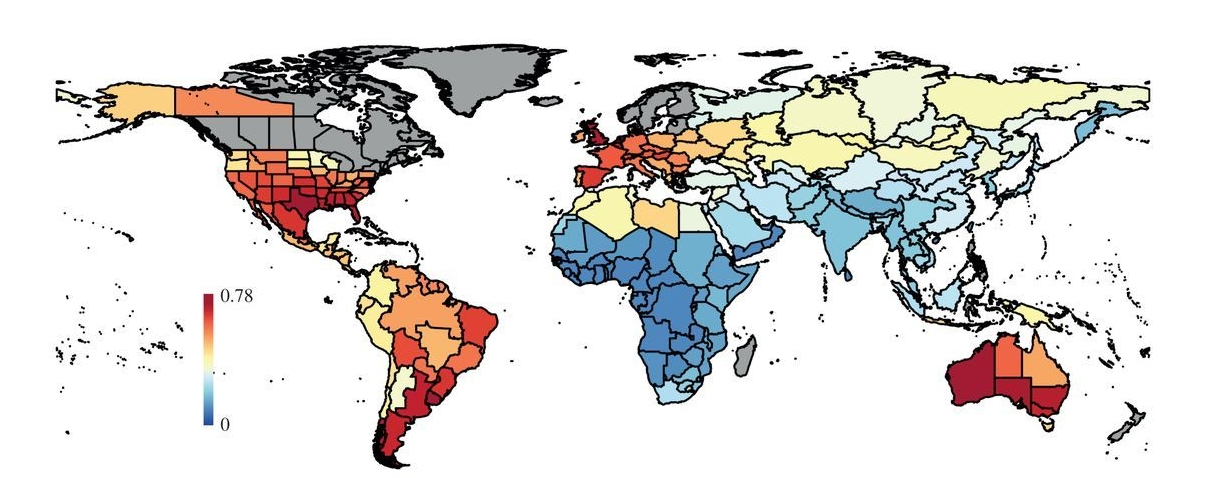
The proportion of extinct large mammal species (more than or equal to 10 kg (22 lb)) in each country during the last 132,000 years, only counting extinctions earlier than 1000 years BP (Note, Gray Areas on continents indicate land entirely covered in Glacial Ice at the time, and on islands, that man had not yet reached by this time i.e. no data either way)

The Late Pleistocene saw the extinction of many mammals weighing 40 kilograms (88 lb) or more, including around 80% of mammals weighing 1,000 kilograms (2,200 lb) or more. The proportion of megafauna extinctions is progressively larger the further the human migratory distance from Africa, with the highest extinction rates in Australia, and North and South America.

The increased extent of extinction mirrors the migration pattern of modern humans: the further away from Africa, the more recently humans inhabited the area, the less time those environments (including its megafauna) had to become accustomed to humans (and vice versa).

There are two main hypotheses to explain this extinction:

- Climate change associated with the advance and retreat of major ice caps or ice sheets causing reduction in favorable habitat.
- Human hunting causing attrition of megafauna populations, commonly known as "overkill".

There are some inconsistencies between the current available data and the prehistoric overkill hypothesis. For instance, there are ambiguities around the timing of Australian megafauna extinctions. Evidence supporting the prehistoric overkill hypothesis includes the persistence of megafauna on some islands for millennia past the disappearance of their continental cousins. For instance, ground sloths survived on the Antilles long after North and South American ground sloths were extinct, woolly mammoths died out on remote Wrangel Island 6,000 years after their extinction on the mainland, and Steller's sea cows persisted off the isolated and uninhabited Commander Islands for thousands of years after they had vanished from the continental shores of the north Pacific. The later disappearance of these island species correlates with the later colonization of these islands by humans.

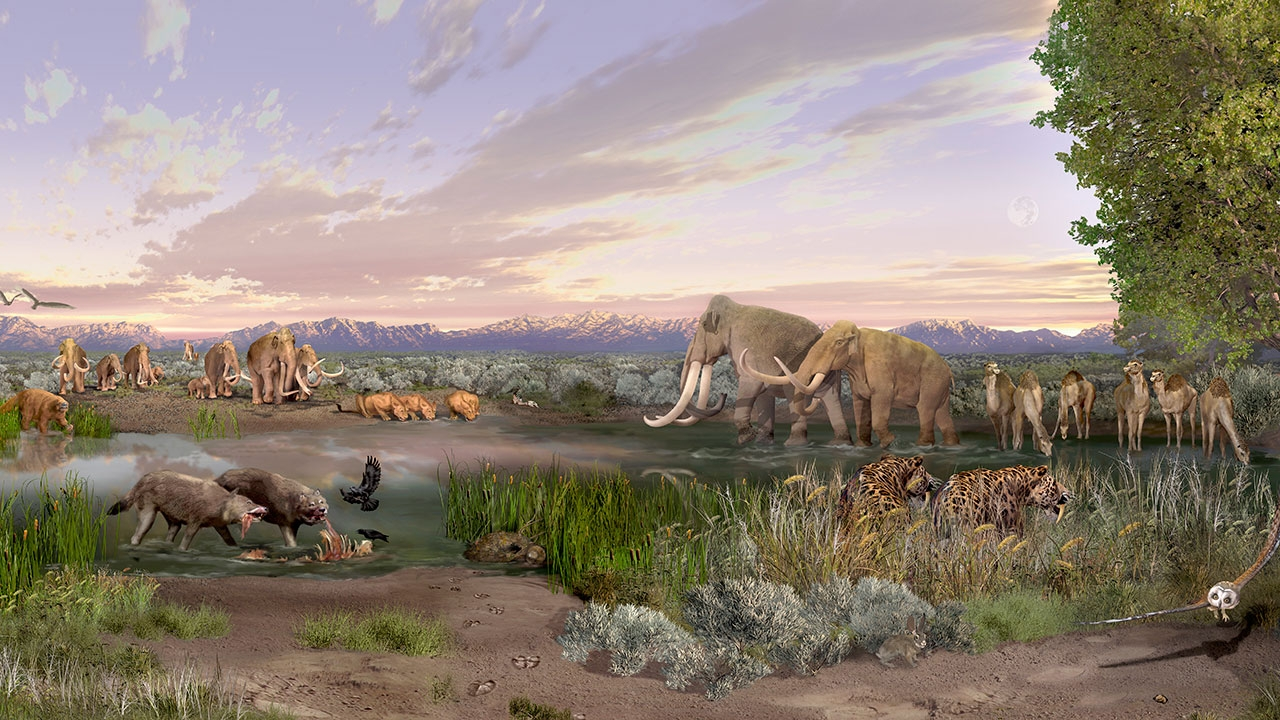
Environment of what is now White Sands National Park in New Mexico, with Columbian mammoths, a ground sloth, dire wolves, lions, camels, and saber-toothed cats.

Still, there are some arguments that species responded differently to environmental changes, and no one factor by itself explains the large variety of extinctions. The causes may involve the interplay of climate change, competition between species, unstable population dynamics, and hunting as well as competition by humans.

The original debates as to whether human arrival times or climate change constituted the primary cause of megafaunal extinctions necessarily were based on paleontological evidence coupled with geological dating techniques. Recently, genetic analyses of surviving megafaunal populations have contributed new evidence, leading to the conclusion: "The inability of climate to predict the observed population decline of megafauna, especially during the past 75,000 years, implies that human impact became the main driver of megafauna dynamics around this date."

=== Africa ===
Although Africa was one of the least affected regions, the region still suffered extinctions, particularly around the Late Pleistocene-Holocene transition. These extinctions were likely predominantly climatically driven by changes to grassland habitats.

- Ungulates
  - Even-Toed Ungulates
    - Suidae (swine)
      - Metridiochoerus (ssp.)
      - Kolpochoerus (ssp.)
    - Bovidae (bovines, antelope)
      - Giant buffalo (Syncerus antiquus)
      - Megalotragus
      - Rusingoryx
      - Southern springbok (Antidorcas australis)
      - Bond's springbok (Antidorcas bondi)
      - Damaliscus hypsodon
      - Damaliscus niro
      - Gazella atlantica
      - Gazella tingitana
      - Caprinae
        - Makapania?
    - Deer (Cervidae)
      - Megaceroides algericus (North Africa)
  - Odd-toed Ungulates
    - Rhinoceros (Rhinocerotidae).
      - Narrow-nosed rhinoceros (Stephanorhinus hemitoechus, North Africa)
      - Ceratotherium mauritanicum
    - Wild Equus spp.
      - Caballine horses
        - Equus algericus (North Africa)
      - Subgenus Asinus (asses)
        - Equus melkiensis (North Africa)
      - Subgenis Hippotigris (Zebras)
        - Cape zebra (Equus capensis)
        - Equus mauritanicus (North Africa).
- Proboscidea
  - Elephantidae (elephants)
    - Palaeoloxodon jolensis? (other authors suggest that this taxon went extinct at the latest Middle Pleistocene)
- Rodentia
  - Paraethomys filfilae?
- Crocodilia
  - Crocodylus sudani

=== South Asia and Southeast Asia ===
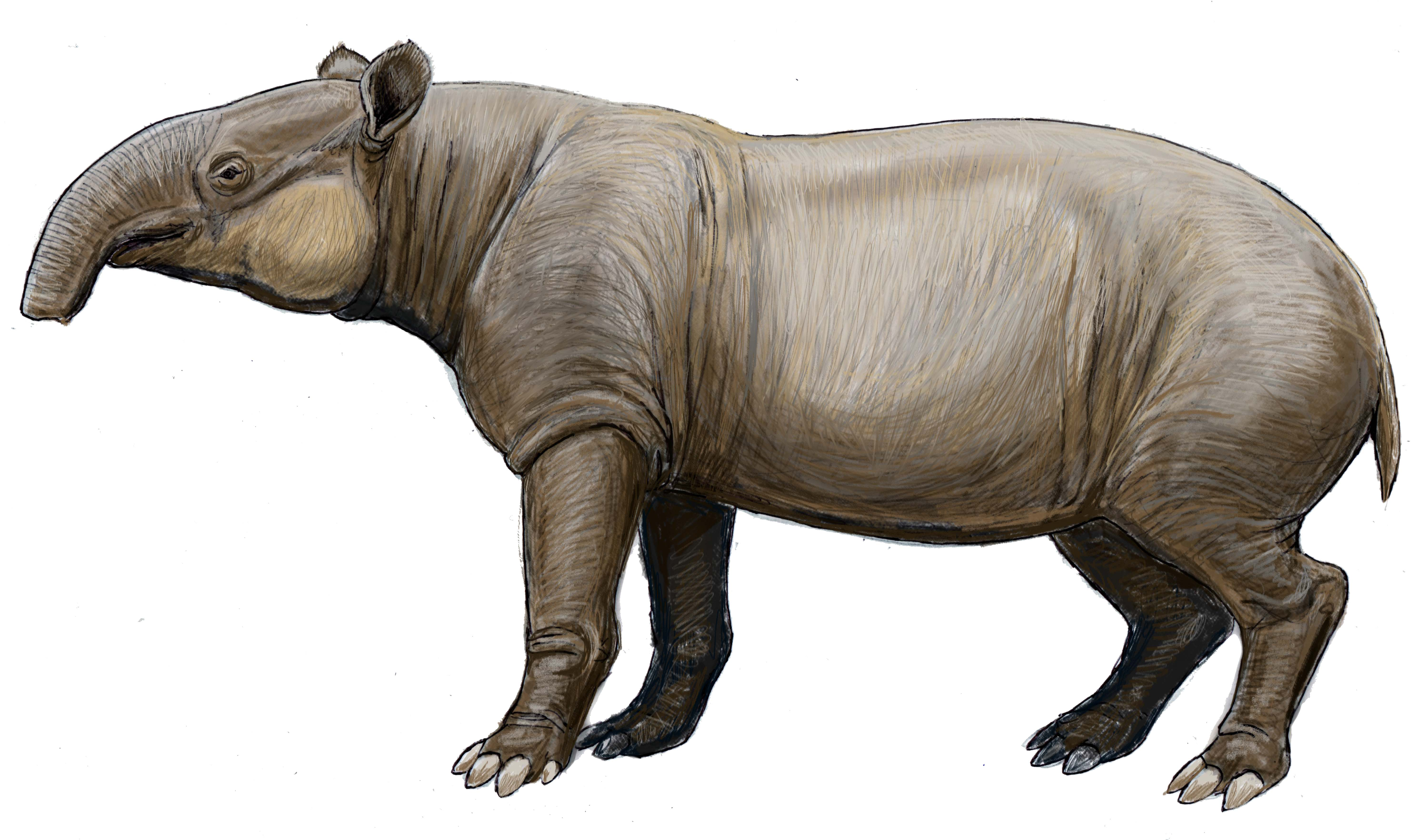
Giant tapir (Tapirus augustus) restoration

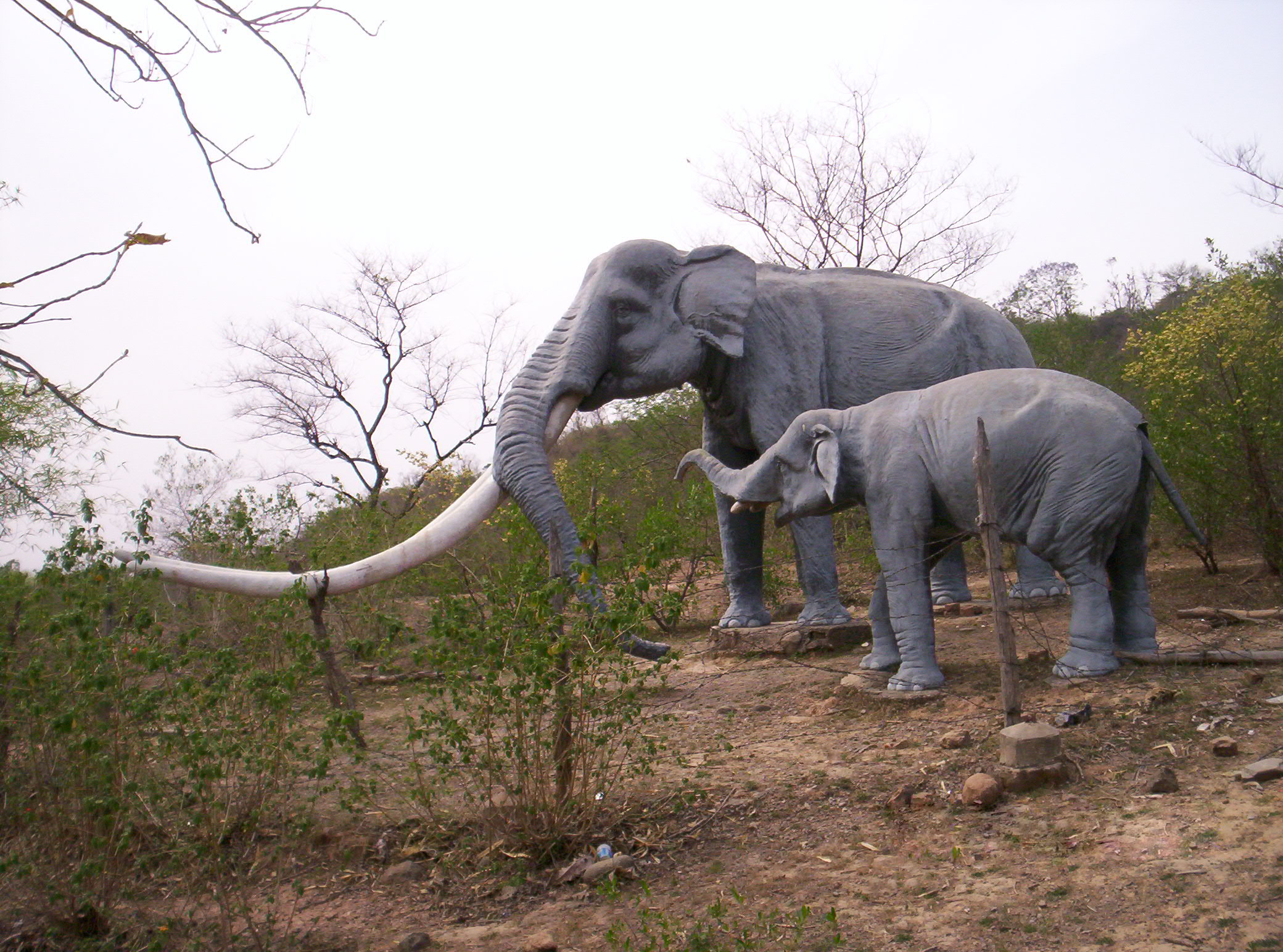
Life-sized models of Stegodon

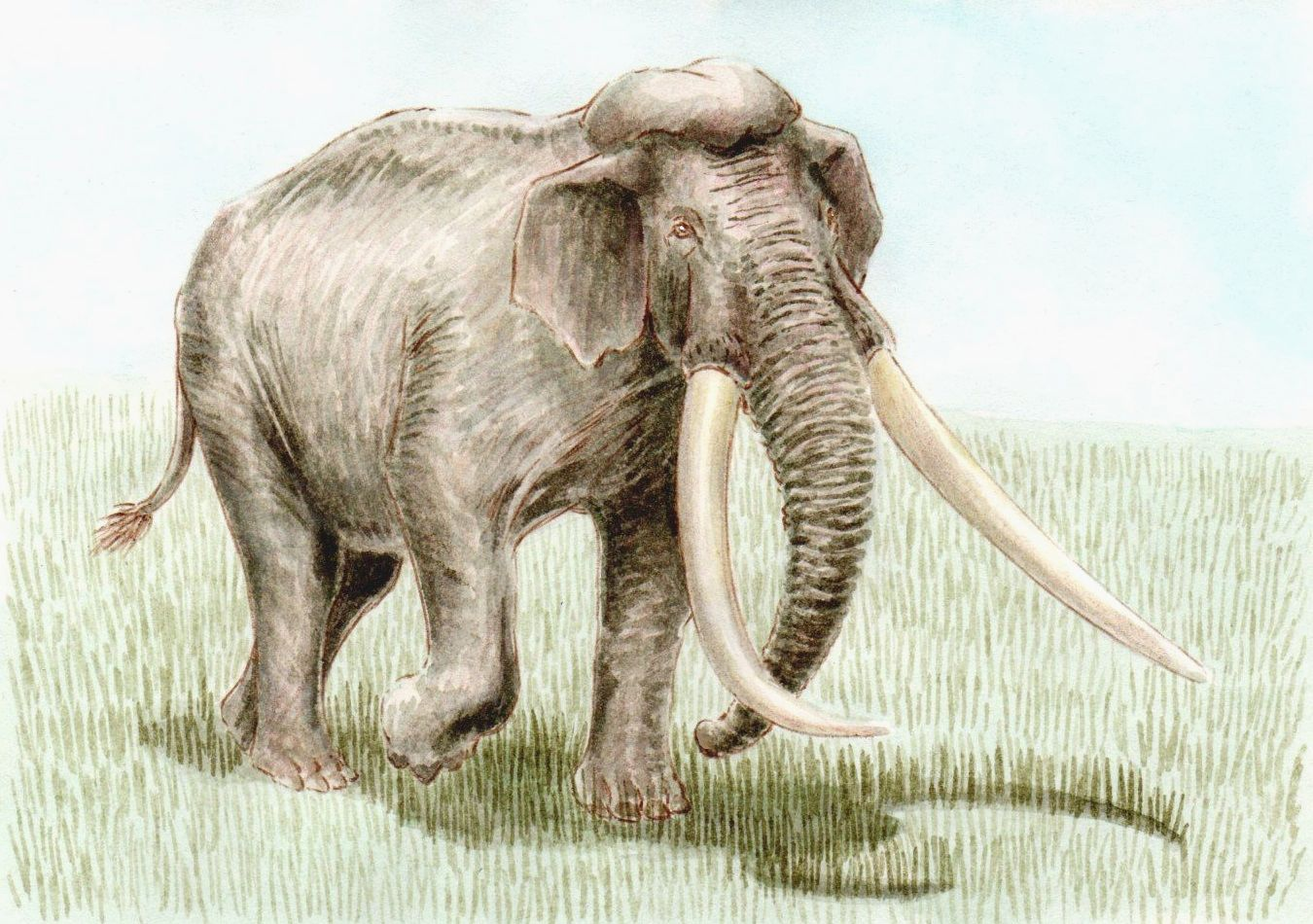
Palaeoloxodon namadicus

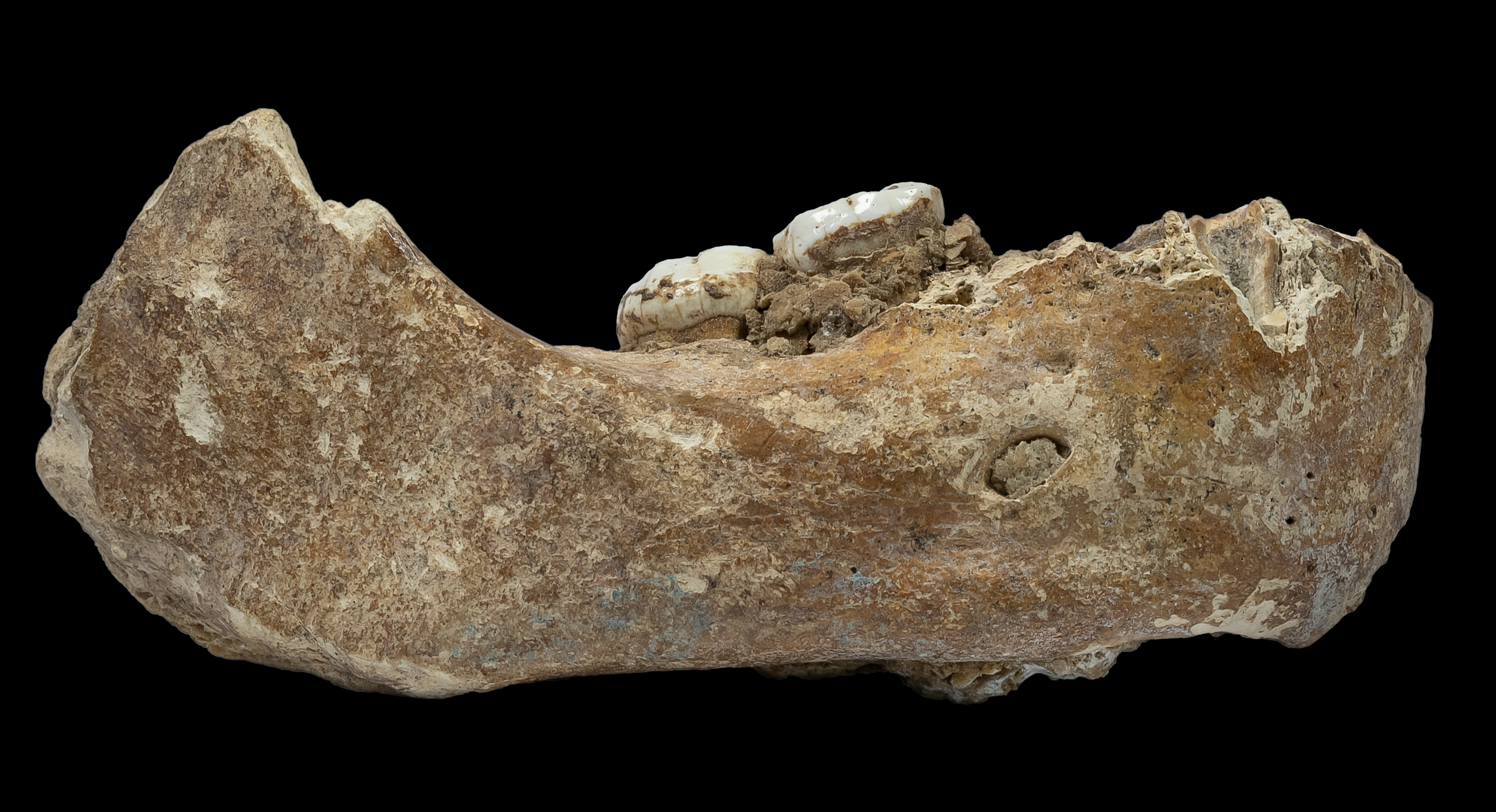
Fossil jaw (Xiahe mandible) of a denisovan

The timing of extinctions on the Indian subcontinent is uncertain due to a lack of reliable dating. Similar issues have been reported for Chinese sites, though there is no evidence for any of the megafaunal taxa having survived into the Holocene in that region. Extinctions in Southeast Asia and Southern China have been proposed to be the result of environmental shift from open to closed forested habitats.

- Ungulates
  - Even-Toed Ungulates
    - Several Bovidae spp.
      - Bos palaesondaicus (ancestor to the banteng)
      - Cebu tamaraw (Bubalus cebuensis)
      - Bubalus grovesi
      - Short-horned water buffalo (Bubalus mephistopheles)
      - Bubalus palaeokerabau
    - Hippopotamidae
      - Hexaprotodon (Indian subcontinent and Southeast Asia)
  - Odd-toed Ungulates
    - Equus spp.
      - Equus namadicus (Indian subcontinent)
      - Yunnan horse (Equus yunanensis)
    - Giant tapir (Tapirus augustus, Southeast Asia and Southern China)
- Pholidota (pangolins)
  - Manis palaeojavanica
- Carnivora
  - Ursidae (bears)
    - Ailuropoda baconi (ancestor to the giant panda, which it is often considered a subspecies of distinctiveness from the living species has been disputed)
  - Hyaenidae (hyenas)
    - Cave hyena (Crocuta (Crocuta) ultima East Asia and Mainland Southeast Asia)
- Afrotheria
  - Proboscideans
    - Stegodontidae
      - Stegodon spp. (including Stegodon florensis on Flores, Stegodon orientalis in East and Southeast Asia, and Stegodon sp. in the Indian subcontinent)
    - Elephantidae
      - Palaeoloxodon spp.
        - Palaeoloxodon namadicus (Indian subcontinent, possibly also Southeast Asia)
- Birds
  - Shiriyanetta hasegawai (a flightless duck native to Japan)
  - Leptoptilos robustus
  - Ostriches (Struthio) (Indian subcontinent)
- Reptiles
  - Crocodylia
    - Alligator munensis?
  - Testudines (turtles and tortoises)
    - Manouria oyamai
- Primates
  - Several simian (Simiiformes) spp.
    - Pongo (orangutans)
      - Pongo weidenreichi (South China)
    - Various Homo spp. (archaic humans)
      - Homo erectus soloensis (Java)
      - Homo floresiensis (Flores)
      - Homo luzonensis (Luzon, Philippines)
      - Denisovans (Homo sp.)

=== Europe, Northern and East Asia ===
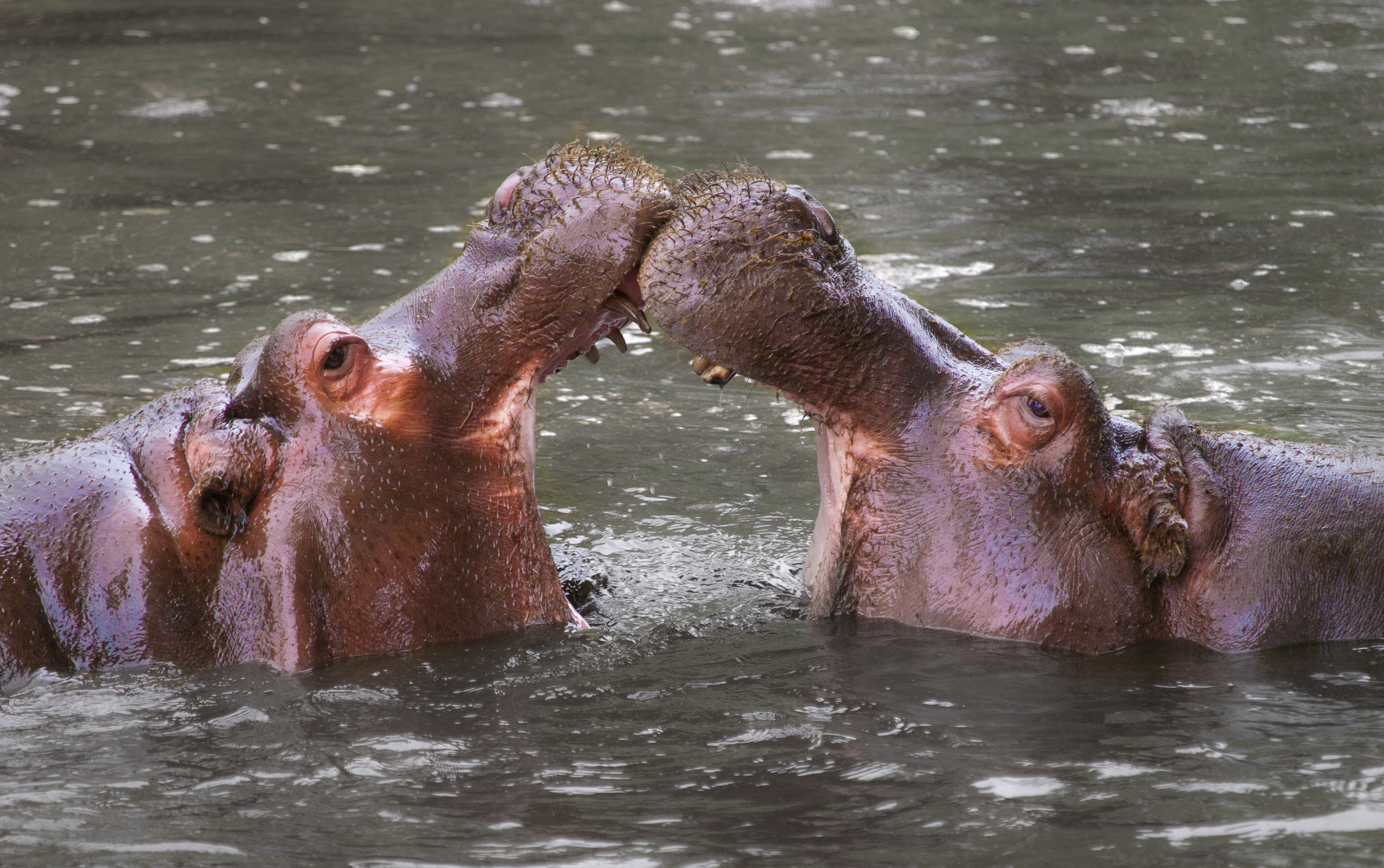
Hippopotamus (Hippopotamus amphibius) formerly inhabited Europe as far north as Great Britain at the beginning of the Late Pleistocene, becoming extinct in Europe around 30,000 years ago

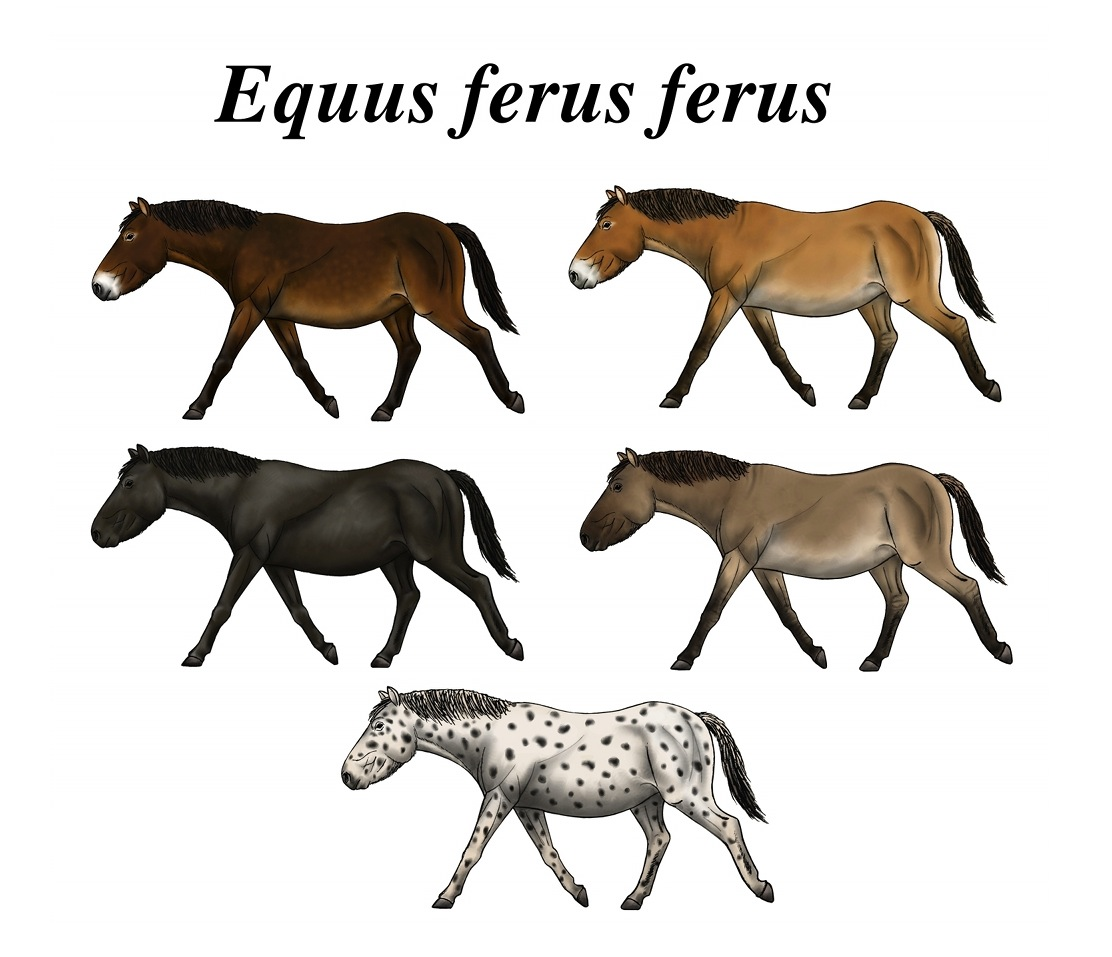
Reconstruction of the five phenotypes of Pleistocene wild horse. The coat colours and dimensions are based on genetic evidence and historic descriptions

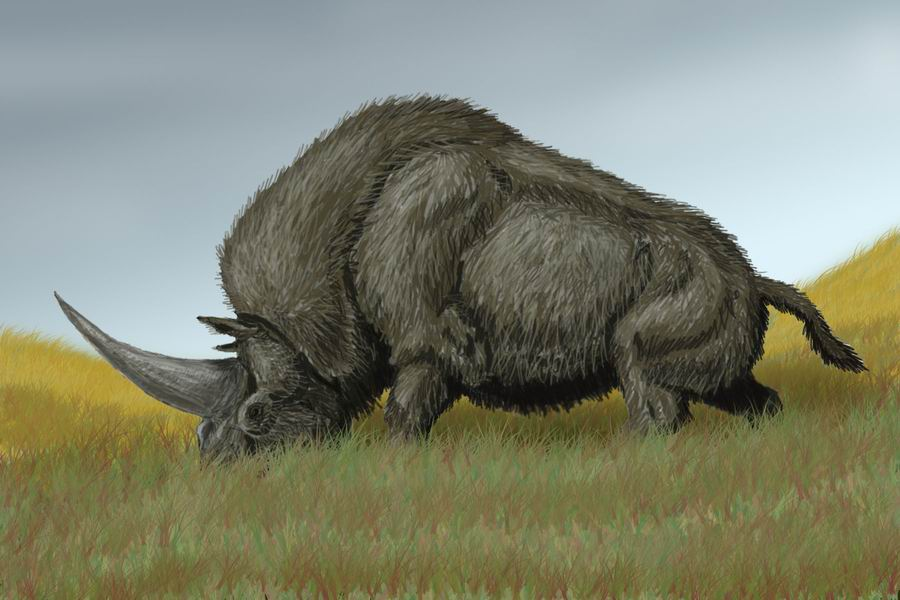
Elasmotherium sibiricum reconstruction

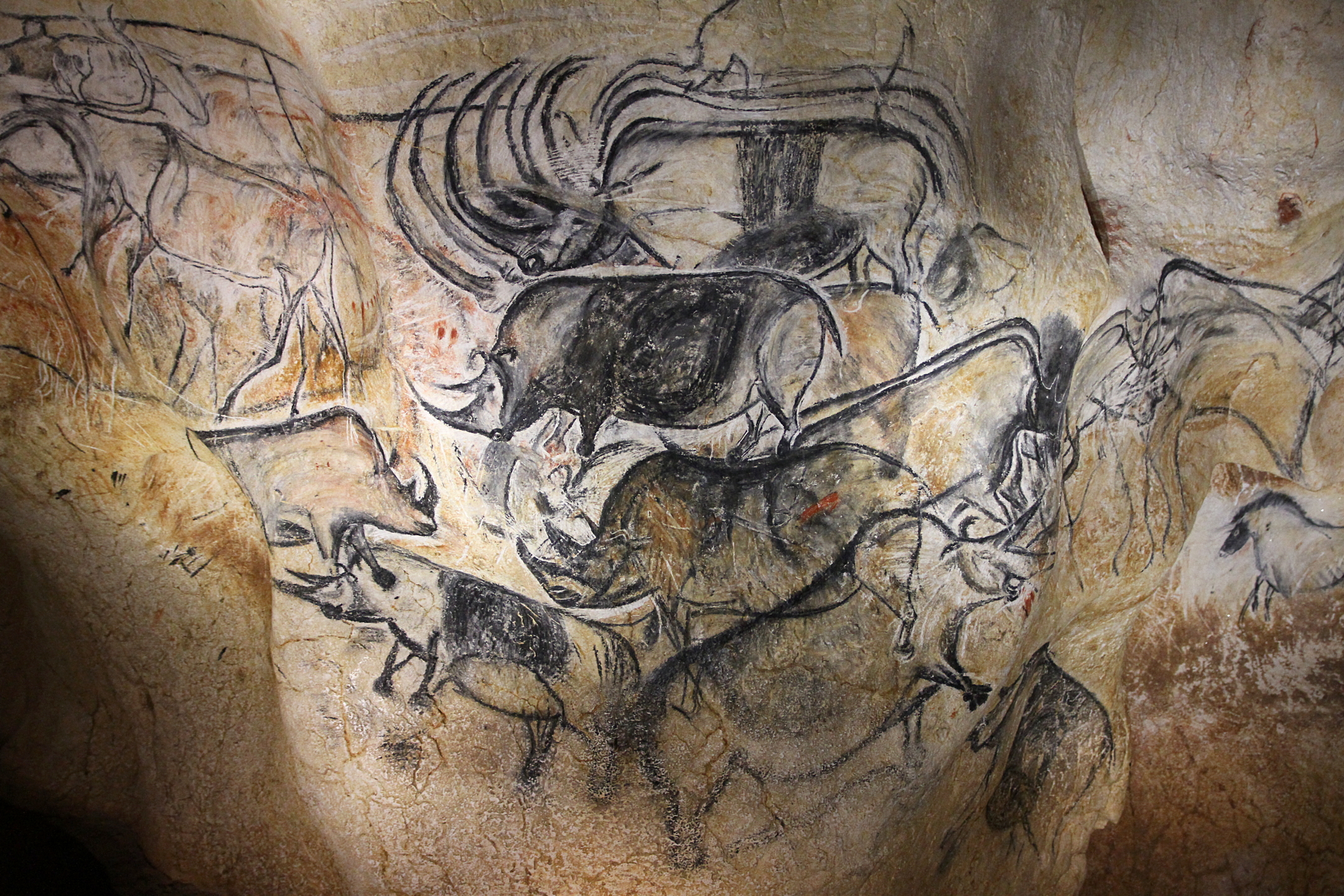
Cave paintings of the woolly rhinoceros (Coelodonta antiquitatis) in Chauvet-Pont-d'Arc Cave, France

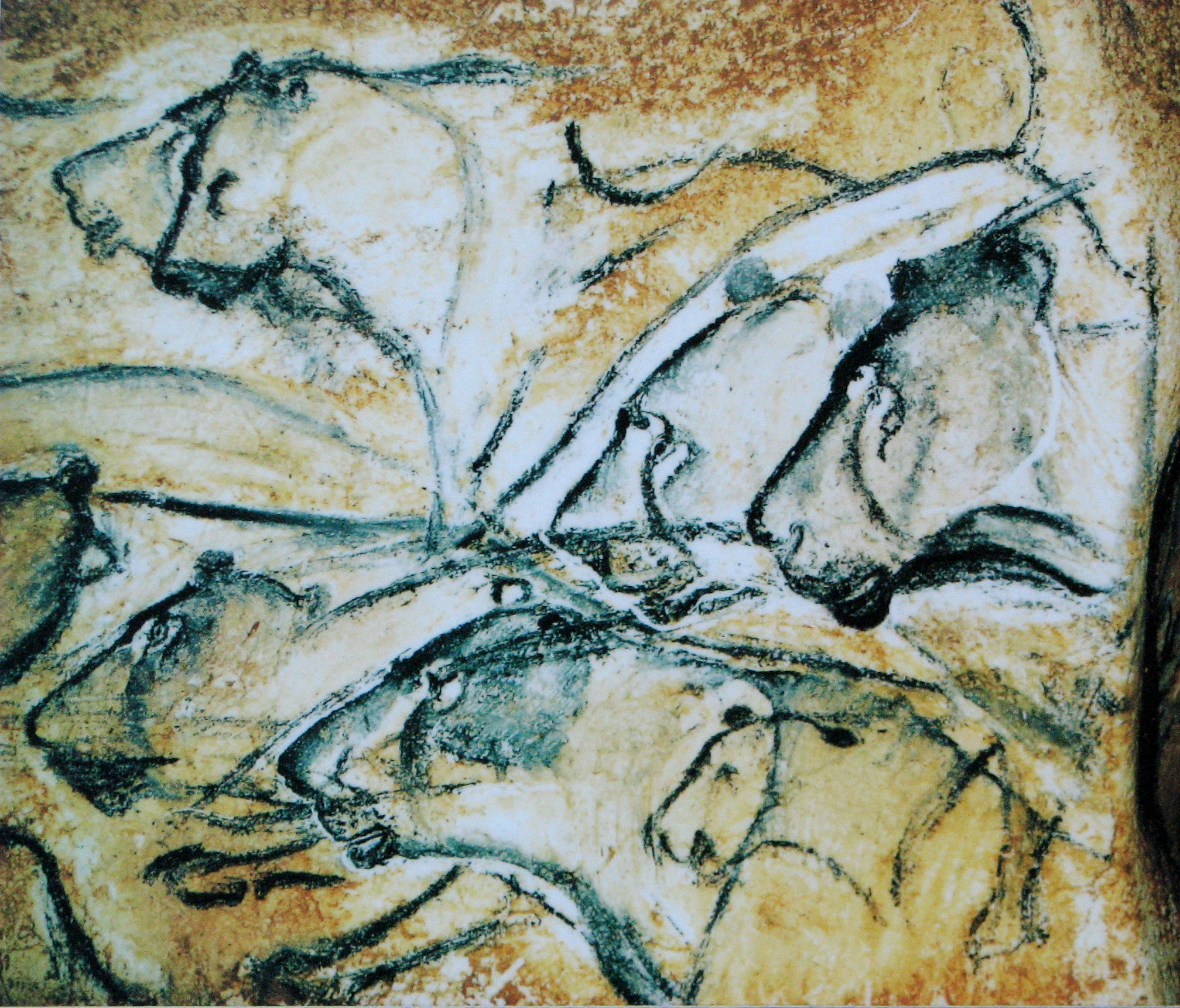
The 'Gallery of Lions', representations of the Eurasian cave lion in Chauvet-Pont-d'Arc Cave, France

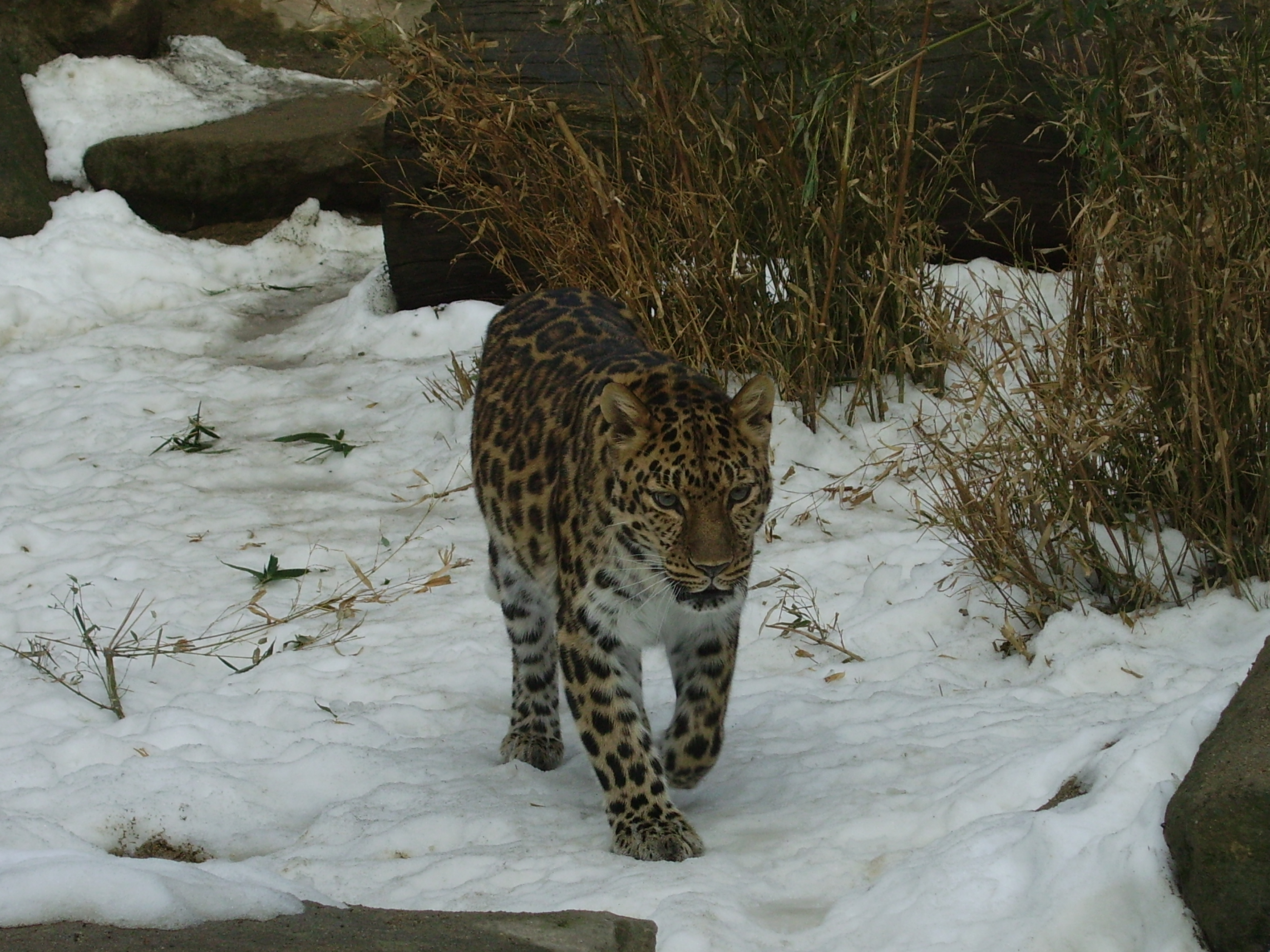
The leopard (Panthera pardus) inhabited the entire expanse of Afro-Eurasia below the 54th parallel north, from modern day Spain and the UK in the west, to South Africa in the south, and Siberia, Japan and Sundaland in the east during the Late Pleistocene

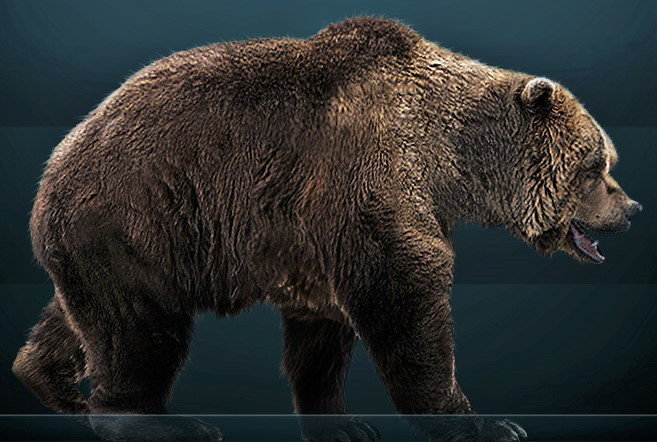
Cave bear (Ursus spelaeus) reconstruction

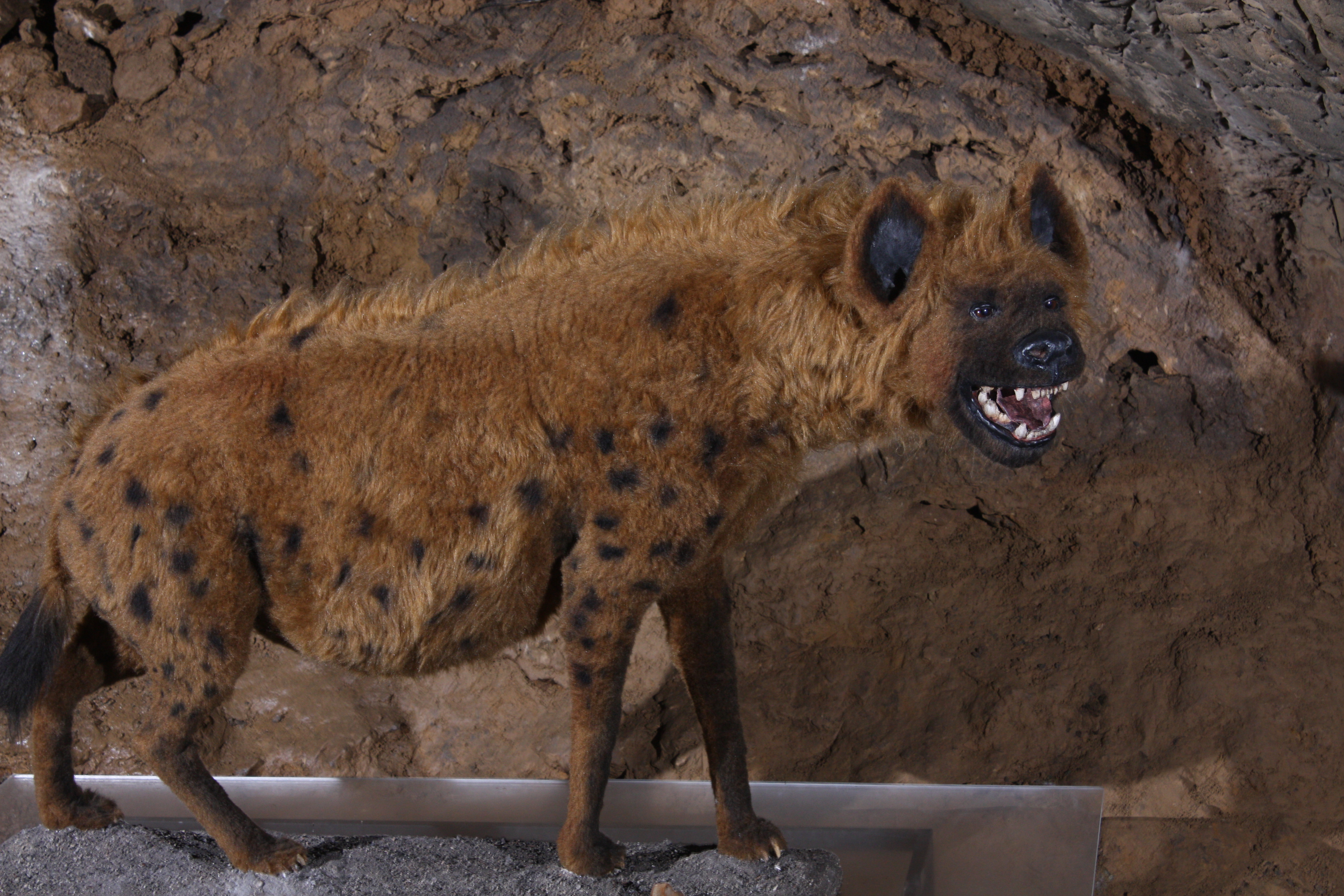
Cave hyena (Crocuta crocuta spelaea) reconstruction

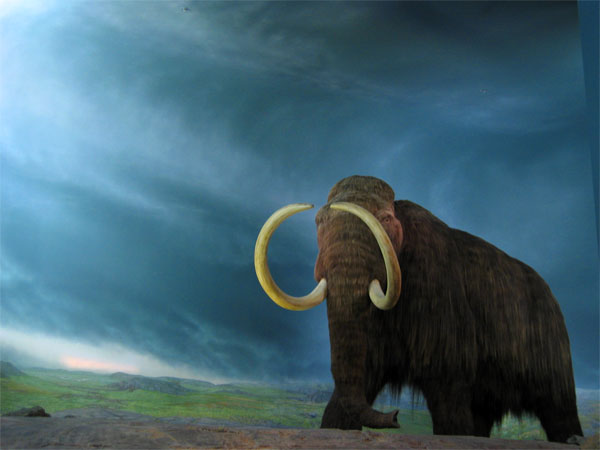
The woolly mammoth became extinct around 10,000 BCE – except for diminutive relict populations on St. Paul Island and Wrangel Island, which humans did not colonise until 3,600 BCE and 2,000 BCE respectively

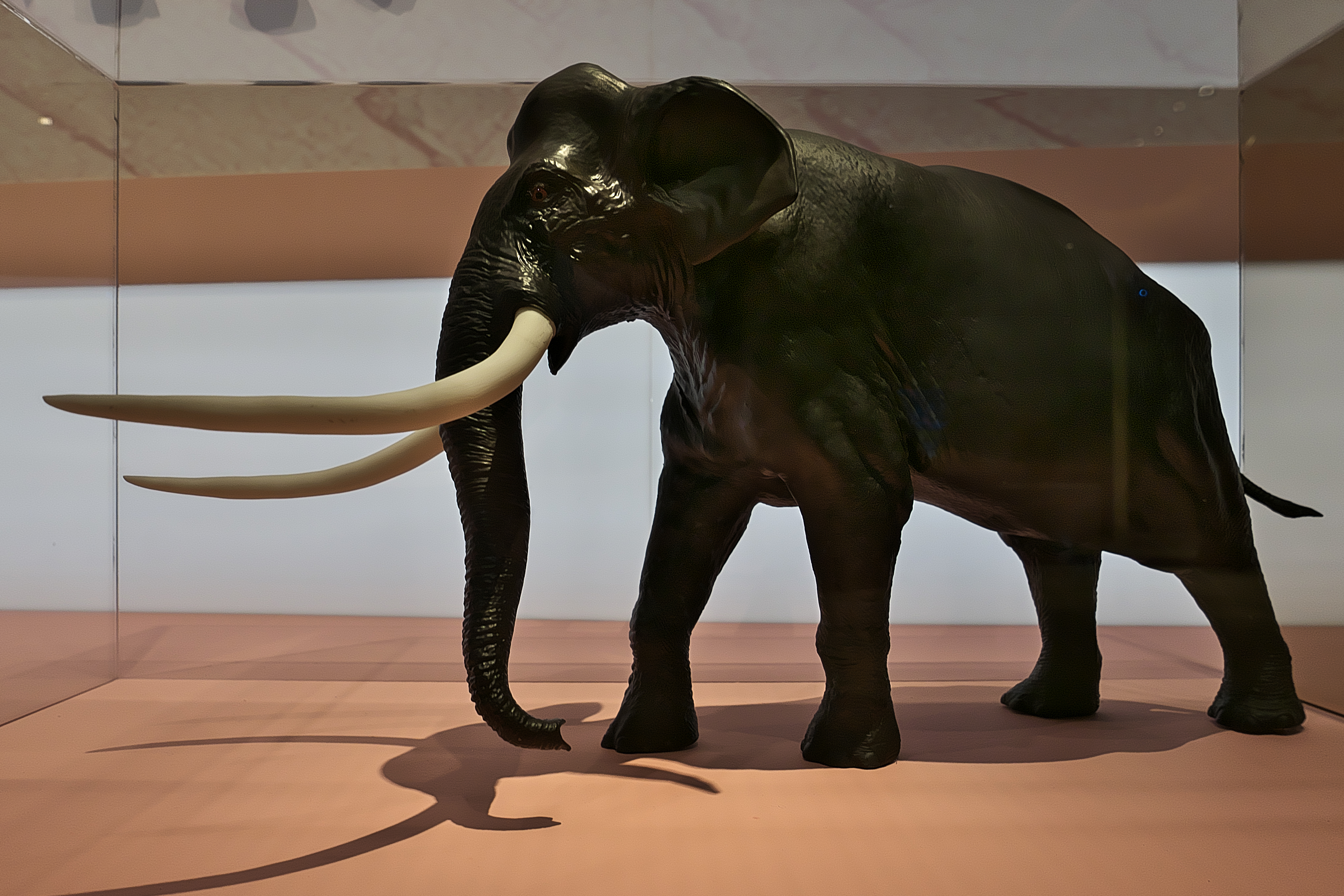
Model of the European straight-tusked elephant (Paleoloxodon antiquus)

The Palearctic realm spans the entirety of the European continent and stretches into northern Asia, through the Caucasus and central Asia to northern China, Siberia and Beringia. Extinctions were more severe in Northern Eurasia than in Africa or South and Southeast Asia. These extinctions were staggered over tens of thousands of years, spanning from around 50,000 years Before Present (BP) to around 10,000 years BP, with temperate adapted species like the straight-tusked elephant and the narrow-nosed rhinoceros generally going extinct earlier than cold adapted species like the woolly mammoth and woolly rhinoceros. Climate change has been considered a probable major factor in the extinctions, possibly in combination with human hunting.

- Ungulates
  - Even-Toed Hoofed Mammals
    - Various Bovidae spp.
      - Steppe bison (Bison priscus)
      - Baikal yak (Bos baikalensis)
      - European water buffalo (Bubalus murrensis)
      - Bubalus wansjocki (extinct buffalo native to North China)
      - Bubalus teilhardi
      - Bos sp. "Yak X" (extinct bovine closely related to yaks native to southern Siberia and Altai-Sayan region, possibly the same as Bos baikalensis)
      - European tahr (Hemitragus cedrensis)
      - Praeovibos priscus
      - Spirocerus kiakhtensis
      - Parabubalis capricornis)
    - Various deer (Cervidae) spp.
      - Irish elk/Giant deer (Megaloceros giganteus)
      - Candiacervus spp. (Crete)
      - Haploidoceros mediterraneus
      - Sinomegaceros spp. (including Sinomegaceros yabei in Japan, and Sinomegaceros ordosianus and possibly Sinomegaceros pachyosteus in China).
      - Cervus astylodon (Ryukyu Islands)
    - All native Hippopotamus spp.
      - Hippopotamus amphibius (known as the Europe European range, still extant in Africa)
      - Maltese dwarf hippopotamus (Hippopotamus melitensis)
      - Cypriot pygmy hippopotamus (Hippopotamus minor)
      - Sicilian dwarf hippopotamus (Hippopotamus pentlandi)
    - Camelus knoblochi and other Camelus spp.
  - Odd-Toed Hoofed Mammals
    - Various Equus spp. e.g.
      - Various wild horse subspecies (e.g. Equus c. gallicus, Equus c. latipes, Equus c. uralensis)
      - Equus dalianensis (wild horse species known from North China)
      - European wild ass (Equus hydruntinus) (survived in refugia in Anatolia until the Late Holocene)
      - Equus ovodovi (survived in refugia in North China until the Late Holocene)
    - All native Rhinoceros (Rhinocerotidae) spp.
      - Elasmotherium sibiricum
      - Woolly rhinoceros (Coelodonta antiquitatis)
      - Stephanorhinus spp.
        - Merck's rhinoceros (Stephanorhinus kirchbergensis)
        - Narrow-nosed rhinoceros (Stephanorhinus hemiotoechus)
- Carnivora
  - Caniformia
    - Canidae
      - Caninae
        - Wolves
          - Cave wolf (Canis lupus spelaeus)
          - Dire wolf? (Aenocyon dirus)
        - Dholes
          - European dhole (Cuon alpinus europaeus)
        - Sardinian dhole (Cynotherium sardous)
    - Arctoidea
      - Various Ursus spp.
        - Ursus kanivetz
        - Gamssulzen cave bear (Ursus ingressus)
        - Pleistocene small cave bear (Ursus rossicus)
        - Cave bear (Ursus spelaeus)
        - Ursus kudarensis
        - Ursus eremus
      - Musteloidea
        - Mustelidae
          - Several otter (Lutrinae) spp.
            - Algarolutra (Sardinia)
            - Megalenhydris (Sardinia, the largest otter ever)
            - Sardolutra (Sardinia)
            - Cretan otter (Lutrogale cretensis)
  - Feliformia
    - Various Felidae (cats) spp.
      - Homotherium latidens (sometimes called the scimitar-toothed cat)
      - Cave lynx (Lynx pardinus spelaeus), controversial validity
      - Panthera spp.
        - Cave lion (Panthera spelaea)
        - European leopard (Panthera pardus spelaea)
    - Hyaenidae (hyenas)
      - Cave hyena (Crocuta spelaea and ultima)
      - "Hyaena" prisca
- All native Elephant (Elephantidae) spp.
  - Mammoths
    - Woolly mammoth (Mammuthus primigenius)
    - Sardinian mammoth (Mammuthus lamarmorai)
  - Eurasian straight-tusked elephant (Palaeoloxodon antiquus) (Europe)
  - Palaeoloxodon huaihoensis? (China, possibly synonymous with P. antiquus)
  - Palaeoloxodon naumanni (Japan, possibly also Korea and northern China)
  - Dwarf elephant
    - Palaeoloxodon creutzburgi (Crete)
    - Cyprus dwarf elephant (Palaeoloxodon cypriotes)
    - Palaeoloxodon mnaidriensis (Sicily and Malta)
- Rodents
  - Allocricetus bursae
  - Cricetus major (alternatively Cricetus cricetus major)
  - Dicrostonyx gulielmi (ancestor to the Arctic lemming)
  - Leithia spp. (Maltese and Sicilian giant dormouse)
  - Marmota paleocaucasica
  - Microtus grafi
  - Mimomys spp.
    - M. pyrenaicus
    - M. chandolensis
  - Pliomys lenki
  - Spermophilus citelloides
  - Spermophilus severskensis
  - Spermophilus superciliosus
  - Trogontherium cuvieri (large beaver)
- Lagomorphs
  - Leporidae (hares and rabbits)
    - Lepus tanaiticus (alternatively Lepus timidus tanaiticus)
  - Pika (Ochotonidae) spp.
    - Giant pika (Ochotona whartoni)
    - Tonomochota spp.
      - T. khasanensis
      - T. sikhotana
      - T. major
- Birds
  - Yakutian goose (Anser djuktaiensis)
  - East Asian Ostrich (Pachystruthio anderssoni)
  - Various European crane spp. (Genus Grus)
    - Grus bohatshevi
    - Grus melitensis
  - Cretan owl (Athene cretensis)
- Primates
  - Cercopithecidae (Old World Monkeys)
    - Barbary macaque (Macaca sylvanus; survived until 85,000 - 40,000 years ago)
  - Homo
    - Denisovans (Homo longi)
    - Neanderthals (Homo neanderthalensis; survived until about 40,000 years ago on the Iberian peninsula)
- Reptiles
  - Solitudo sicula; survived in Sicily until about 12,500 years ago.
  - Lacerta siculimelitensis; from Malta.

=== North America ===
Extinctions in North America were concentrated at the end of the Late Pleistocene, around 13,800–11,400 years Before Present, which were coincident with the onset of the Younger Dryas cooling period, as well as the emergence of the hunter-gatherer Clovis culture. The relative importance of human and climactic factors in the North American extinctions has been the subject of significant controversy. Extinctions totalled around 35 genera. The radiocarbon record for North America south of the Alaska-Yukon region has been described as "inadequate" to construct a reliable chronology.

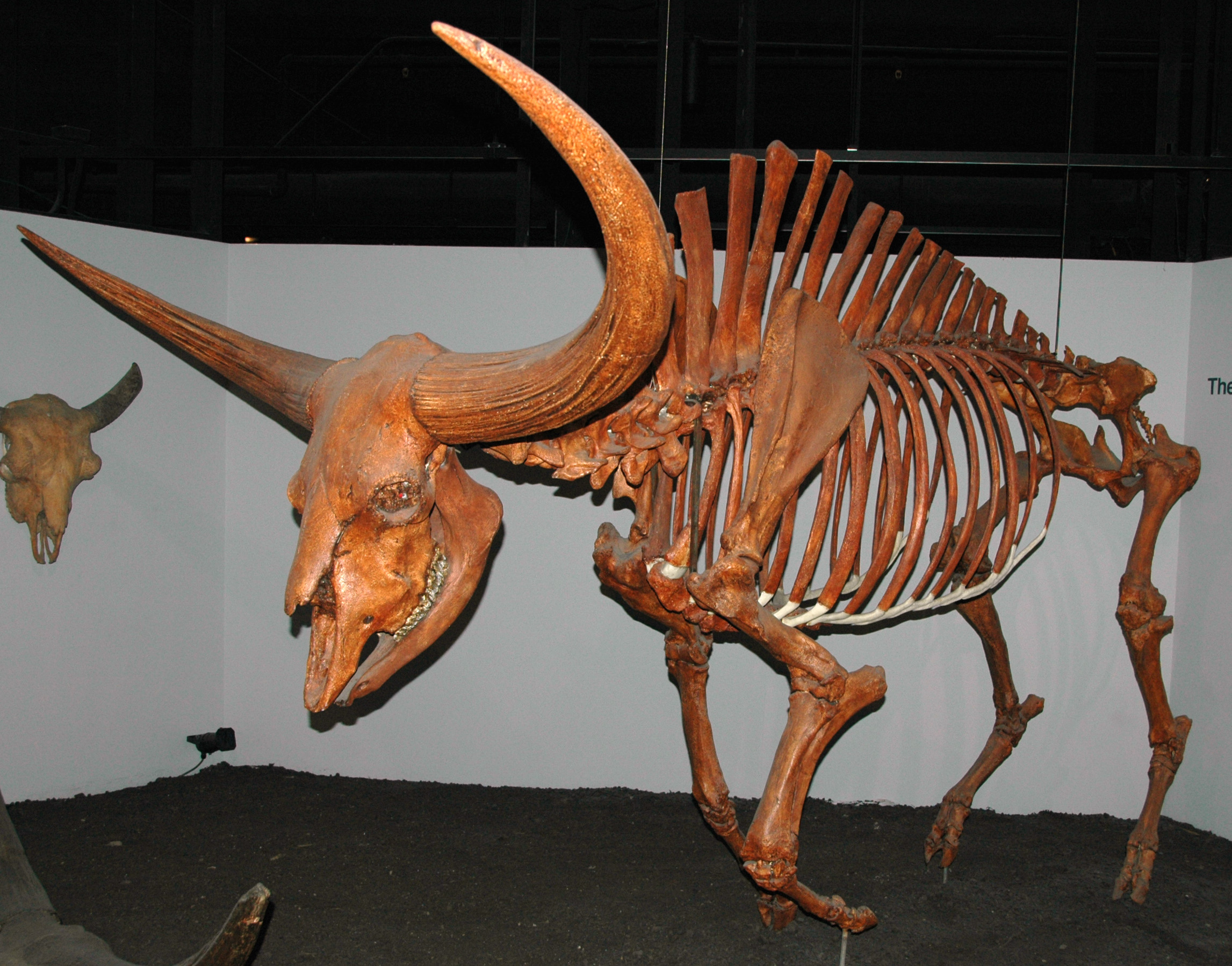
Long-horned/Giant bison (Bos latifrons), fossil bison skeleton (public display, Cincinnati Museum of Natural History & Science, Cincinnati, Ohio, United States)

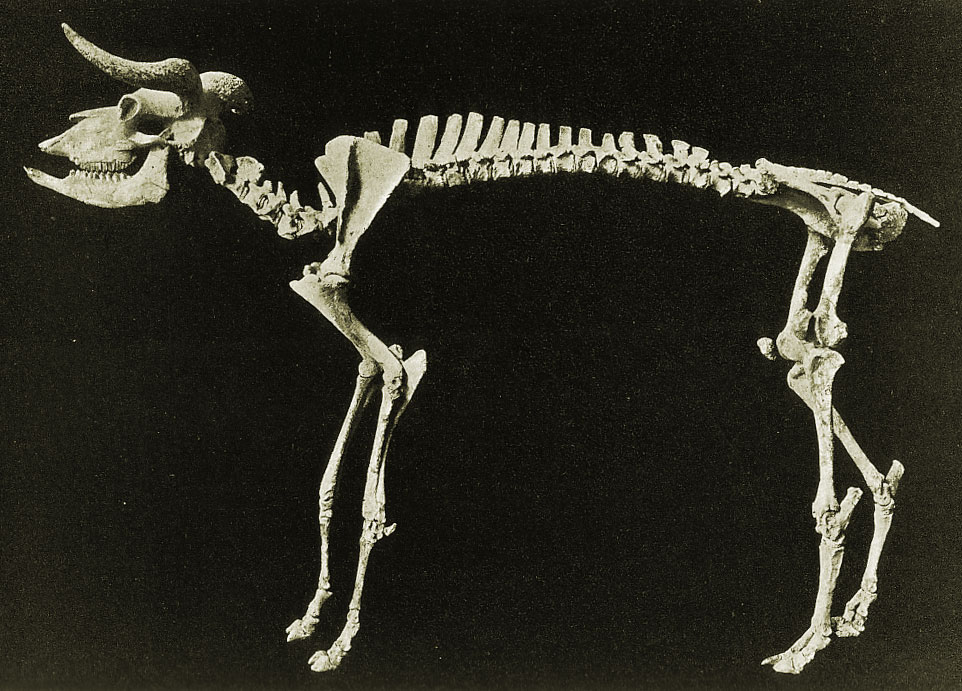
Mounted skeleton of a shrub-ox (Euceratherium collinum)

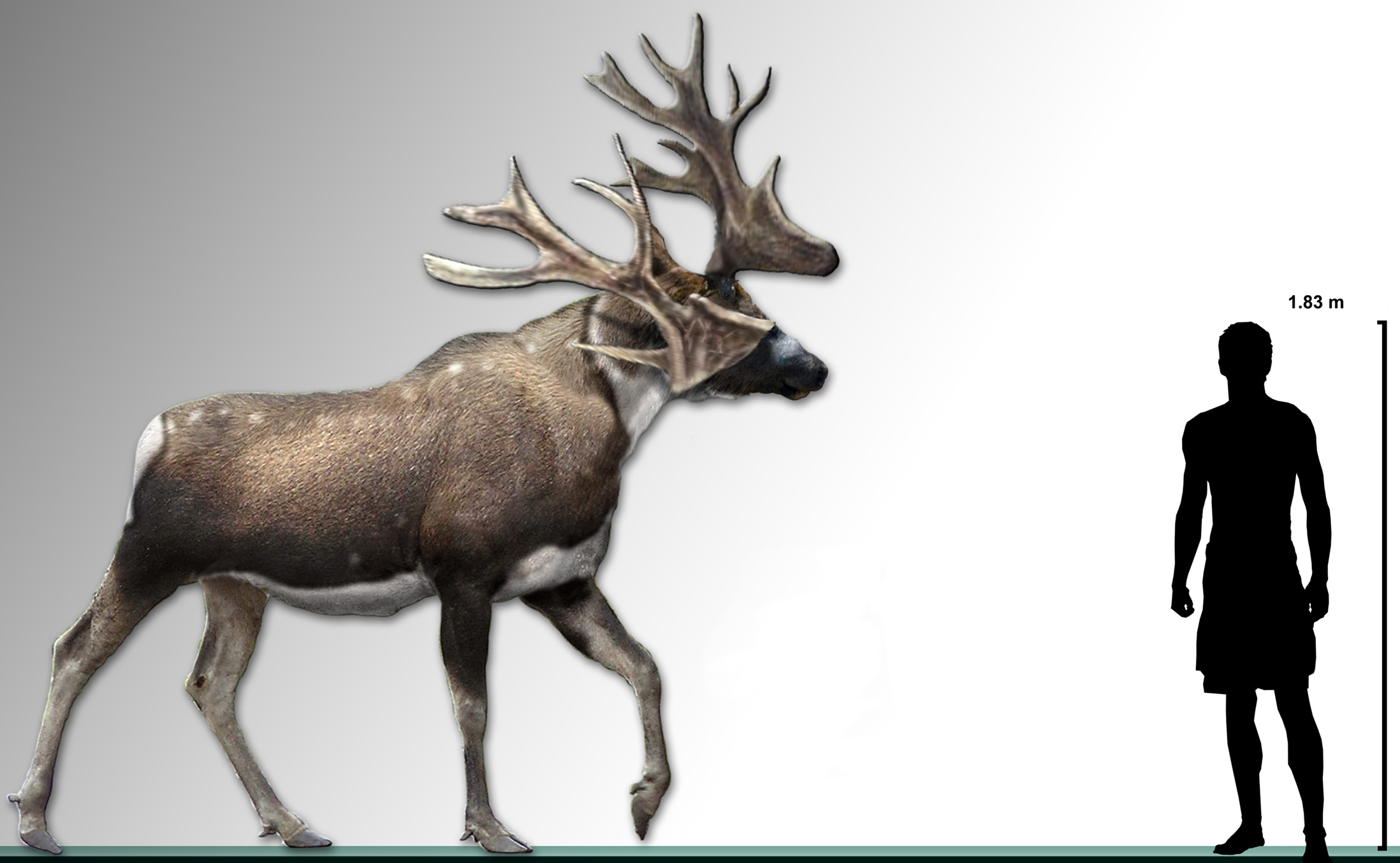
Life restoration of Stag-moose

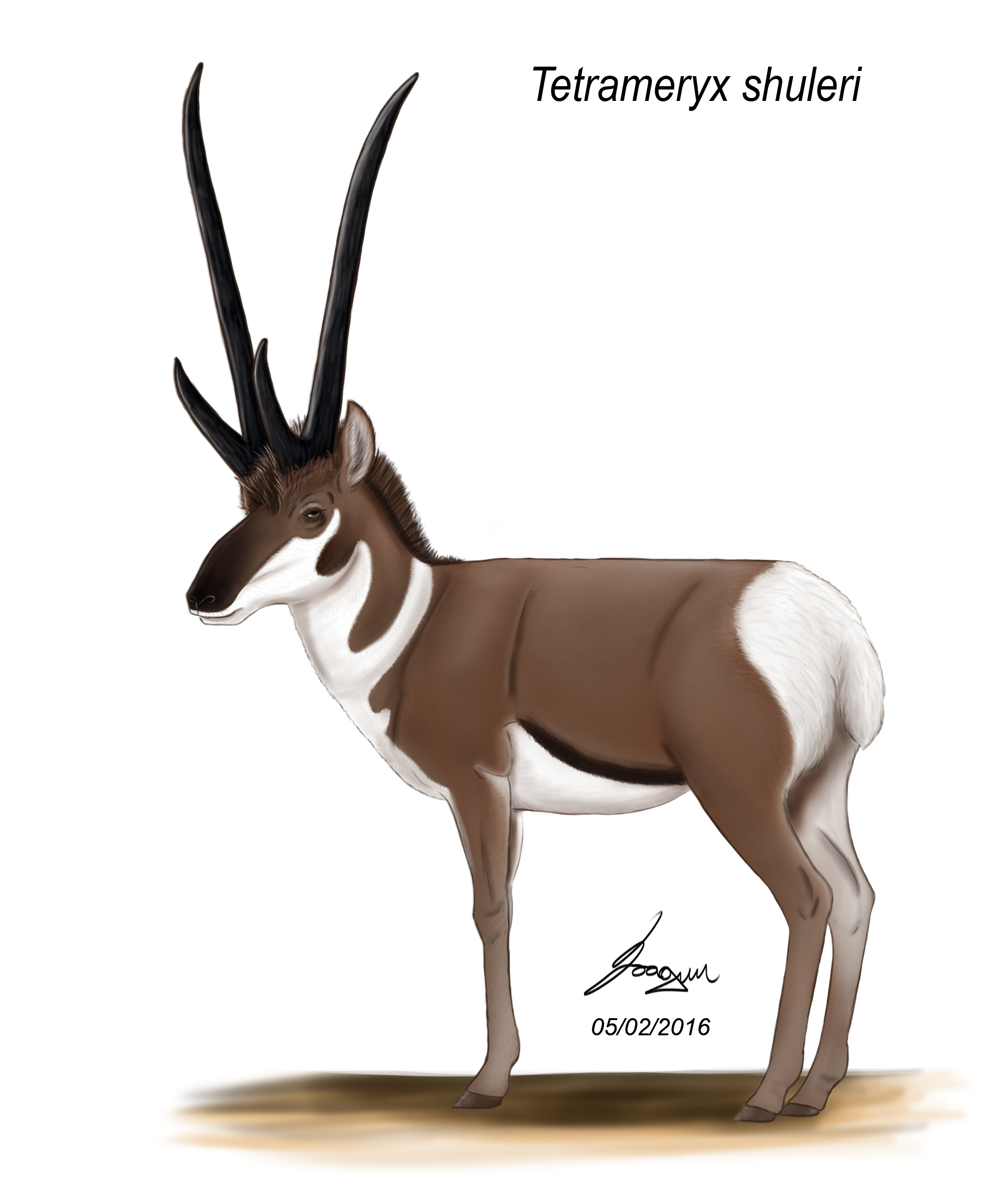
Tetrameryx shuleri restoration

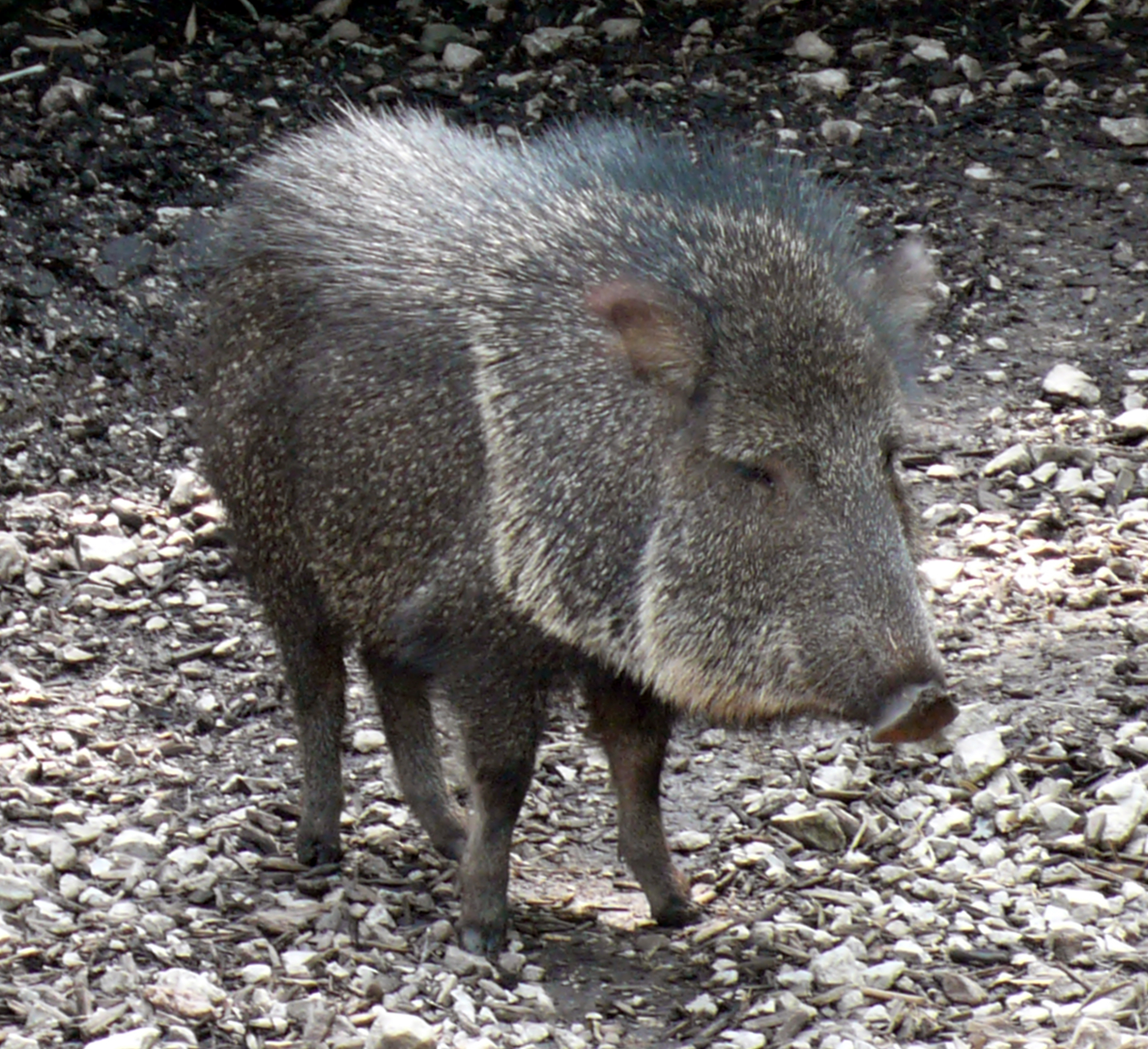
A Chacoan peccary (Catagonus wagneri), believed to be the closest surviving relative of the extinct Platygonus

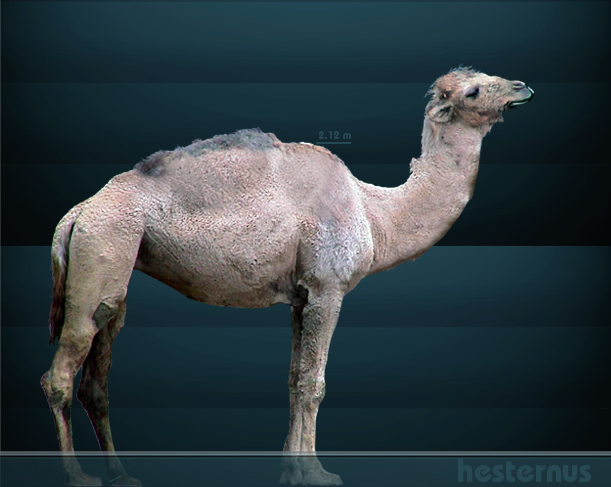
Western camel (Camelops hesternus) reconstruction

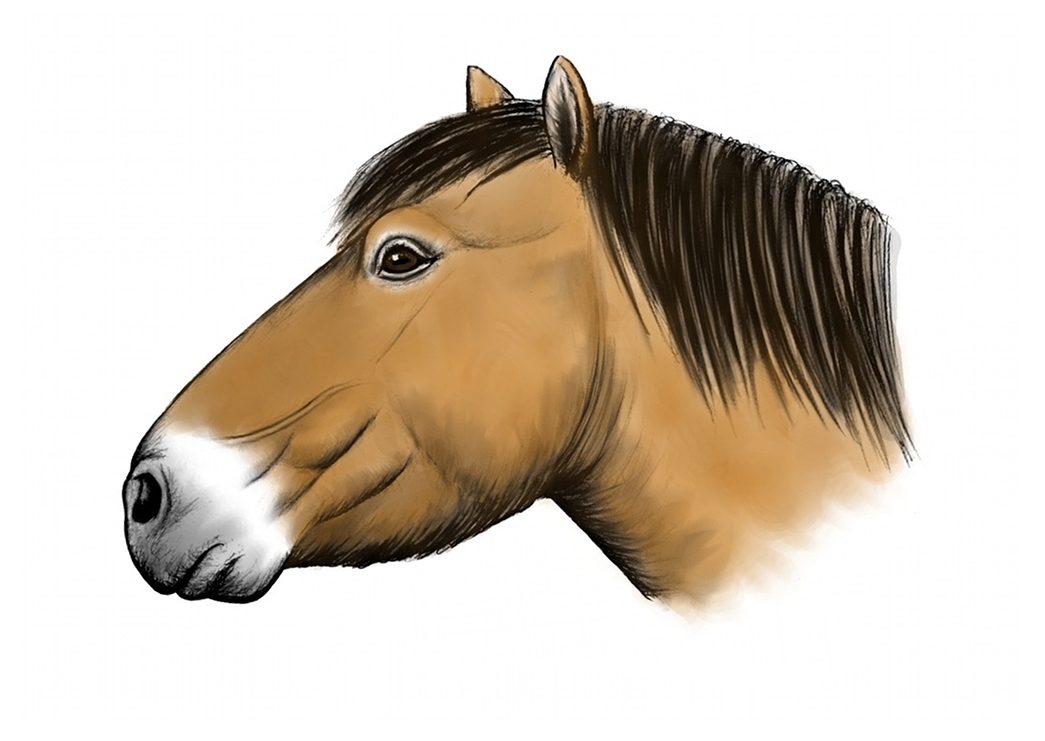
Life restoration of the Yukon horse (Equus lambei)

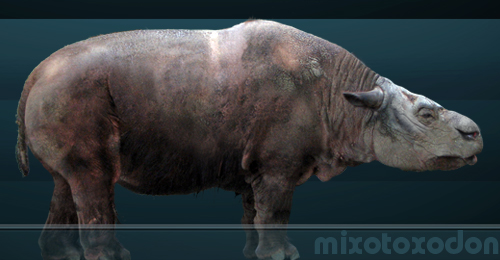
Reconstruction of Mixotoxodon larenis, a toxodontid notoungulate

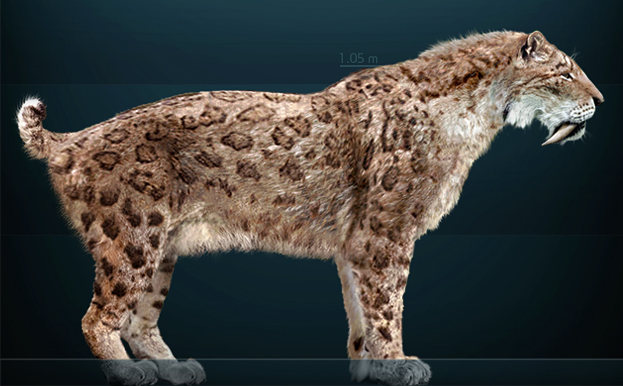
Saber-toothed cat (Smilodon fatalis) reconstruction

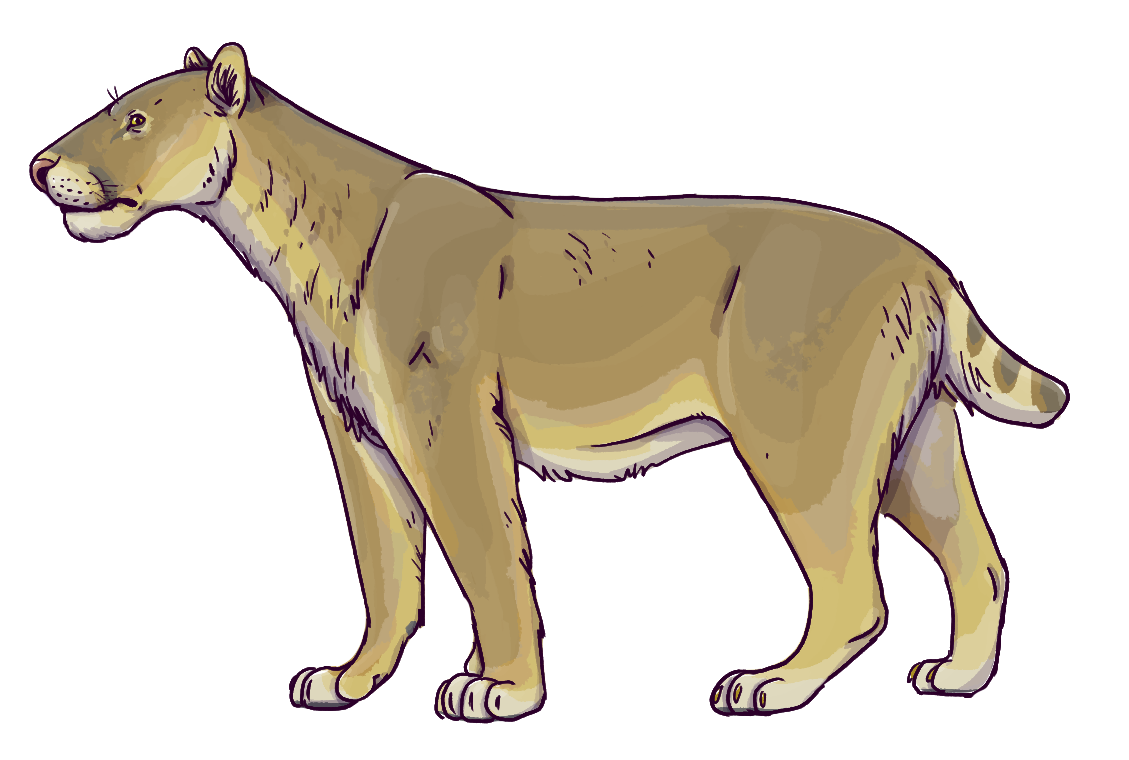
Reconstruction of the sabertooth cat Homotherium

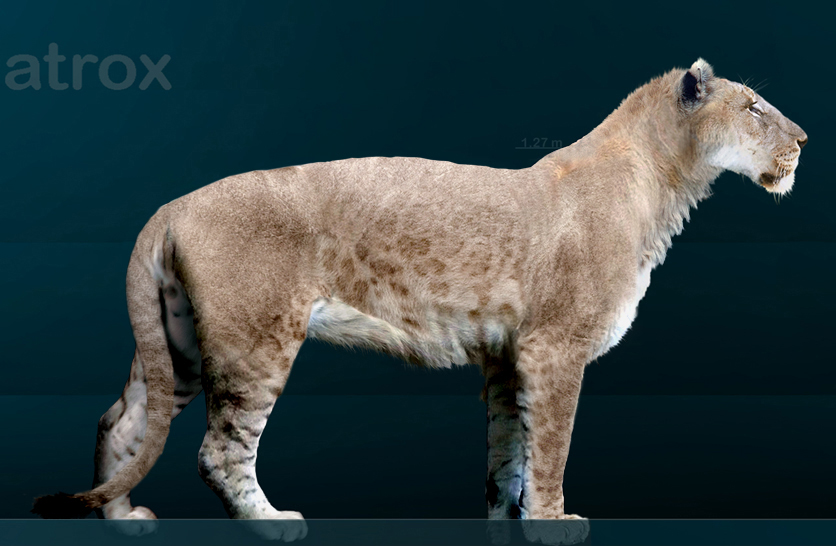
American lion (Panthera atrox) reconstruction

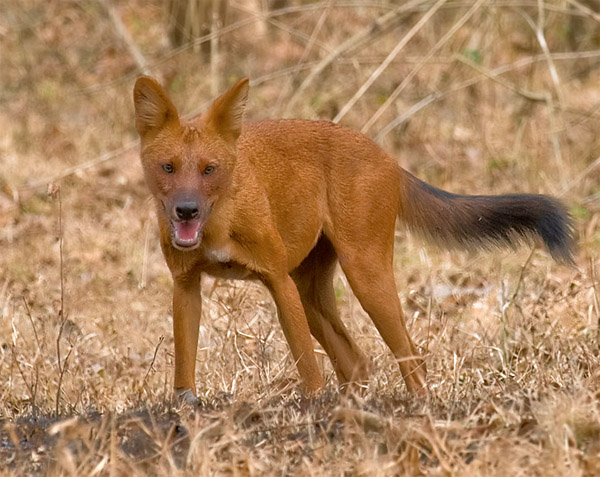
The dhole (Cuon alpinus), now restricted to the southern portions of Asia, was present from Iberia to Mexico during the Late Pleistocene

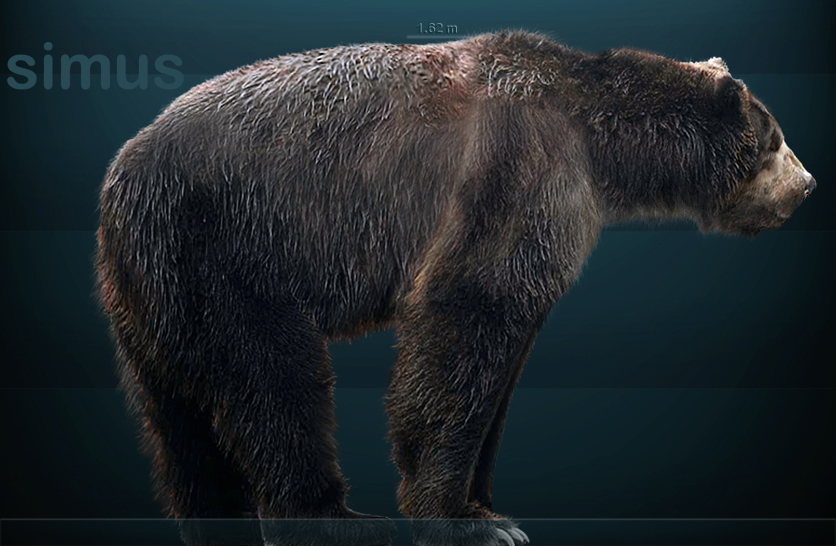
Giant short-faced bear (Arctodus simus) reconstruction

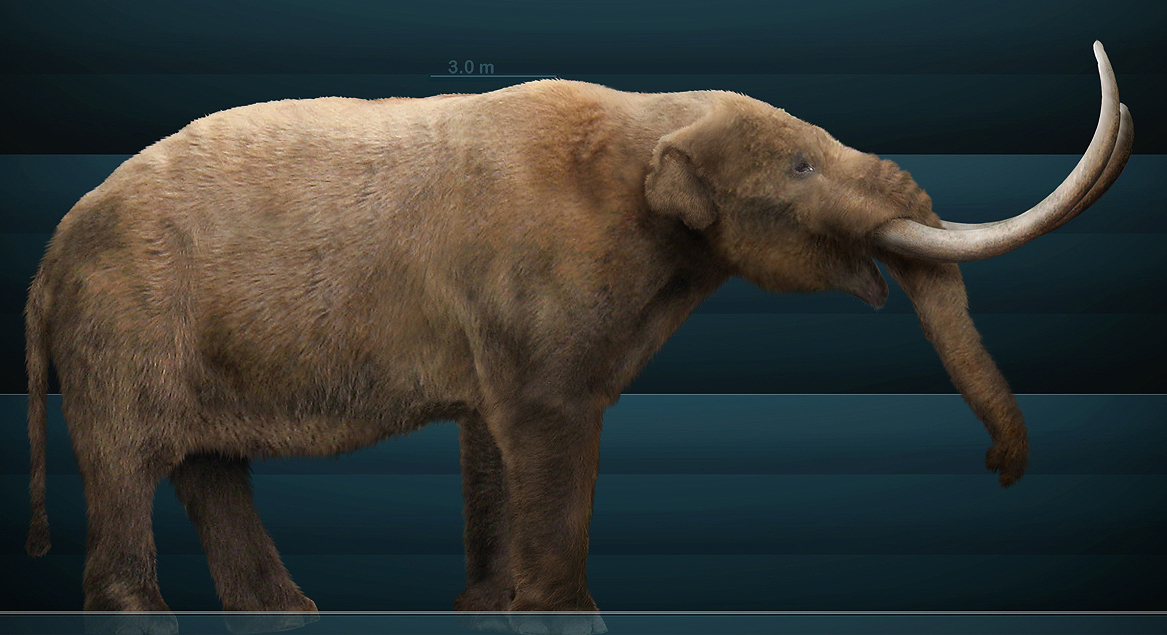
American mastodon (Mammut americanum) reconstruction

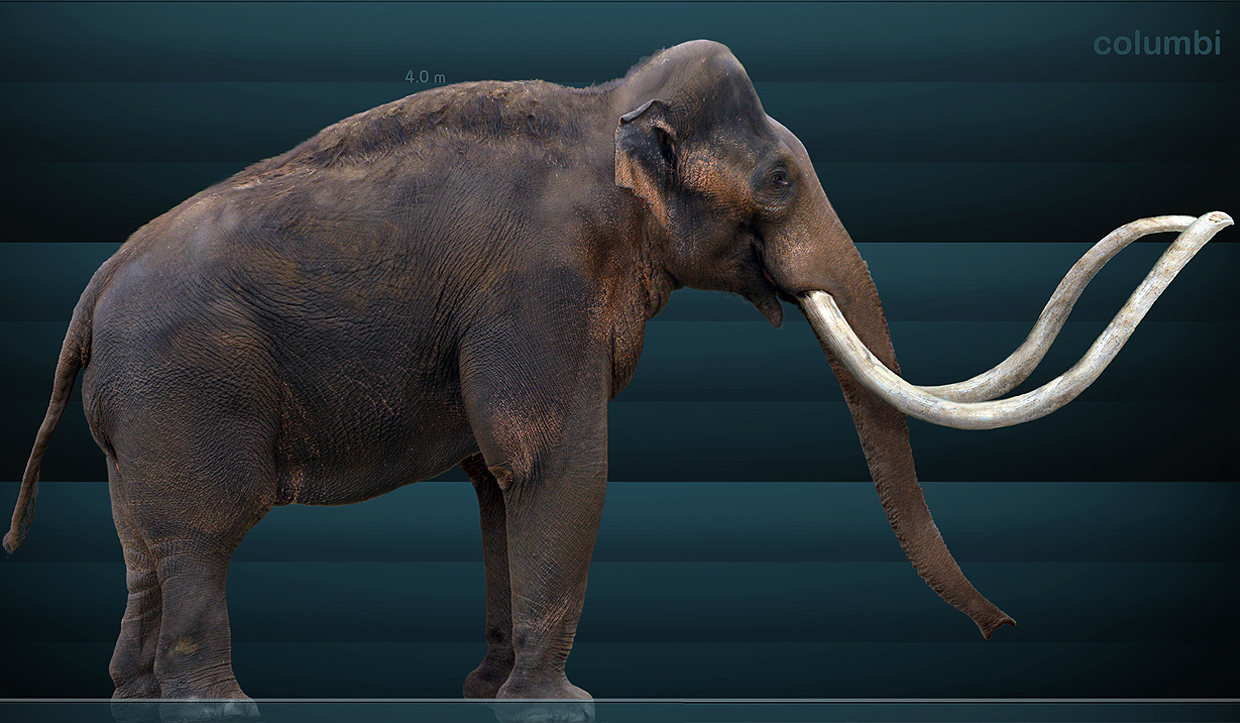
Columbian mammoth (Mammuthus columbi) reconstruction

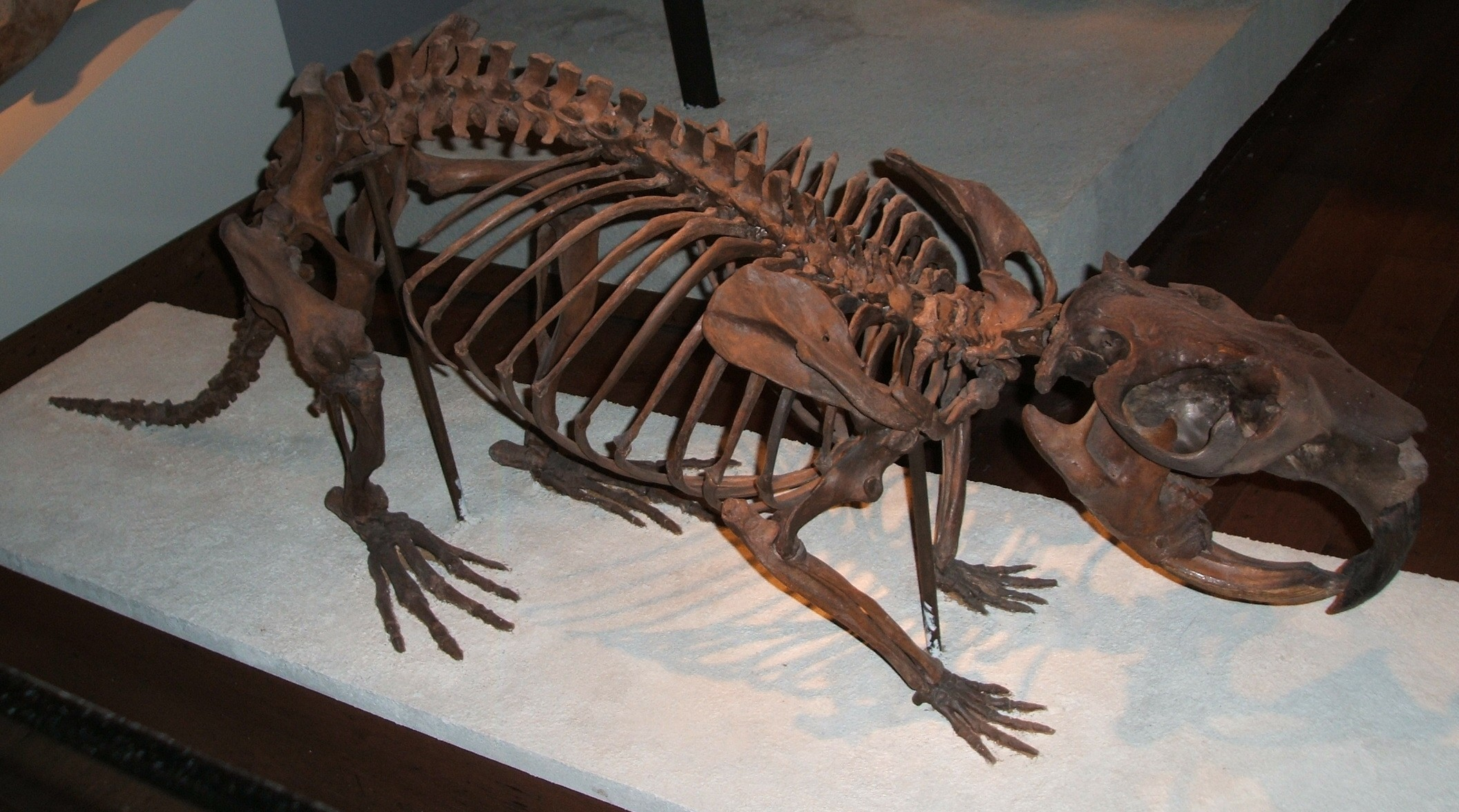
Giant beaver (Castoroides ohioensis) skeleton displayed at the Field Museum of Natural History, Chicago, Illinois, United States

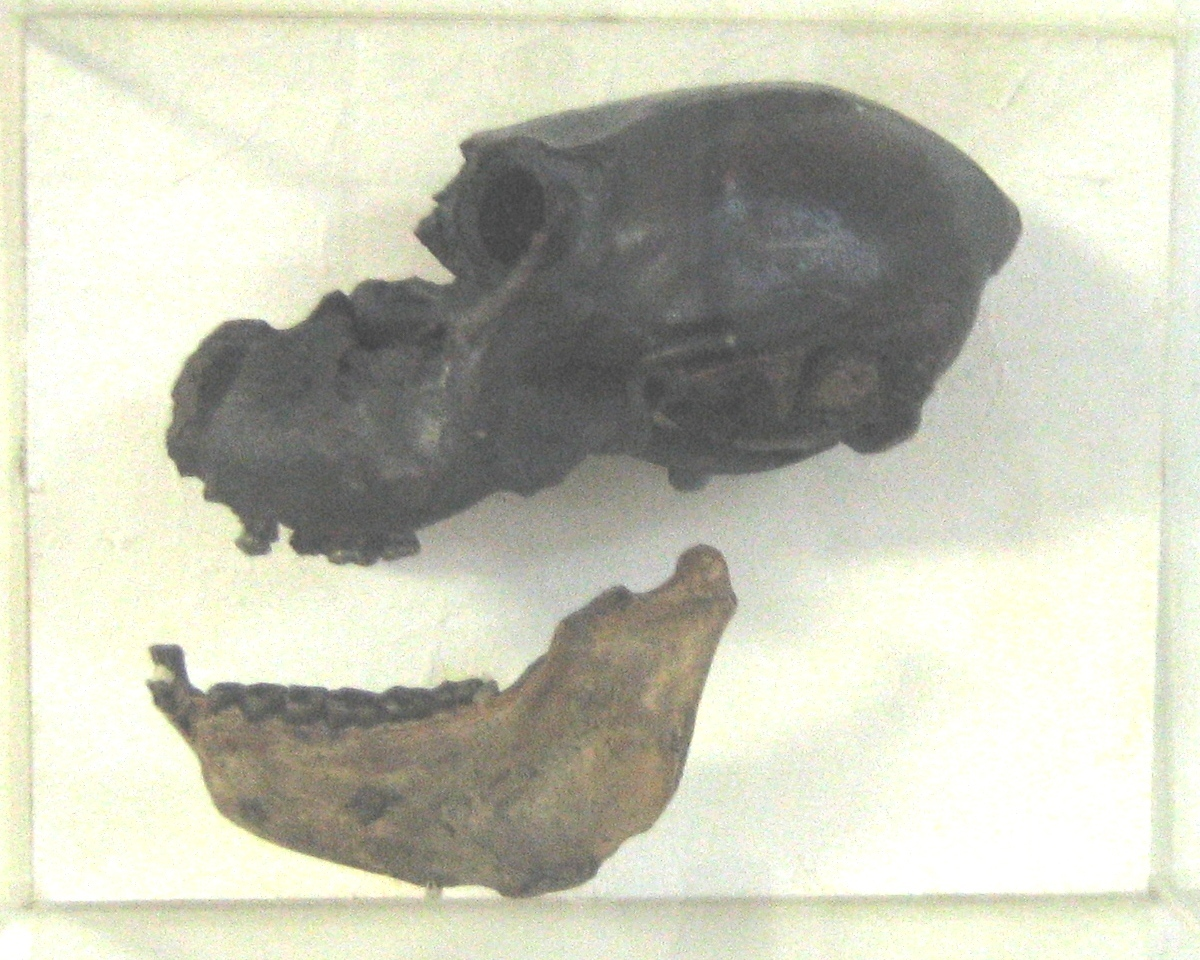
Skull of Paralouatta marianae, one of the two Cuban members of the extinct Antilles monkeys (Xenotrichini)

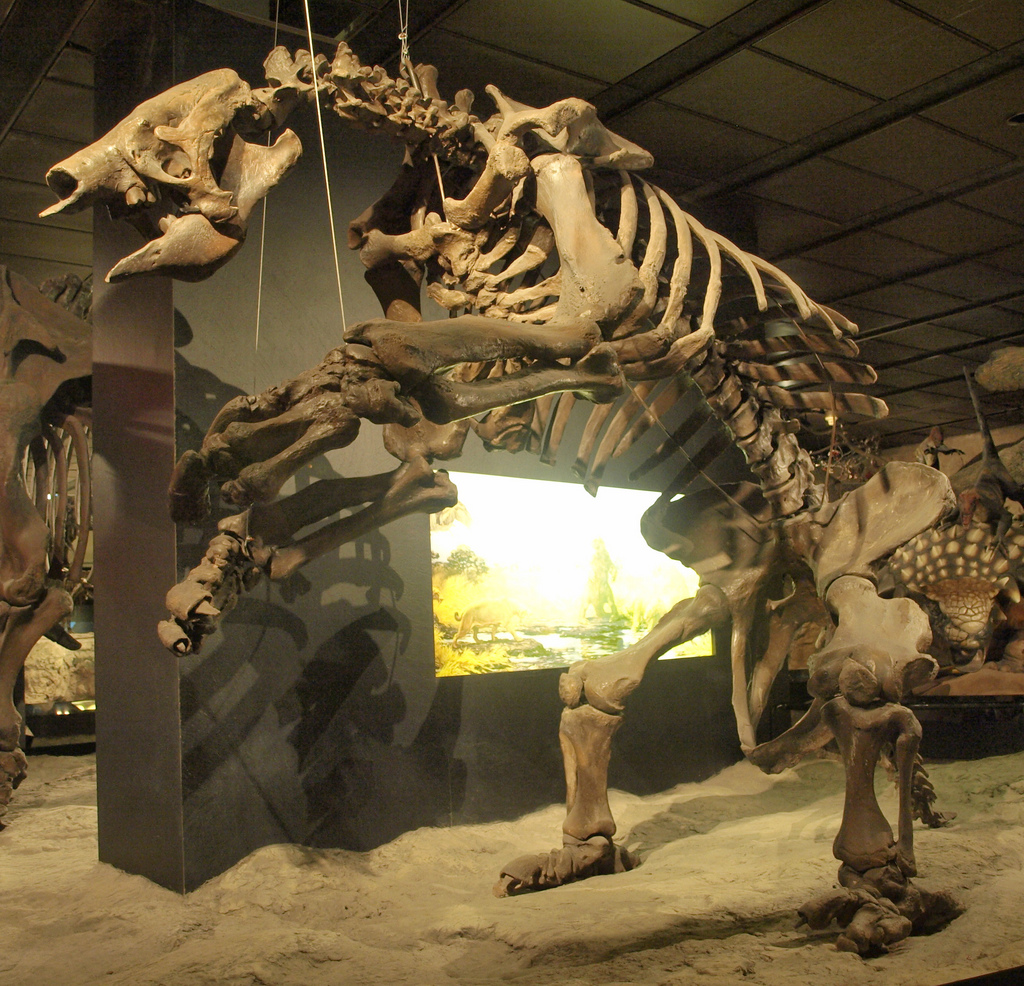
Eremotherium laurillardi skeleton displayed at the Houston Museum of Natural Science

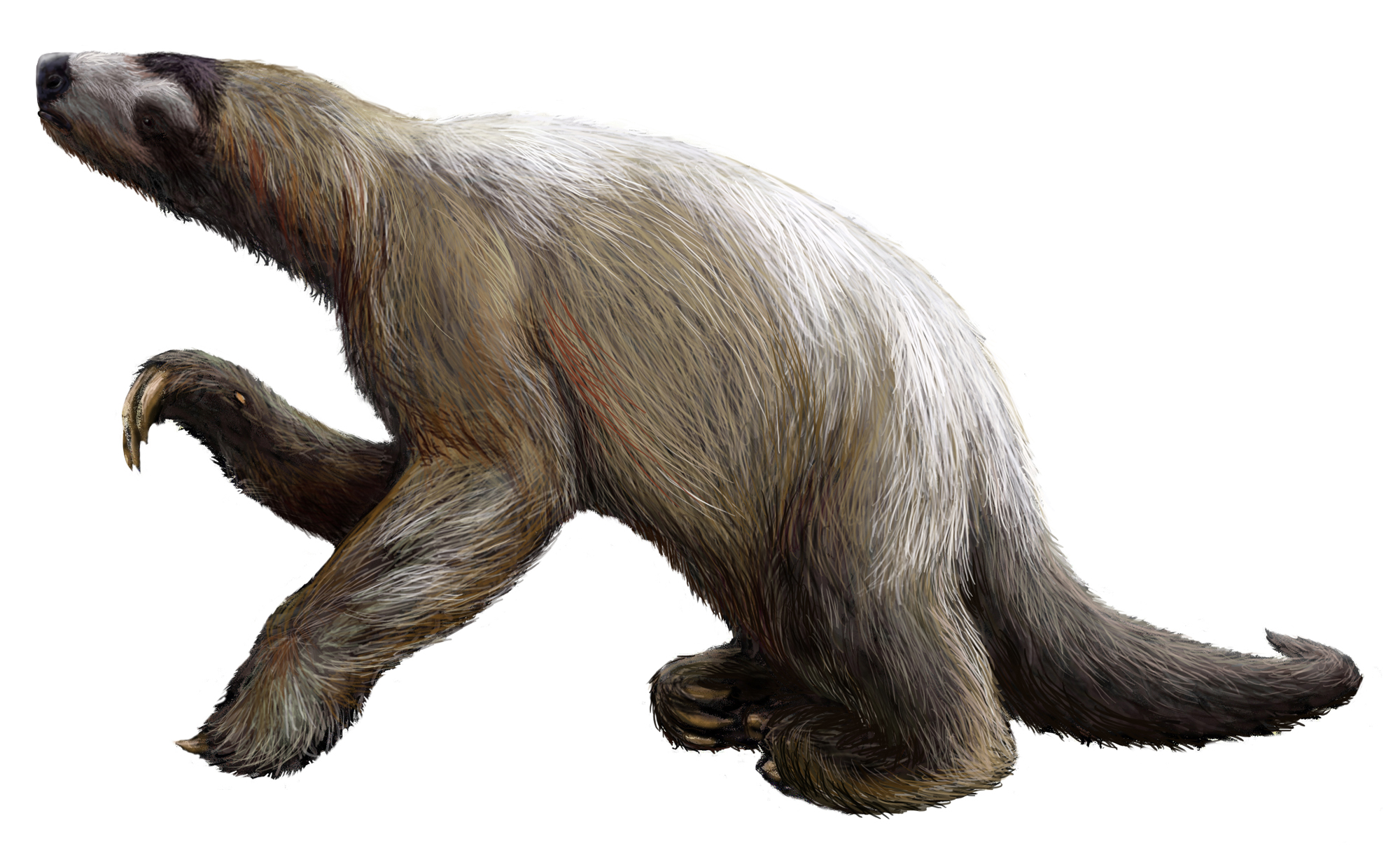
Life restoration of Nothrotheriops texanus

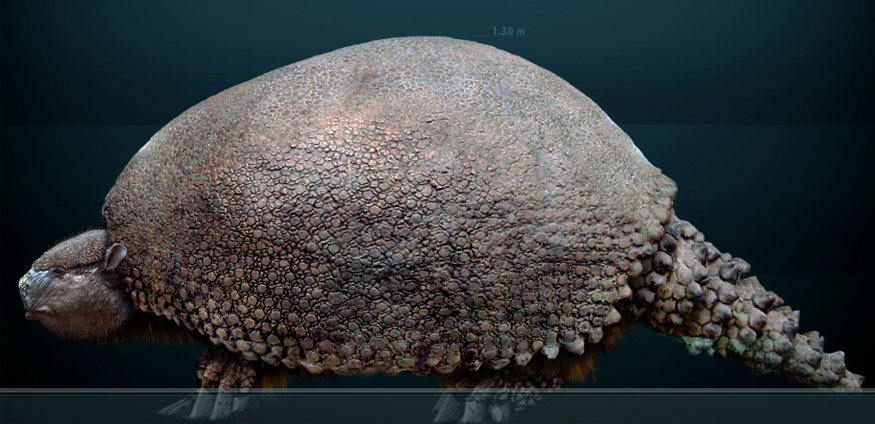
Glyptotherium reconstruction

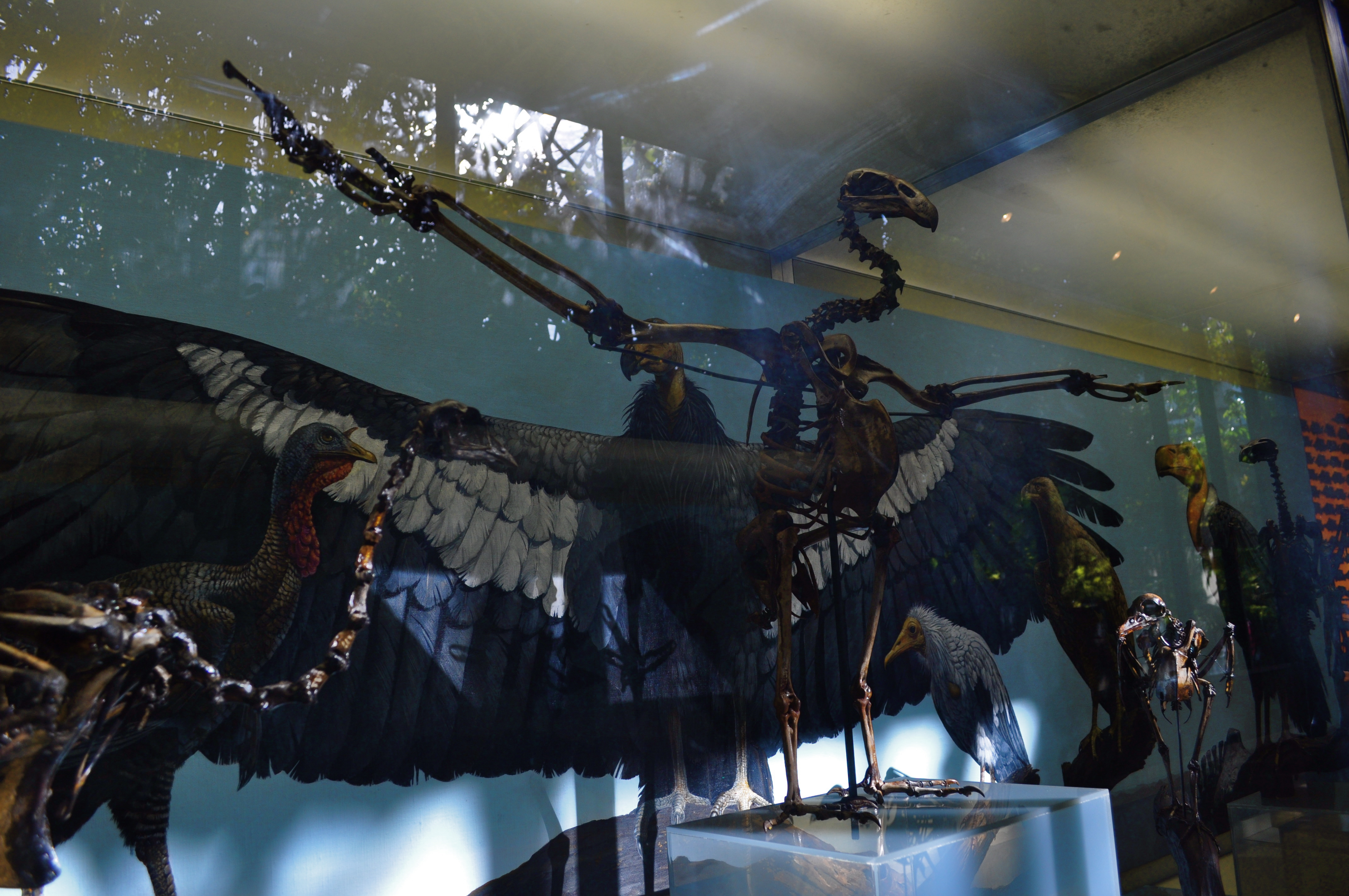
Californian turkey (Meleagris californica) and ancestral condor (Gymnogyps amplus) fossil displays at La Brea Tar Pits

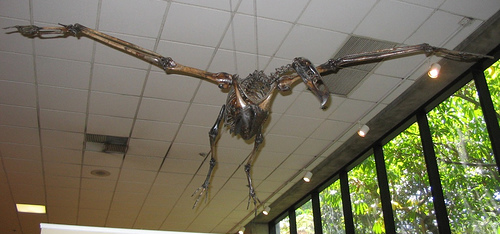
Teratornis merriami skeleton from the La Brea Tar Pits in flight pose

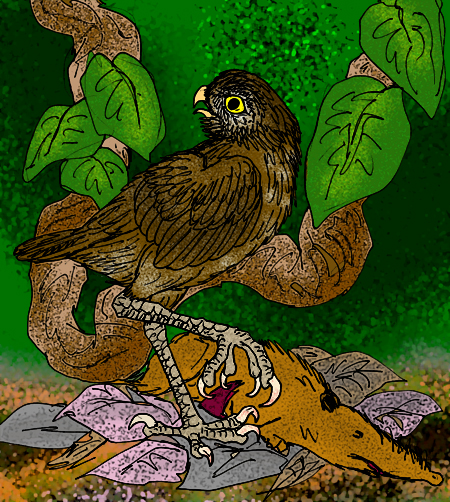
Reconstruction of the Cuban giant owl (Ornimegalonyx oteroi), of Pleistocene Cuba, with the carcass of a large solenodon

North American extinctions (noted as herbivores (H) or carnivores (C)) included:

- Ungulates
  - Even-Toed Hoofed Mammals
    - Various Bovidae spp.
      - Most forms of Pleistocene bison (only Bison bison in North America, and Bison bonasus in Eurasia, survived)
        - Bison antiquus (H)
        - Long-horned/Giant bison (Bison latifrons) (H)
        - Steppe bison (Bison priscus) (H)
      - Several members of Caprinae (the muskox survived)
        - Giant muskox (Praeovibos priscus) (H)
        - Shrub-ox (Euceratherium collinum) (H)
        - Harlan's muskox (Bootherium bombifrons) (H)
        - Soergel's ox (Soergelia mayfieldi) (H)
        - Logan's austral scrubox (Speleotherium logani) (H)
        - Harrington's mountain goat (Oreamnos harringtoni; smaller and more southern distribution than its surviving relative) (H)
      - Saiga antelope (Saiga tatarica; extirpated) (H)
    - Deer
      - Stag-moose (Cervalces scotti) (H)
      - American mountain deer (Odocoileus lucasi) (H)
      - Torontoceros hypnogeos (H) (may be a synonym of Odocoileus)
    - Various Antilocapridae genera (pronghorns survived)
      - Capromeryx (H)
      - Stockoceros (H)
      - Tetrameryx (H)
      - Pacific pronghorn (Antilocapra pacifica) (H)
    - Several peccary (Tayassuidae) spp.
      - Flat-headed peccary (Platygonus) (H)
      - Long-nosed peccary (Mylohyus) (H)
      - Collared peccary (Dicotyles tajacu; extirpated, range semi-recolonised) (H) (Muknalia minimus is a junior synonym)
    - Various members of Camelidae
      - Camelini (true camels)
        - Camelops hesternus (sometimes called yesterday's camel or western camel) (H)
      - Lamini (llamas and relatives)
        - Hemiauchenia ssp. (H)
        - Palaeolama ssp. (H)
  - Odd-Toed Hoofed Mammals
    - All native forms of Equidae
      - Caballine true horses (Equus cf. ferus) from the Late Pleistocene of North America have historically been assigned to many different species, including Equus fraternus, Equus scotti and Equus lambei, but the taxonomy of these horses is unclear, and many of these species may be synonymous with each other, perhaps only representing a single species.
      - Stilt-legged horse (Haringtonhippus francisci / Equus francisci; (H)
    - Tapirs (Tapirus; three species)
      - California tapir (Tapirus californicus) (H)
      - Merriam's tapir (Tapirus merriami) (H)
      - Vero tapir (Tapirus veroensis) (H)
  - †Order Notoungulata
    - Mixotoxodon (H)
- Carnivora
  - Feliformia
    - Several Felidae spp.
      - Saber-toothed and scimitar-toothed cats (†Machairodontinae)
        - Smilodon fatalis (saber-toothed cat) (C)
        - Homotherium serum (scimitar-toothed cat) (C)
      - American cheetah (Miracinonyx trumani; not a true cheetah)
      - Cougar (Puma concolor; megafaunal ecomorph extirpated from North America, South American populations recolonised former range) (C)
      - Jaguarundi (Herpailurus yagouaroundi; extirpated, range semi-recolonised) (C)
      - Margay (Leopardus weidii; extirpated) (C)
      - Ocelot (Leopardus pardalis; extirpated, range marginally recolonised) (C)
      - Jaguars
        - Pleistocene North American jaguar (Panthera onca augusta; range semi-recolonised by the modern jaguar (P. o. onca) (C)
        - Panthera balamoides (dubious, suggested to be a junior synonym of the short-faced bear Arctotherium)
      - Lions
        - American lion (Panthera atrox) (C)
        - Cave lion (Panthera spelaea; present only in Alaska and the Yukon) (C)
  - Caniformia
    - Canidae
      - Dire wolf (Aenocyon dirus) (C)
      - Pleistocene coyote (Canis latrans orcutti) (C)
      - Megafaunal wolf e.g.
        - Beringian wolf (Canis lupus ssp.) (C)
      - Dhole (Cuon alpinus; extirpated) (C)
      - Protocyon troglodytes (C)
    - Arctoidea
      - Musteloidea
        - Mephitidae
          - Short-faced skunk (Brachyprotoma obtusata) (C)
        - Mustelidae
          - Mustela eversmanii beringiae (subspecies of the living steppe polecat) (C)
      - Various bear (Ursidae) spp.
        - Tremarctinae (short faced bears)
          - Arctodus simus (commonly known as the giant short-faced bear) (C)
          - Tremarctos floridanus (C)
          - Arctotherium wingei (C)
        - Giant polar bear (Ursus maritimus tyrannus; a possible inhabitant) (C)
- Afrotheria
  - Paenungulata
    - Tethytheria
      - All native spp. of Proboscidea
        - Mastodons
          - American mastodon (Mammut americanum) (H)
          - Pacific mastodon (Mammut pacificus) (H) (validity uncertain)
        - Gomphotheriidae spp.
          - Cuvieronius (H)
        - Mammoth (Mammuthus) spp.
          - Columbian mammoth (Mammuthus columbi) (H)
          - Pygmy mammoth (Mammuthus exilis) (H)
          - Woolly mammoth (Mammuthus primigenius) (H)
      - Sirenia
        - Dugongidae
          - Steller's sea cow (Hydrodamalis gigas; extirpated from North America, survived in Beringia into 18th century) (H)
- Euarchontoglires
  - Bats
    - Stock's vampire bat (Desmodus stocki) (C)
    - Pristine mustached bat (Pteronotus (Phyllodia) pristinus) (C)
  - Rodents
    - Giant beaver (Castoroides) spp.
      - Castoroides ohioensis (H)
      - Castoroides leiseyorum (H)
    - Klein's porcupine (Erethizon kleini) (H)
    - Giant island deer mouse (Peromyscus nesodytes) (C)
    - Neochoerus spp. e.g.
      - Pinckney's capybara (Neochoerus pinckneyi) (H)
      - Neochoerus aesopi (H)
    - Neotoma findleyi
    - Neotoma pygmaea
    - Synaptomys australis
    - All giant hutia (Heptaxodontidae) spp.
      - Blunt-toothed giant hutia (Amblyrhiza inundata; could grow as large as an American black bear) (H)
      - Plate-toothed giant hutia (Elasmodontomys obliquus) (H)
      - Twisted-toothed mouse (Quemisia gravis) (H)
      - Osborn's key mouse (Clidomys osborn's) (H)
      - Xaymaca fulvopulvis (H)
  - Lagomorphs
    - Aztlan rabbit (Aztlanolagus sp.) (H)
    - Giant pika (Ochotona whartoni) (H)
- Eulipotyphla
  - Notiosorex dalquesti
  - Notiosorex harrisi
- Xenarthra
  - Pilosa
    - Giant anteater (Myrmecophaga tridactyla; extirpated, range partially recolonised) (C)
    - All remaining ground sloth spp.
      - Eremotherium (megatheriid giant ground sloth) (H)
      - Nothrotheriops (nothrotheriid ground sloth) (H)
      - Megalonychid ground sloth spp.
        - Megalonyx (H)
        - Nohochichak (H)
        - Xibalbaonyx (H)
        - Meizonyx
      - Mylodontid ground sloth spp.
        - Paramylodon (H)
  - Cingulata
    - All members of Glyptodontinae
      - Glyptotherium (H)
    - Beautiful armadillo (Dasypus bellus) (H)
    - Pachyarmatherium
    - All Pampatheriidae spp.
      - Holmesina (H)
      - Pampatherium (H)
- Birds
  - Water Fowl
    - Ducks
      - Bermuda flightless duck (Anas pachyscelus) (H)
      - Californian flightless sea duck (Chendytes lawi) (C)
      - Mexican stiff-tailed duck (Oxyura zapatima) (H)
    - Neochen barbadiana (H)
  - Turkey (Meleagris) spp.
    - Californian turkey (Meleagris californica) (H)
    - Meleagris crassipes (H)
  - Various Gruiformes spp.
    - All cave rail (Nesotrochis) spp. e.g.
      - Antillean cave rail (Nesotrochis debooyi) (C)
    - Barbados rail (Incertae sedis) (C)
    - Cuban flightless crane (Antigone cubensis) (H)
    - La Brea crane (Grus pagei) (H)
  - Various flamingo (Phoenicopteridae) spp.
    - Minute flamingo (Phoenicopterus minutus) (C)
    - Cope's flamingo (Phoenicopterus copei) (C)
  - Dow's puffin (Fratercula dowi) (C)
  - Pleistocene Mexican diver spp.
    - Plyolimbus baryosteus (C)
    - Podiceps spp.
      - Podiceps parvus (C)
  - Storks
    - La Brea/Asphalt stork (Ciconia maltha) (C)
    - Wetmore's stork (Mycteria wetmorei) (C)
  - Pleistocene Mexican cormorants spp. (genus Phalacrocorax)
    - Phalacrocorax goletensis (C)
    - Phalacrocorax chapalensis (C)
  - All remaining teratorn (Teratornithidae) spp.
    - Aiolornis incredibilis (C)
    - Cathartornis gracilis (C)
    - Oscaravis olsoni (C)
    - Teratornis merriami (C)
    - Teratornis woodburnensis (C)
  - Several New World vultures (Cathartidae) spp.
    - Pleistocene black vulture (Coragyps occidentalis ssp.) (C)
    - Ancestral condor (Gymnogyps amplus) (C)
    - Clark's condor (Breagyps clarki) (C)
    - Cuban condor (Gymnogyps varonai) (C)
  - Several Accipitridae spp.
    - Gypaetinae (Old World vultures)
      - Neophrontops americanus (C)
      - Neogyps errans (C)
    - Buteogallus (black hawks)
      - Buteogallus woodwardi) (C)
      - Buteogallus borrasi) (C)
      - Buteogallus daggetti (C)
      - Buteogallus fragilis (C)
    - Gigantohierax suarezi (C)
    - Spizaetus (hawk eagles)
      - Spizaetus grinnelli) (C)
      - Spizaetus willetti) (C)
    - Titanohierax (C)
  - Several owl (Strigiformes) spp.
    - Asphaltoglaux) (C)
    - Glaucidium kurochkini) (C)
    - Oraristix brea) (C)
    - Ornimegalonyx (a very large owl native to Cuba) (C)
  - Bermuda flicker (Colaptes oceanicus) (C)
  - Several caracara (Caracarinae) spp.
    - Bahaman caracara (Caracara sp.) (C)
    - Puerto Rican caracara (Caracara sp.) (C)
    - Jamaican caracara (Carcara tellustris) (C)
    - Cuban caracara (Daptrius sp.) (C)
    - Hispaniolan caracara (Daptrius sp.) (C)
  - Psittacopasserae
    - Psittaciformes (parrots)
      - Rhynchopsitta phillipsi) (H)
- Several giant tortoise spp.
  - Hesperotestudo (H)
  - Gopherus spp.
    - Gopherus donlaloi (H)
  - Chelonoidis spp.
    - Chelonoidis marcanoi (H)
    - Chelonoidis alburyorum (H)

The survivors are in some ways as significant as the losses: bison (H), gray wolf (C), lynx (C), grizzly bear (C), American black bear (C), deer (e.g., caribou, moose, wapiti (elk), Odocoileus spp.) (H), pronghorn (H), white-lipped peccary (H), muskox (H), bighorn sheep (H), and mountain goat (H); the list of survivors also include species which were extirpated during the Quaternary extinction event, but recolonised at least part of their ranges during the Middle Holocene from South American relict populations, such as the cougar (C), jaguar (C), giant anteater (C), collared peccary (H), ocelot (C) and jaguarundi (C). All save the pronghorns and giant anteaters were descended from Asian ancestors that had evolved with human predators. Pronghorns are the second-fastest land mammal (after the cheetah), which may have helped them elude hunters. More difficult to explain in the context of overkill is the survival of bison, since these animals first appeared in North America less than 240,000 years ago and so were geographically removed from human predators for a sizeable period of time. Because ancient bison evolved into living bison, there was no continent-wide extinction of bison at the end of the Pleistocene (although the genus was regionally extirpated in many areas). The survival of bison into the Holocene and recent times is therefore inconsistent with the overkill scenario. By the end of the Pleistocene, when humans first entered North America, these large animals had been geographically separated from intensive human hunting for more than 200,000 years. Given this enormous span of geologic time, bison would almost certainly have been very nearly as naive as native North American large mammals.

The culture that has been connected with the wave of extinctions in North America is the paleo-American culture associated with the Clovis people (q.v.), who were thought to use spear throwers to kill large animals. The chief criticism of the "prehistoric overkill hypothesis" has been that the human population at the time was too small and/or not sufficiently widespread geographically to have been capable of such ecologically significant impacts. This criticism does not mean that climate change scenarios explaining the extinction are automatically to be preferred by default, however, any more than weaknesses in climate change arguments can be taken as supporting overkill. Some form of a combination of both factors could be plausible, and overkill would be a lot easier to achieve large-scale extinction with an already stressed population due to climate change.

=== South America ===
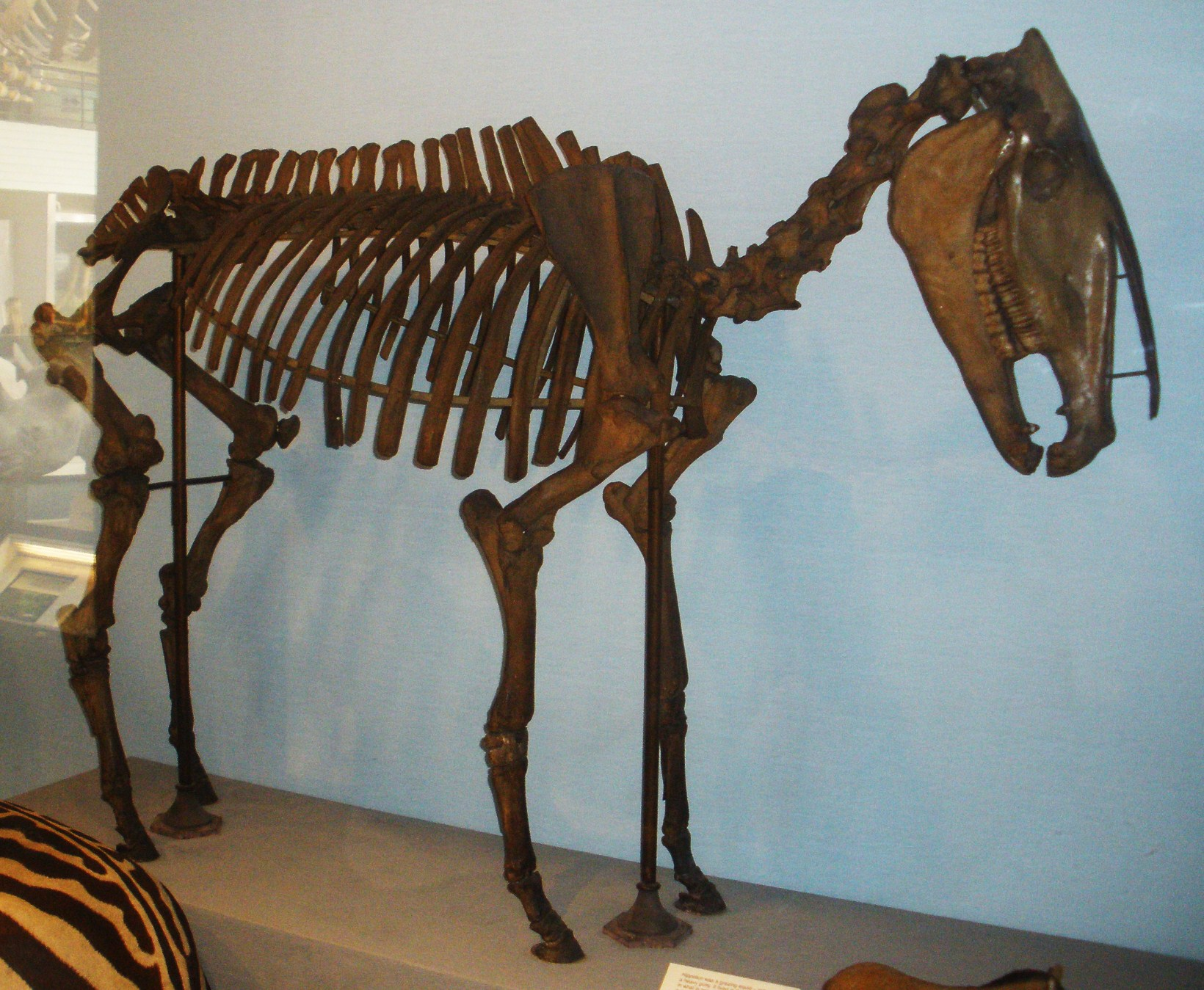
Fossil of Hippidion, a genus of horse native to South America.

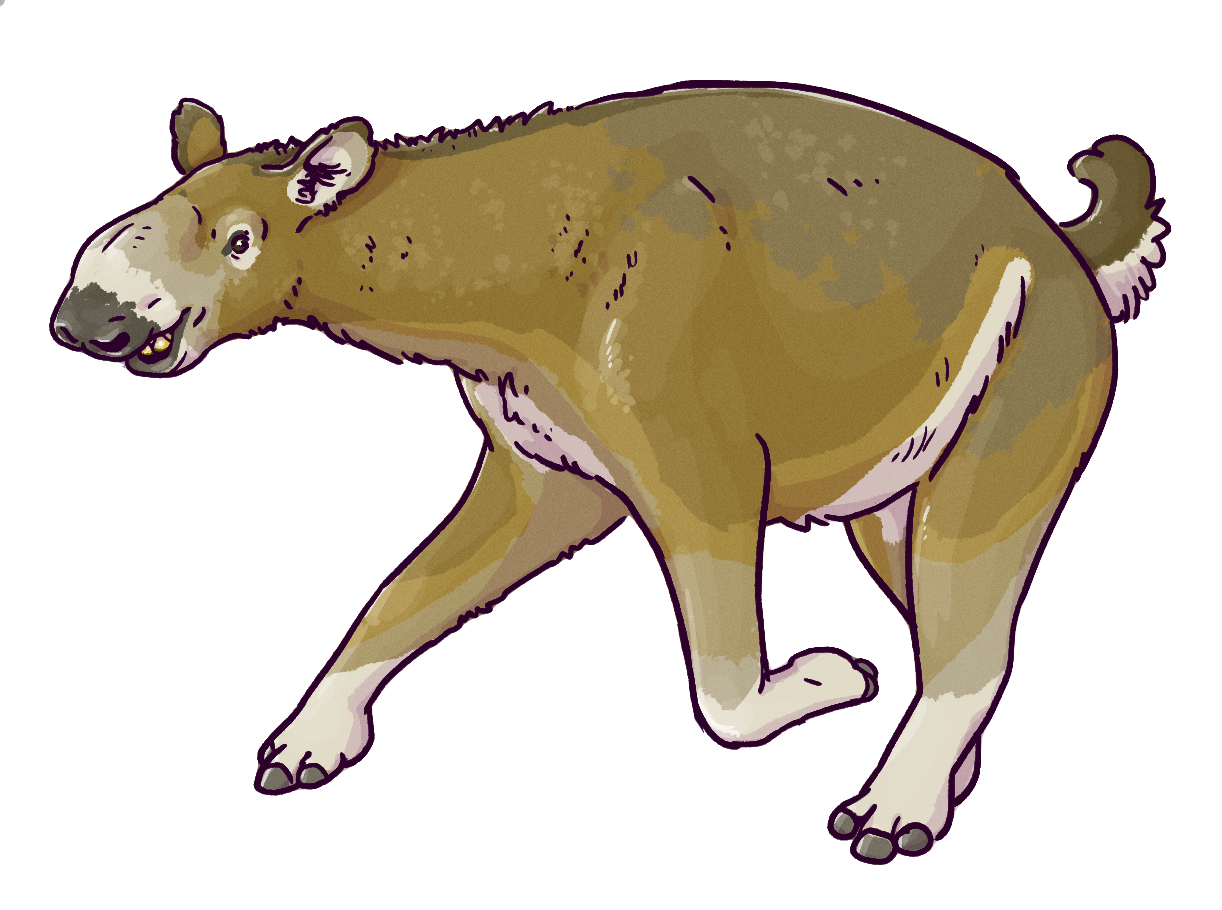
Reconstruction of Macrauchenia, a member of the extinct order Litopterna

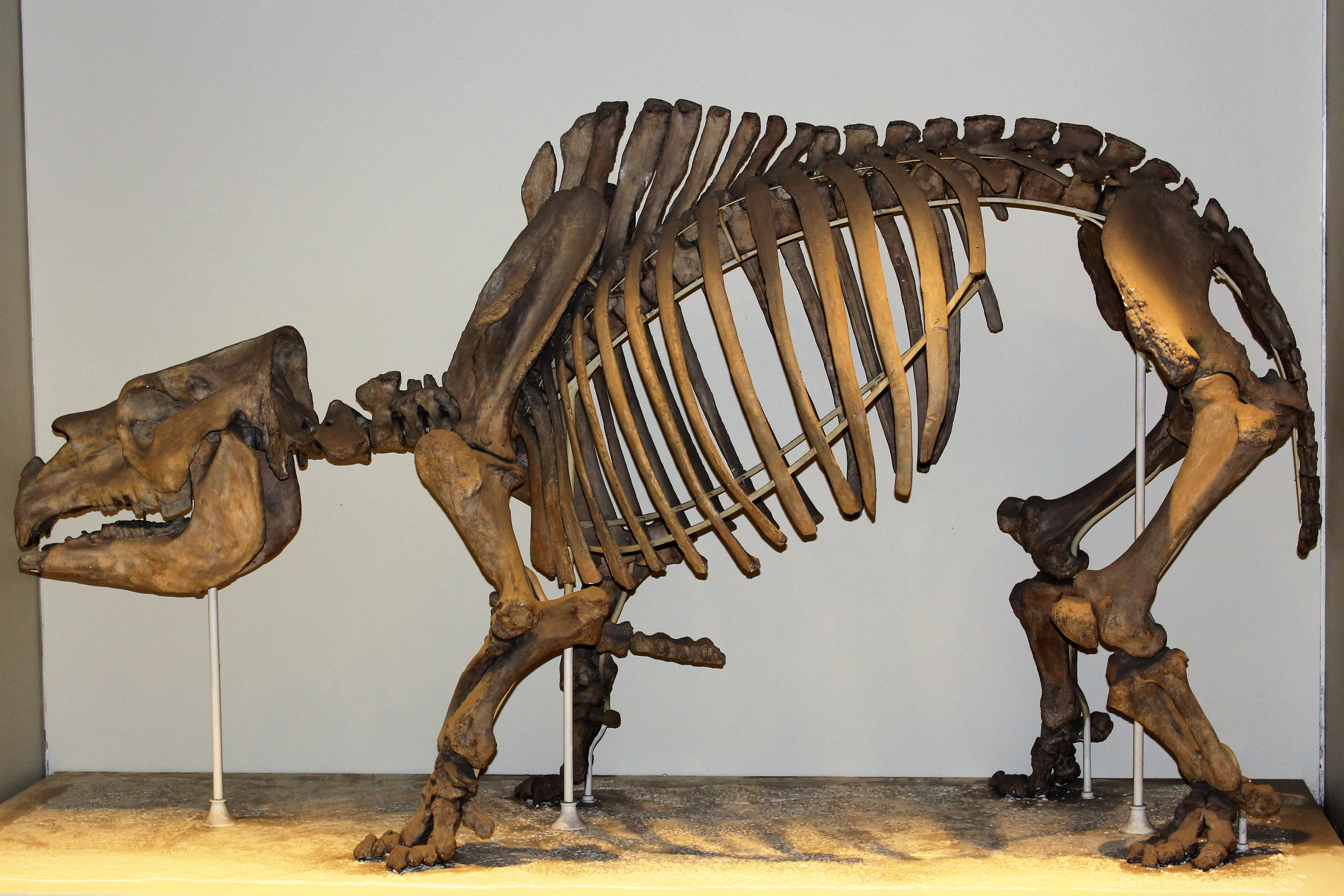
Skeleton of Toxodon, a member of the extinct order Notoungulata

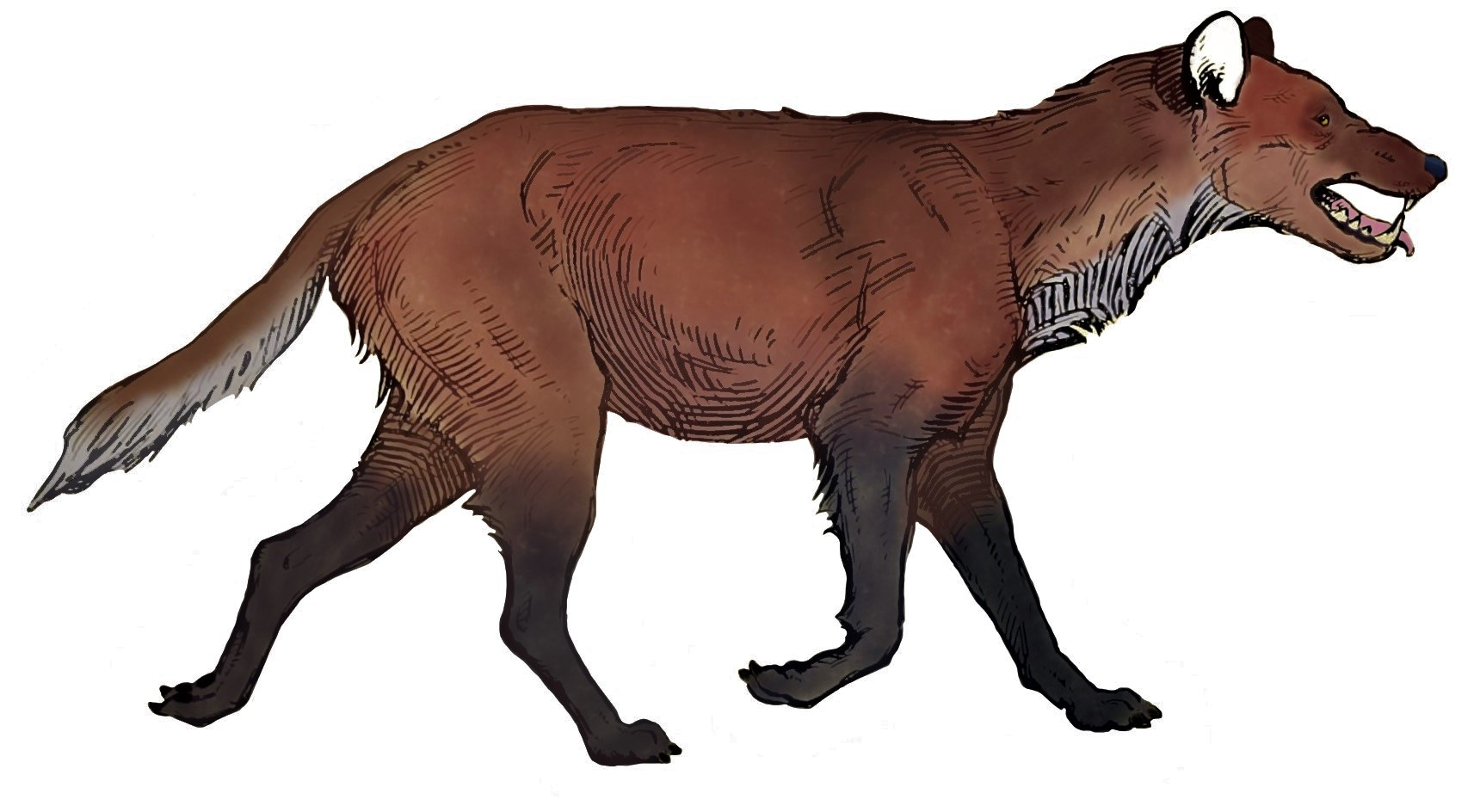
Reconstruction of the Dire wolf (Aenocyon dirus)

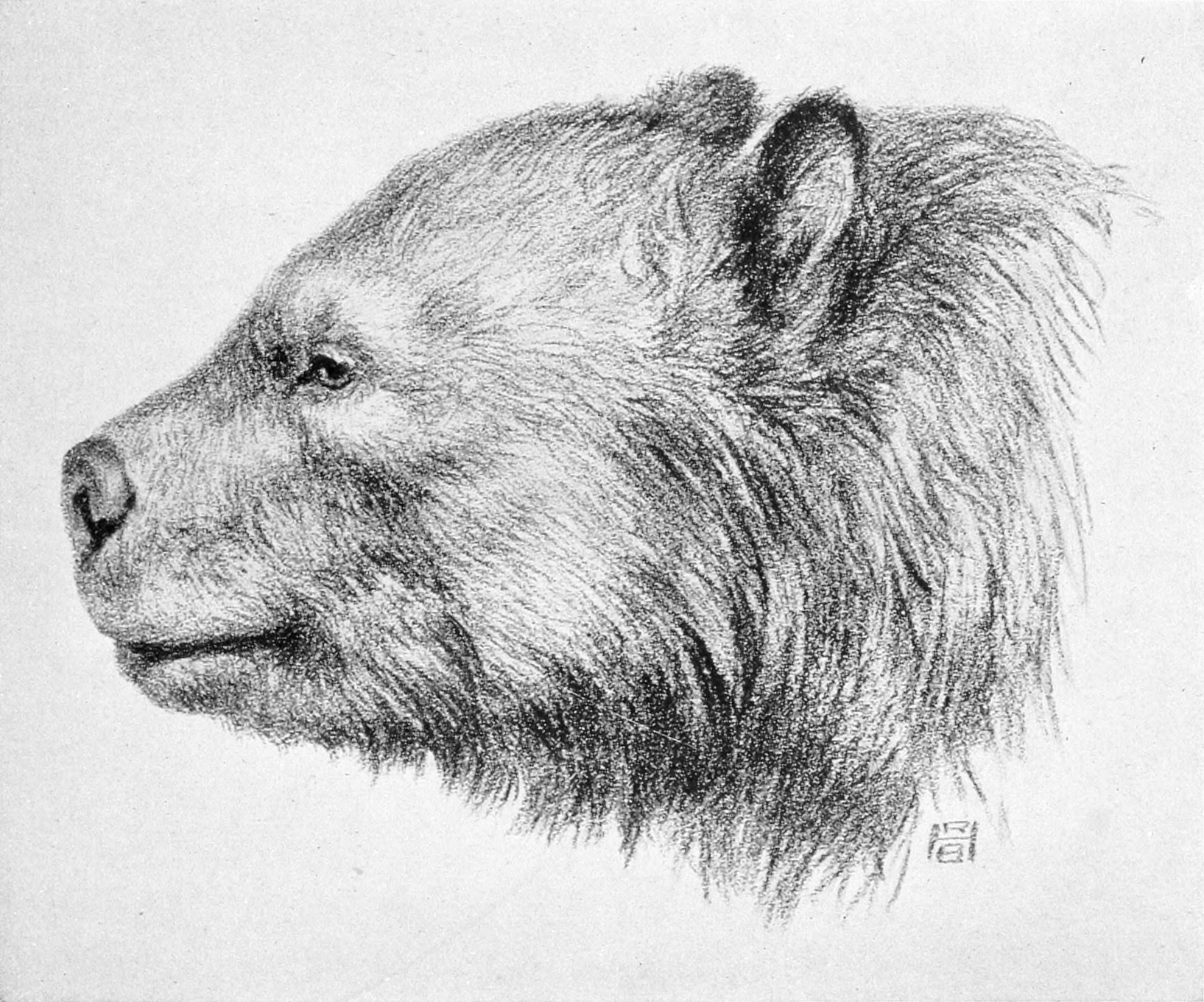
Life restoration of Arctotherium bonariense

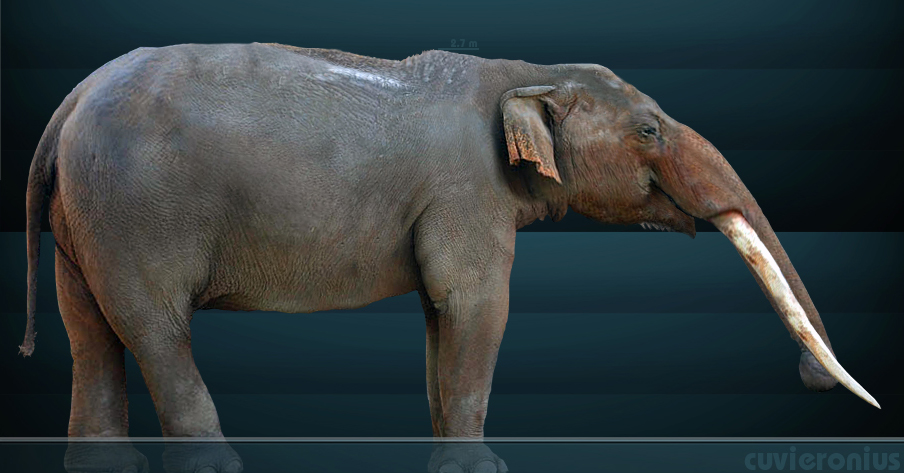
Reconstruction of the gomphothere Cuvieronius

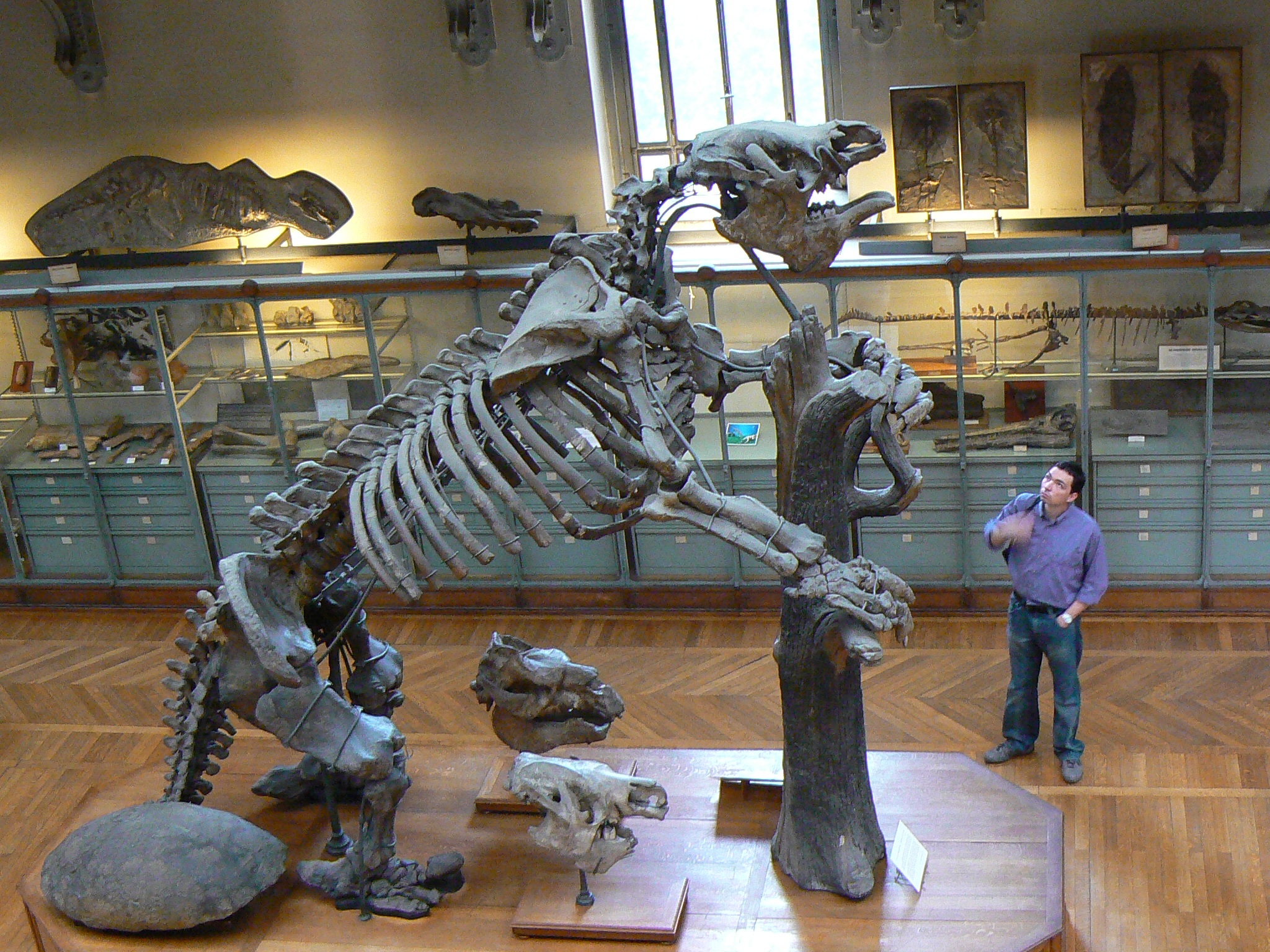
Skeleton of the giant ground sloth Megatherium

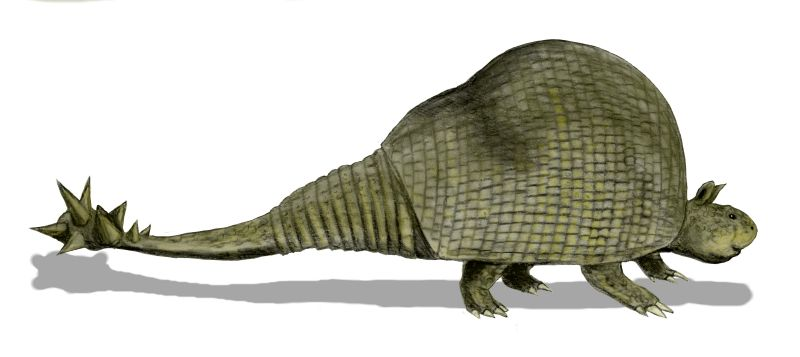
Reconstruction of the glyptodont Doedicurus clavicaudatus, distributed in the temperate savannah and woodland of South America

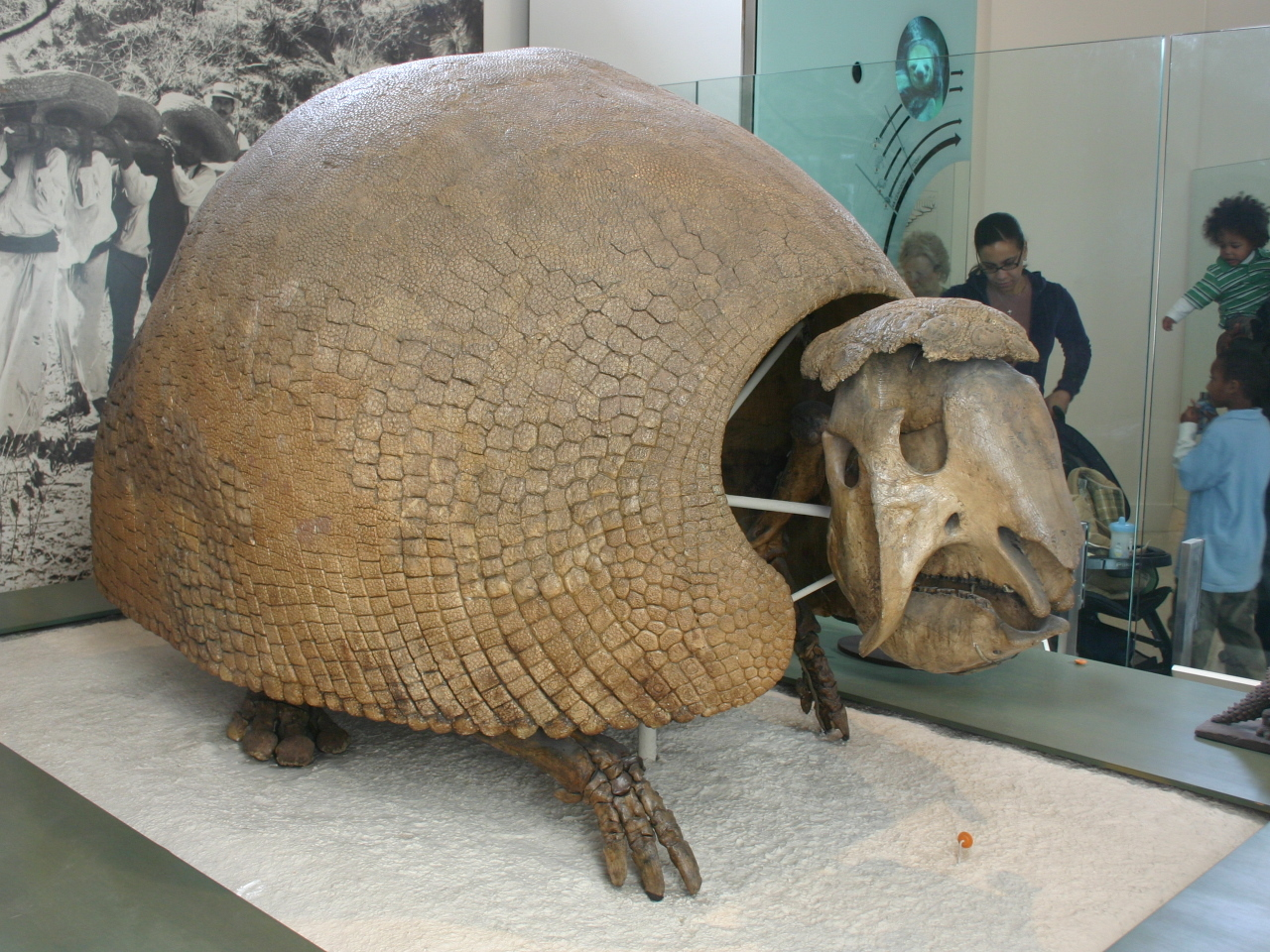
Fossil reconstruction of Panochthus frenzelianus with metal model

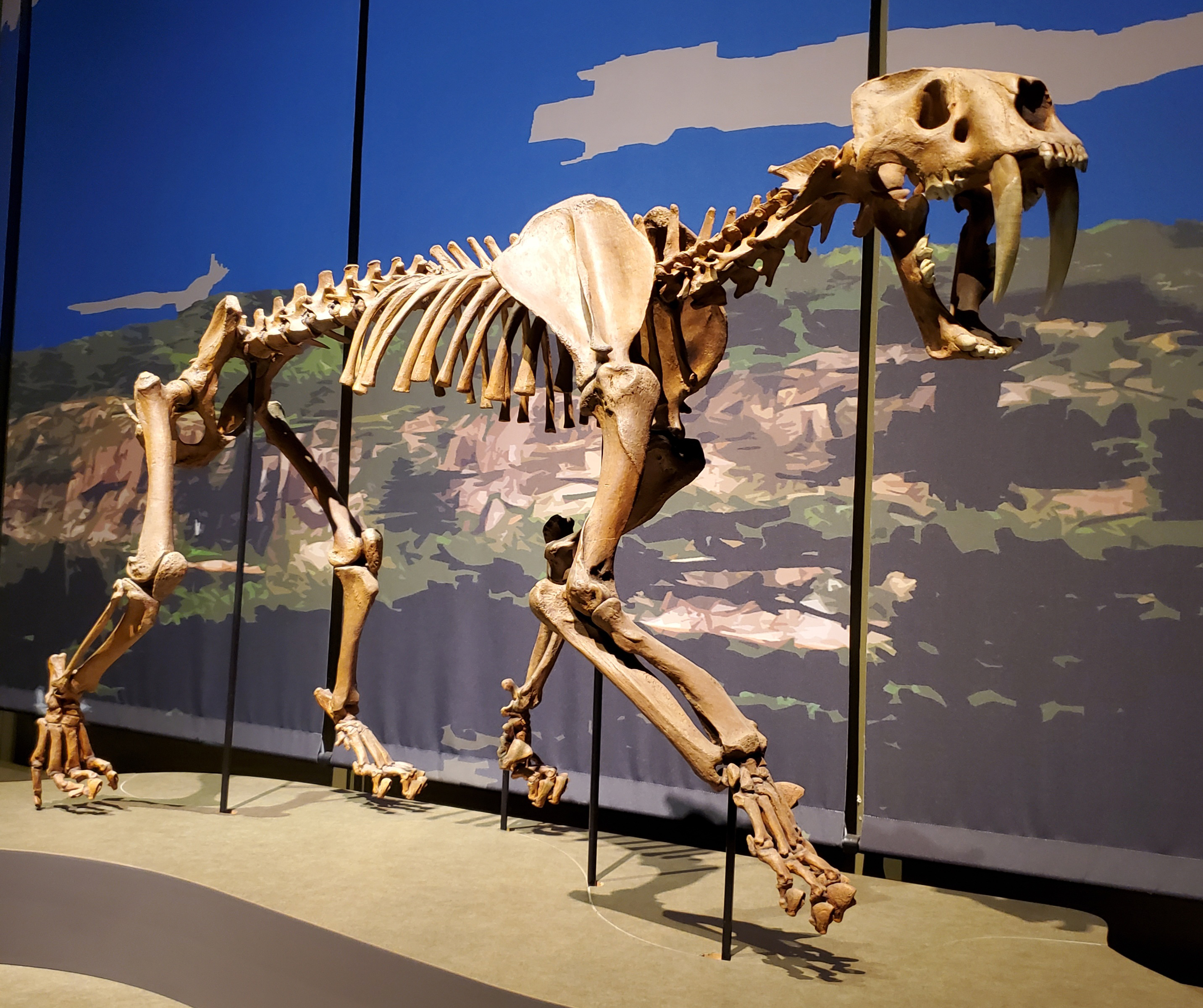
Fossil of Smilodon populator

South America suffered among the worst losses of the continents, with around 83% of its megafauna going extinct. These extinctions postdate the arrival of modern humans in South America around 15,000 years ago. Both human and climatic factors have been attributed as factors in the extinctions by various authors. Although some megafauna has been historically suggested to have survived into the early Holocene based on radiocarbon dates this may be the result of dating errors due to contamination. The extinctions are coincident with the end of the Antarctic Cold Reversal (a cooling period earlier and less severe than the Northern Hemisphere Younger Dryas) and the emergence of Fishtail projectile points, which became widespread across South America. Fishtail projectile points are thought to have been used in big game hunting, though direct evidence of exploitation of extinct megafauna by humans is rare, though megafauna exploitation has been documented at a number of sites. Fishtail points rapidly disappeared after the extinction of the megafauna, and were replaced by other styles more suited to hunting smaller prey. Some authors have proposed the "Broken Zig-Zag" model, where human hunting and climate change causing a reduction in open habitats preferred by megafauna were synergistic factors in megafauna extinction in South America.

- Ungulates
  - Even-Toed Hoofed Mammals
    - Several deer (Cervidae) spp.
      - Morenelaphus
      - Antifer
      - Epieuryceros
      - Hipocamelus sulcatus
    - Various Camelidae spp.
      - Eulamaops
      - Hemiauchenia
      - Palaeolama
  - Odd-Toed Hoofed Mammals
    - Several species of tapirs (Tapiridae)
      - Tapirus cristatellus
      - Tapirus rondoniensis
    - All Pleistocene wild horse genera (Equidae)
      - Equus neogeus
      - Hippidion
        - Hippidion devillei
        - Hippidion principale
        - Hippidion saldiasi
  - All remaining Meridiungulata genera
    - Order Litopterna
      - Macraucheniidae
        - Macrauchenia
        - Macraucheniopsis
        - Xenorhinotherium
      - Proterotheriidae
        - Neolicaphrium recens
    - Order Notoungulata
      - Toxodontidae
        - Piauhytherium (Some authors regard this taxon as synonym of Trigodonops)
        - Mixotoxodon
        - Toxodon
        - Trigodonops
- Primates
  - Platyrrhini (New World monkeys)
    - Atelidae
      - Protopithecus
      - Caipora
      - Cartelles
      - Alouatta mauroi
- Carnivora
  - Feliformia
    - Several Felidae spp.
      - Saber-toothed cat (Smilodon) spp.
        - Smilodon fatalis
        - Smilodon populator
      - Patagonian jaguar (Panthera onca mesembrina) (some authors have suggested that these remains actually belong to the American lion instead)
  - Caniformia
    - Canidae
      - Dire wolf (Aenocyon dirus)
      - Protocyon
      - Pleistocene bush dog (Speothos pacivorus)
    - Ursidae (bears)
      - South American short-faced bear (Arctotherium spp.)
        - Arctotherium bonairense (the last South American giant carnivorous short-faced bear)
        - Arctotherium tarijense (the Andean-Patagonian bear)
        - Arctotherium wingei (a medium-sized omnivorous bear)
- Rodents
  - Neochoerus
- Bats
  - Giant vampire bat (Desmodus draculae)
- Proboscidea (elephants and relatives)
  - Gomphotheridae
    - Cuvieronius
    - Notiomastodon
- Xenarthrans
  - All remaining ground sloth genera
    - Megatheriidae spp.
      - Eremotherium
      - Megatherium
    - Nothrotheriidae spp.
      - Nothropus
      - Nothrotherium
    - Megalonychidae spp.
      - Ahytherium
      - Australonyx
      - Diabolotherium
      - Megistonyx
    - Mylodontidae spp. (including Scelidotheriinae)
      - Catonyx
      - Glossotherium
      - Lestodon
      - Mylodon
      - Scelidotherium
      - Scelidodon
      - Mylodonopsis
      - Ocnotherium
      - Valgipes
  - All remaining Glyptodontinae spp.
    - Doedicurus
    - Glyptodon
    - Hoplophorus
    - Lomaphorus
    - Neosclerocalyptus
    - Neuryurus
    - Panochthus
    - Parapanochthus? (has been described as "doubtful")
    - Plaxhaplous
  - Several Dasypodidae spp.
    - Beautiful armadillo (Dasypus bellus)
    - Eutatus
    - Pachyarmatherium
    - Propaopus
  - All Pampatheriidae spp.
    - Holmesina (et 'Chlamytherium occidentale')
    - Pampatherium
    - Tonnicinctus
- Birds
  - Various Caracarinae spp.
    - Venezuelan caracara (Caracara major)
    - Seymour's caracara (Caracara seymouri)
    - Peruvian caracara (Milvago brodkorbi)
  - Various Cathartidae spp.
    - Pampagyps imperator
    - Geronogyps reliquus
    - Wingegyps cartellei
    - Pleistovultur nevesi
  - Various Tadorninae spp.
    - Neochen pugil
  - Phorusrhacidae (terror birds)
    - Psilopterinae
      - Eschatornis
      - Psilopterus?
- Reptiles
  - Crocs & Gators
    - Caiman venezuelensis
  - Testudines
    - Chelonoidis lutzae (Argentina)
    - Chelonoidis pucara (Argentina)
    - Peltocephalus maturin

=== Sahul (Australia-New Guinea) and the Pacific ===
Extinction of Australian megafauna appears to have taken place earlier than in the Americas or the extinction of the Eurasian mammoth steppe fauna, with an estimated peak of extinction of around 42,000 years ago. The "prevailing view" is that in mainland Australia and Tasmania, its megafauna had gone extinct by 40,000 years ago. Debate on megafaunal extinction in Australia has historically centred on whether the extinctions were caused by humans (which most sources estimate arrived in Australia at least 50,000 years ago, spreading to Tasmania later around 42–41,000 years ago), or whether many megafauna species had already gone extinct prior to human arrival due to climatic change. Resolution of this debate has been hampered by the rare and poorly dated nature of Australian megafauna remains. Studies from the late 2010s onward suggested that many megafauna species survived later than previously assumed by some authors, and were contemporaneous with humans in Australia, though some studies still argue that climate change was the primary cause of their extinction. There is little evidence of human interaction with extinct Australian megafauna, with one notable exception being the burning of Genyornis (a type of giant dromornithid bird related to ducks) eggshells. Megafauna species may have survived considerably later in New Guinea, until the Last Glacial Maximum, or even into the mid Holocene for some taxa.

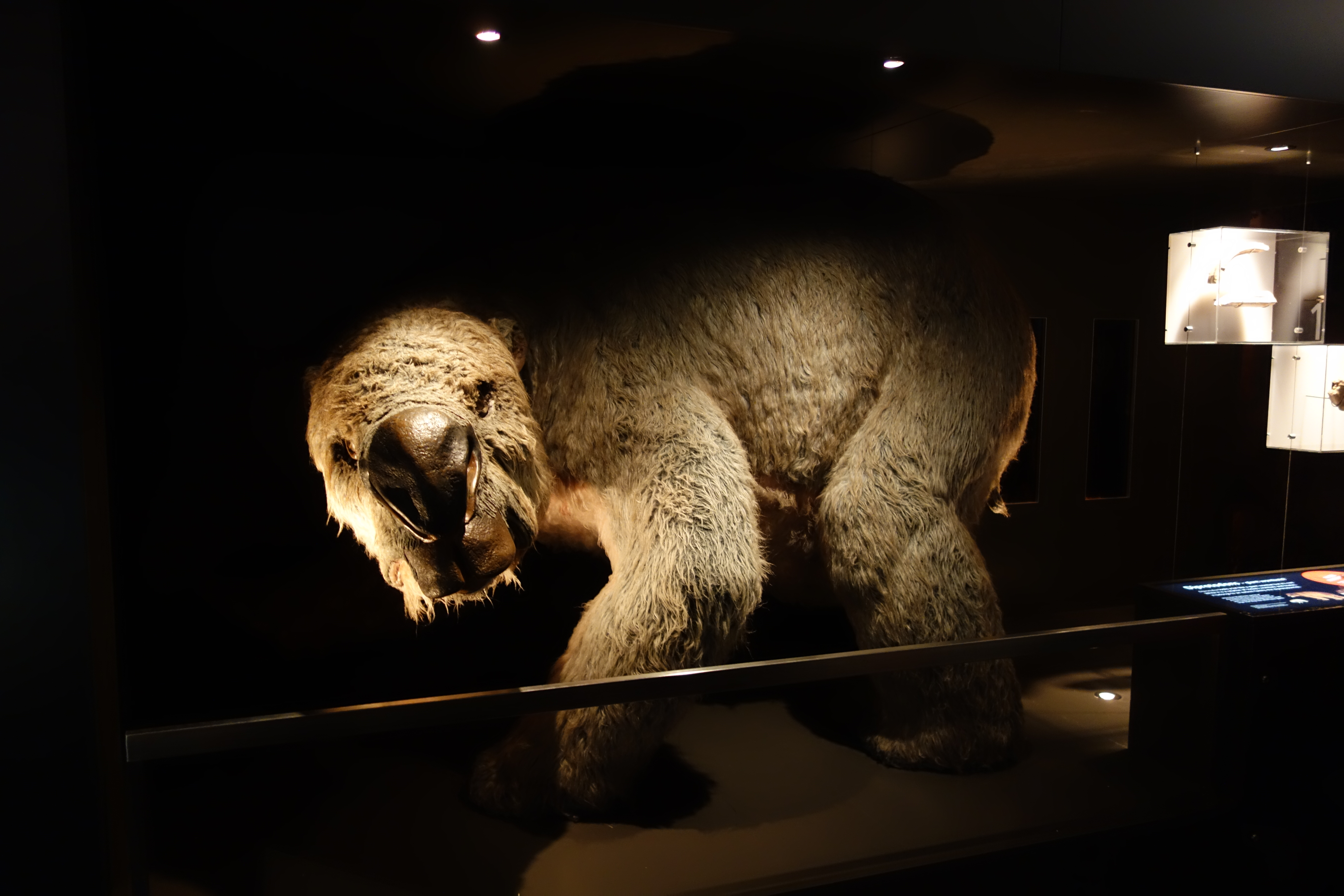
Reconstruction of a hippopotamus-sized Diprotodon

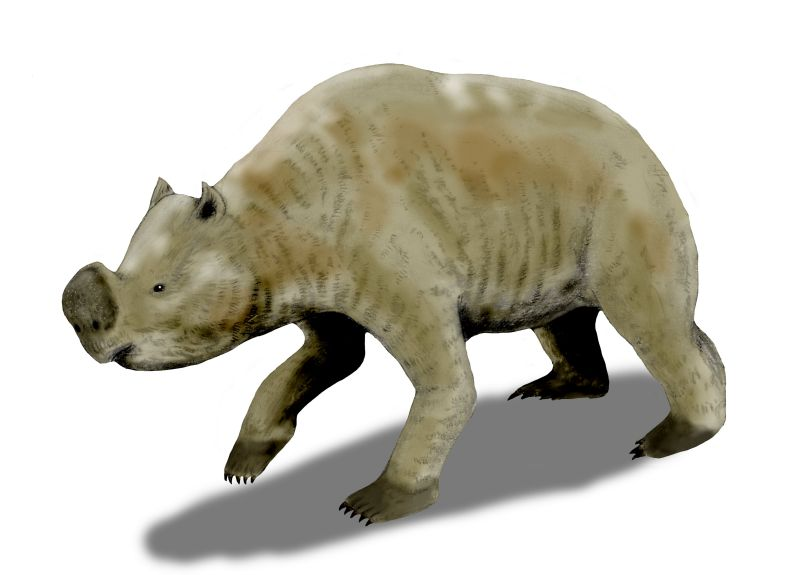
Reconstruction of Zygomaturus

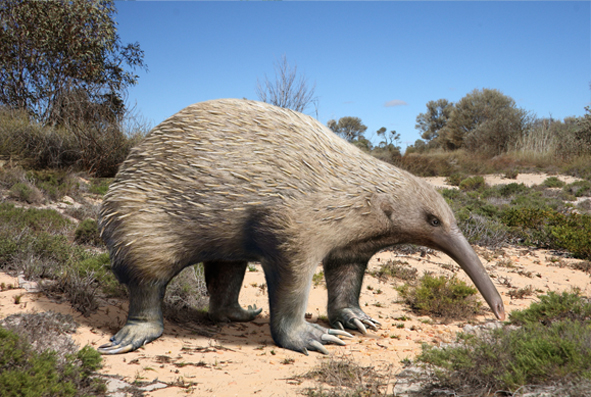
Reconstruction of the giant echidna Murrayglossus

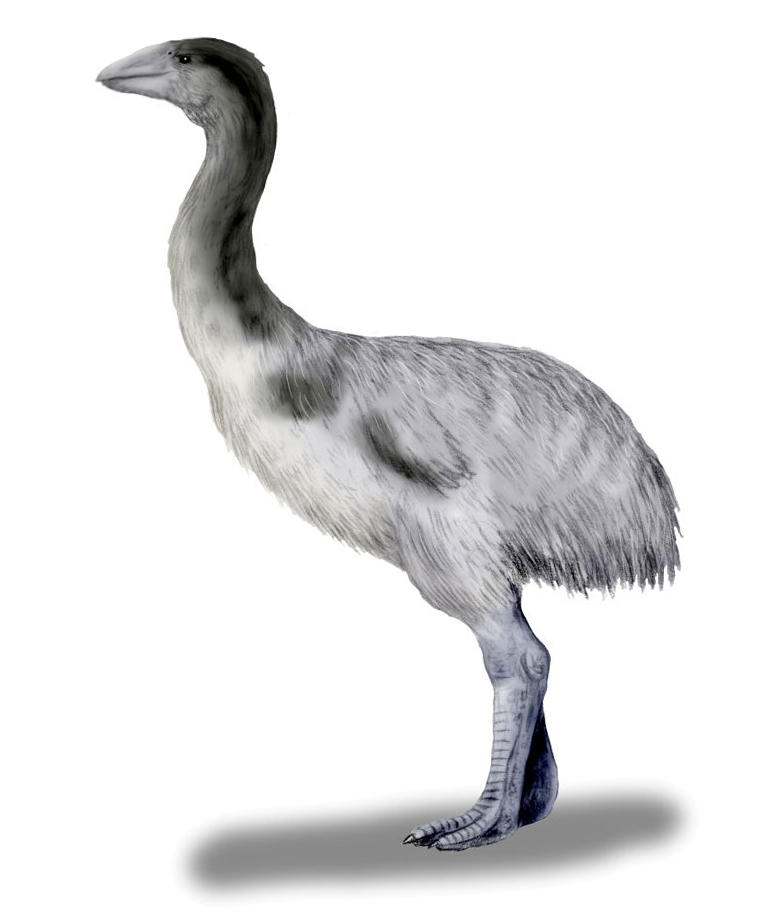
Reconstruction of Genyornis newtoni

- Marsupials
  - All remaining members of Diprotodontidae
    - Diprotodon (largest known marsupial)
    - Hulitherium tomasetti
    - Maokopia ronaldi
    - Zygomaturus
  - Palorchestes ("marsupial tapir")
  - Various members of Vombatidae
    - Lasiorhinus angustidens (giant wombat)
    - Phascolonus (giant wombat)
    - Ramasayia magna (giant wombat)
    - Vombatus hacketti (Hackett's wombat)
    - Warendja wakefieldi (dwarf wombat)
    - Sedophascolomys (giant wombat)
  - Phascolarctos stirtoni (giant koala)
  - Marsupial lion (Thylacoleo carnifex)
  - Borungaboodie (giant potoroo)
  - Various members of Macropodidae (kangaroos, wallabies, etc.)
    - Procoptodon (short-faced kangaroos) e.g.
      - Procoptodon goliah
    - Sthenurus (giant kangaroo)
    - Simosthenurus (giant kangaroo)
    - Various Macropus (giant kangaroo) spp. e.g.
      - Macropus ferragus
      - Macropus titan
      - Macropus pearsoni
    - Protemnodon spp. (giant wallaby)
    - Troposodon (wallaby)
    - Bohra (giant tree kangaroo)
    - Propleopus oscillans (omnivorous, giant musky rat-kangaroo)
    - Nombe
    - Congruus
  - Various forms of Sarcophilus (Tasmanian devil)
    - Sarcophilus laniarius (25% larger than modern species, unclear if it is actually a distinct species from living Tasmanian devil)
    - Sarcophilus moornaensis
- Monotremes: egg-laying mammals.
  - Echidna
    - Murrayglossus hacketti (giant echidna)
    - Megalibgwilia ramsayi
- Birds
  - Pygmy Cassowary (Casuarius lydekkeri)
  - Genyornis (a two-meter-tall (6.6 ft) dromornithid)
  - Giant malleefowl (Progura gallinacea)
  - Accipitridae (birds of prey)
    - Cryptogyps lacertosus
    - Dynatoaetus gaffae
  - Several Phoenicopteridae spp. (flamingos)
    - Xenorhynchopsis spp. (Australian flamingo)
    - Xenorhynchopsis minor
    - Xenorhynchopsis tibialis
- Reptiles
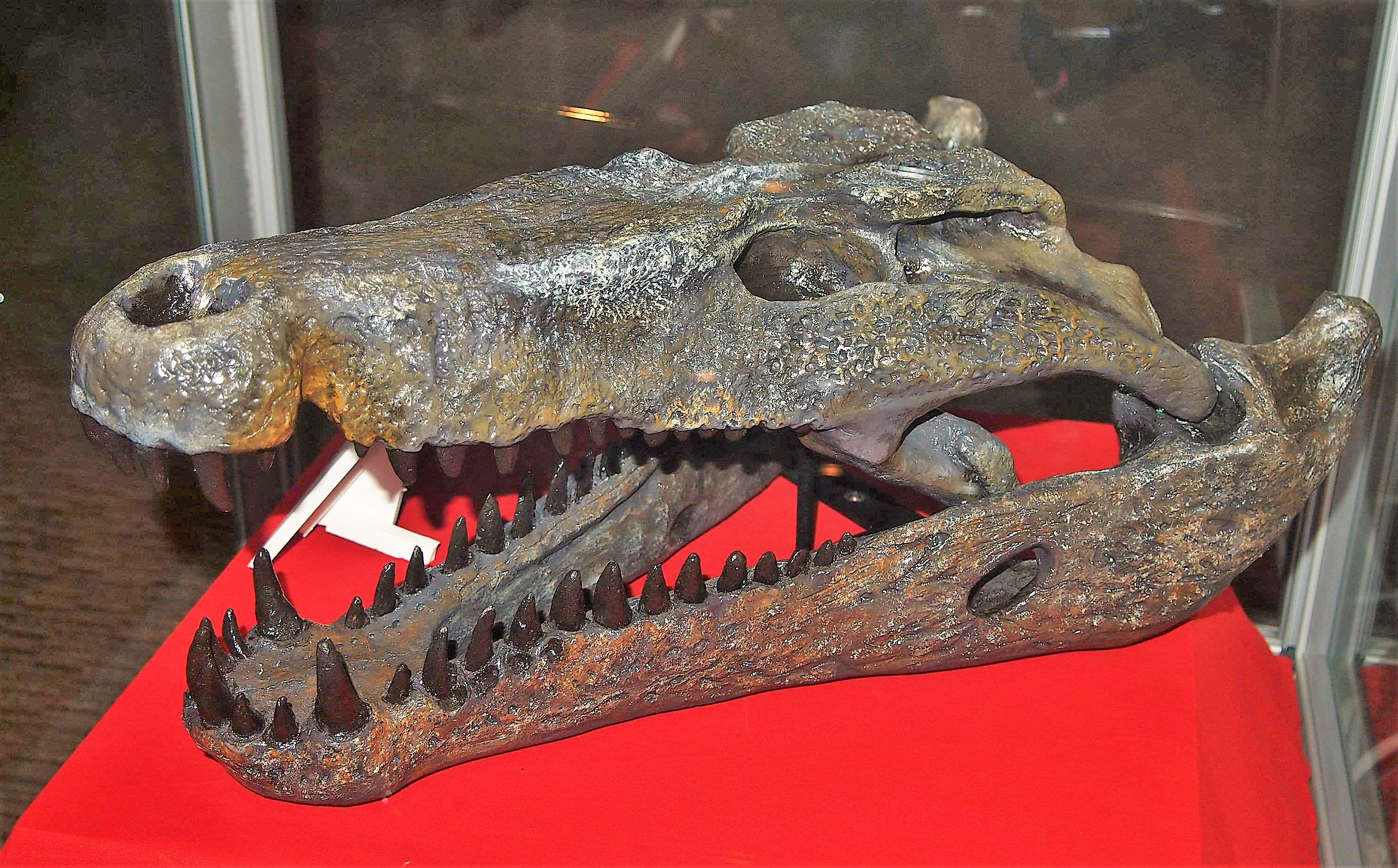
  Quinkana a mekosuchine crocodilian with a possibly terrestrial lifestyle
  - Crocodilians
    - Gavialidae
      - Ikanogavialis (the last fully marine crocodilian)
    - †Mekosuchinae
      - Paludirex (Australian freshwater mekosuchine crocodilian)
      - Quinkana (Australian terrestrial mekosuchine crocodilian, apex predator)
      - Volia (a two-to-three meter long mekosuchine crocodylian, apex predator of Pleistocene Fiji)
      - Mekosuchus
        - Mekosuchus inexpectatus (New Caledonian land crocodile)
        - Mekosuchus kalpokasi (Vanuatu land crocodile)
  - Varanus sp. (Pleistocene and Holocene New Caledonia)
  - Megalania (Varanus pricus) (a giant predatory monitor lizard comparable or larger than the Komodo dragon)
  - Snakes
    - Wonambi (a five-to-six-metre-long Australian constrictor snake)
  - Several spp. of Meiolaniidae (giant armoured turtles)
    - Meiolania
    - Ninjemys

== Causes ==
=== History of research ===
The megafaunal extinctions were already recognized as a distinct phenomenon by some scientists in the 19th century:

It is impossible to reflect without the deepest astonishment, on the changed state of [South America]. Formerly it must have swarmed with great monsters, like the southern parts of Africa, but now we find only the tapir, guanaco, armadillo, capybara; mere pigmies compared to antecedents races... Since their loss, no very great physical changes can have taken place in the nature of the Country. What then has exterminated so many living creatures?

— Charles Darwin, The Voyage of the Beagle (1834)

It is clear, therefore, that we are now in an altogether exceptional period of the earth's history. We live in a zoologically impoverished world, from which all the hugest, and fiercest, and strangest forms have recently disappeared; and it is, no doubt, a much better world for us now they have gone. Yet it is surely a marvellous fact, and one that has hardly been sufficiently dwelt upon, this sudden dying out of so many large mammalia, not in one place only but over half the land surface of the globe. We cannot but believe that there must have been some physical cause for this great change; and it must have been a cause capable of acting almost simultaneously over large portions of the earth's surface, and one which, as far as the Tertiary period at least is concerned, was of an exceptional character.

— Alfred Russel Wallace, The geographical distribution of animals; with a study of the relations of living and extinct faunas as elucidating the past changes of the Earth's surface (1876)

Several decades later in his 1911 book The World of Life (published 2 years before his death), Wallace revisited the issue of the Pleistocene megafauna extinctions, concluding that the extinctions were at least in part the result of human agency in combination with other factors. Discussion of the topic became more widespread during the 20th century, particularly following the proposal of the "overkill hypothesis" by Paul Schultz Martin during the 1960s. By the end of the 20th century, two "camps" of researchers had emerged on the topic, one supporting climate change, the other supporting human hunting as the primary cause of the extinctions. A 2025 review found that the literature remained deeply divided on the issue, though the support for the various hypotheses varied by discipline, with ecologists having greater support for human causation than other disciplines. Overall, in literature published from 2020 to 2024, fewer authors expressed support for climate change alone as the cause than either human causation alone or mixed human-climate causation.

=== Mainstream hypotheses ===
==== Human-related ====
===== Hunting =====
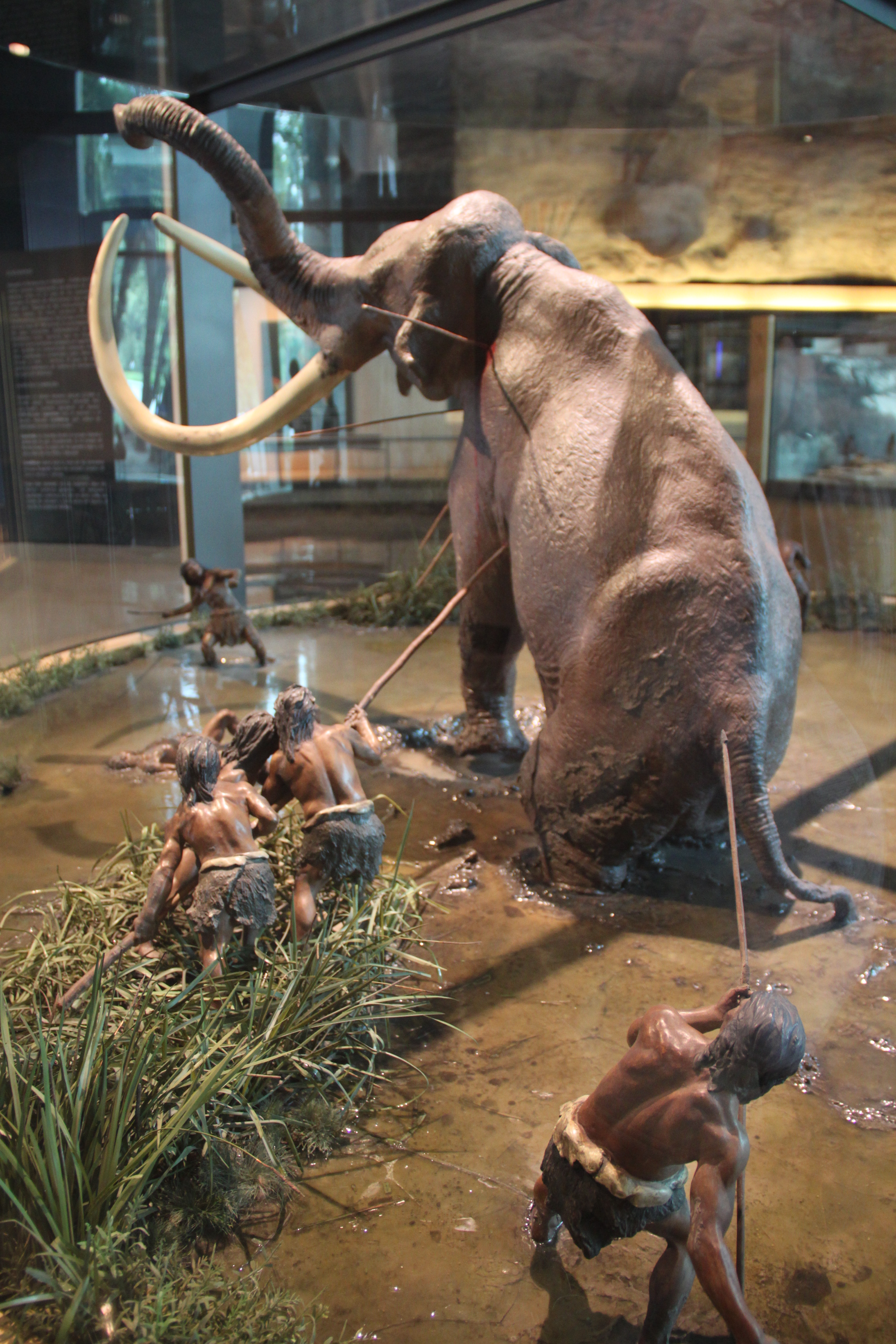
Diorama of a Paleoindian Columbian mammoth (Mammuthus columbi) hunting scene at the National Museum of Anthropology, Mexico City

The hunting hypothesis suggests that humans hunted megaherbivores to extinction, which in turn caused the extinction of carnivores and scavengers which had preyed upon those animals. This hypothesis holds Pleistocene humans responsible for the megafaunal extinction. One variant, known as blitzkrieg, portrays this process as relatively quick. Some of the direct evidence for this includes: fossils of some megafauna found in conjunction with human remains, embedded arrows and tool cut marks found in megafaunal bones, and European cave paintings that depict such hunting. Biogeographical evidence is also suggestive: the areas of the world where humans evolved currently have more of their Pleistocene megafaunal diversity (the elephants and rhinos of Asia and Africa) compared to other areas such as Australia, the Americas, Madagascar and New Zealand without the earliest humans. The overkill hypothesis, a variant of the hunting hypothesis, was proposed in 1966 by Paul S. Martin, Professor of Geosciences Emeritus at the Desert Laboratory of the University of Arizona.

Despeciation within the genus Homo.

Circumstantially, the close correlation in time between the appearance of humans in an area and extinction there provides weight for this scenario. Radiocarbon dating has supported the plausibility of this correlation being reflective of causation. The megafaunal extinctions covered a vast period of time and highly variable climatic situations. The earliest extinctions in Australia were complete approximately 50,000 BP, well before the Last Glacial Maximum and before rises in temperature. The most recent extinction in New Zealand was complete no earlier than 500 BP and during a period of cooling. In between these extremes megafaunal extinctions have occurred progressively in such places as North America, South America and Madagascar with no climatic commonality. The only common factor that can be ascertained is the arrival of humans. This phenomenon appears even within regions. The mammal extinction wave in Australia about 50,000 years ago coincides not with known climatic changes, but with the arrival of humans. In addition, large mammal species like the giant kangaroo Protemnodon appear to have succumbed sooner on the Australian mainland than on Tasmania, which was colonised by humans a few thousand years later. A study published in 2015 supported the hypothesis further by running several thousand scenarios that correlated the time windows in which each species is known to have become extinct with the arrival of humans on different continents or islands. This was compared against climate reconstructions for the last 90,000 years. The researchers found correlations of human spread and species extinction indicating that the human impact was the main cause of the extinction, while climate change exacerbated the frequency of extinctions. The study, however, found an apparently low extinction rate in the fossil record of mainland Asia.

A map of early human migrations

A 2020 study published in Science Advances found that human population size and/or specific human activities, not climate change, caused rapidly rising global mammal extinction rates during the past 126,000 years. Around 96% of all mammalian extinctions over this time period are attributable to human impacts. According to Tobias Andermann, lead author of the study, "these extinctions did not happen continuously and at constant pace. Instead, bursts of extinctions are detected across different continents at times when humans first reached them. More recently, the magnitude of human driven extinctions has picked up the pace again, this time on a global scale." On a related note, the population declines of still extant megafauna during the Pleistocene have also been shown to correlate with human expansion rather than climate change.

The extinction's extreme bias towards larger animals further supports a relationship with human activity rather than climate change. There is evidence that the average size of mammalian fauna declined over the course of the Quaternary, a phenomenon that was likely linked to disproportionate hunting of large animals by humans.

Extinction through human hunting has been supported by archaeological finds of mammoths with projectile points embedded in their skeletons, by observations of modern naive animals allowing hunters to approach easily and by computer models by Mosimann and Martin, and Whittington and Dyke, and most recently by Alroy.

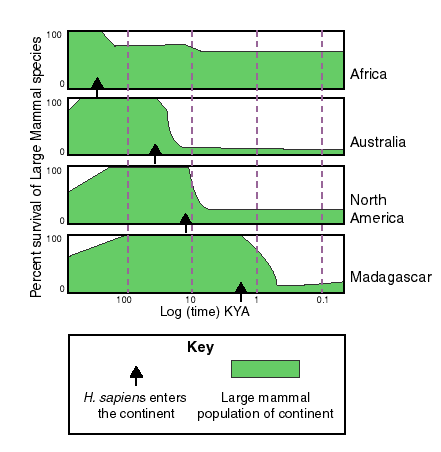
The timing of extinctions follows the "March of Man"

In 2024 a paper was published in Science Advances that added additional support to the overkill hypothesis in North America when the skull of an 18 month old child, dated to 12,800 years ago, was analyzed for chemical signatures attributable to both maternal milk and solid food. Specific isotopes of carbon and nitrogen most closely matched those that would have been found in the mammoth genus and secondarily elk or bison.

A number of objections have been raised regarding the hunting hypothesis. Notable among them is the sparsity of evidence of human hunting of megafauna. There is no archeological evidence that in North America megafauna other than mammoths, mastodons, gomphotheres and bison were hunted, despite the fact that, for example, camels and horses are very frequently reported in fossil history. Overkill proponents, however, say this is due to the fast extinction process in North America and the low probability of animals with signs of butchery to be preserved. The majority of North American taxa have too sparse a fossil record to accurately assess the frequency of human hunting of them. A study by Surovell and Grund concluded "archaeological sites dating to the time of the coexistence of humans and extinct fauna are rare. Those that preserve bone are considerably more rare, and of those, only a very few show unambiguous evidence of human hunting of any type of prey whatsoever." Eugene S. Hunn suggests that the birthrate in hunter-gatherer societies is generally too low, that too much effort is involved in the bringing down of a large animal by a hunting party, and that in order for hunter-gatherers to have brought about the extinction of megafauna simply by hunting them to death, an extraordinary amount of meat would have had to have been wasted. Proponents of hunting as a cause of the extinctions argue that statistical modelling validates that relatively low-level hunting can have significant effect on megafauna populations due to their slow life cycles, and that hunting can cause top-down forcing trophic cascade events that destabilize ecosystems.

===== Second-order predation =====
The Second-Order Predation Hypothesis says that as humans entered the New World they continued their policy of killing predators, which had been successful in the Old World but because they were more efficient and because the fauna, both herbivores and carnivores, were more naive, they killed off enough carnivores to upset the ecological balance of the continent, causing overpopulation, environmental exhaustion, and environmental collapse. The hypothesis accounts for changes in animal, plant, and human populations.

The scenario is as follows:

- After the arrival of H. sapiens in the New World, existing predators must share the prey populations with this new predator. Because of this competition, populations of original, or first-order, predators cannot find enough food; they are in direct competition with humans.
- Second-order predation begins as humans begin to kill predators.
- Prey populations are no longer well controlled by predation. Killing of nonhuman predators by H. sapiens reduces their numbers to a point where these predators no longer regulate the size of the prey populations.
- Lack of regulation by first-order predators triggers boom-and-bust cycles in prey populations. Prey populations expand and consequently overgraze and over-browse the land. Soon the environment is no longer able to support them. As a result, many herbivores starve. Species that rely on the slowest recruiting food become extinct, followed by species that cannot extract the maximum benefit from every bit of their food.
- Boom-bust cycles in herbivore populations change the nature of the vegetative environment, with consequent climatic impacts on relative humidity and continentality. Through overgrazing and overbrowsing, mixed parkland becomes grassland, and climatic continentality increases.

The second-order predation hypothesis has been supported by a computer model, the Pleistocene extinction model (PEM), which, using the same assumptions and values for all variables (herbivore population, herbivore recruitment rates, food needed per human, herbivore hunting rates, etc.) other than those for hunting of predators. It compares the overkill hypothesis (predator hunting = 0) with second-order predation (predator hunting varied between 0.01 and 0.05 for different runs). The findings are that second-order predation is more consistent with extinction than is overkill (results graph at left). The Pleistocene extinction model is the only test of multiple hypotheses and is the only model to specifically test combination hypotheses by artificially introducing sufficient climate change to cause extinction. When overkill and climate change are combined they balance each other out. Climate change reduces the number of plants, overkill removes animals, therefore fewer plants are eaten. Second-order predation combined with climate change exacerbates the effect of climate change. (results graph at right). The second-order predation hypothesis is further supported by the observation above that there was a massive increase in bison populations.

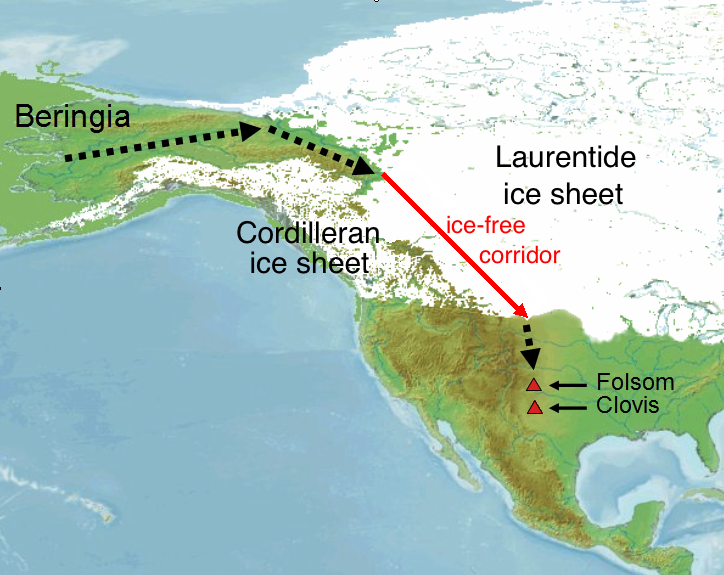
Approximate location of the ice-free corridor and specific Paleoindian sites, according to the Clovis theory

However, this hypothesis has been criticised on the grounds that the multispecies model produces a mass extinction through indirect competition between herbivore species: small species with high reproductive rates subsidize predation on large species with low reproductive rates. All prey species are lumped in the Pleistocene extinction model. Also, the control of population sizes by predators is not fully supported by observations of modern ecosystems. The hypothesis further assumes decreases in vegetation due to climate change, but deglaciation doubled the habitable area of North America. Any vegetational changes that did occur failed to cause almost any extinctions of small vertebrates, and they are more narrowly distributed on average, which detractors cite as evidence against the hypothesis.

===== Landscape alteration =====
One consequence of the colonisation by humans of lands previously uninhabited by them may have been the introduction of new fire regimes because of extensive fire use by humans. There is evidence that anthropogenic fire use had major impacts on the local environments in both Australia and North America.

===== Competition for water =====
In southeastern Australia, the scarcity of water during the interval in which humans arrived in Australia suggests that human competition with megafauna for precious water sources may have played a role in the extinction of the latter.

==== Climate change ====
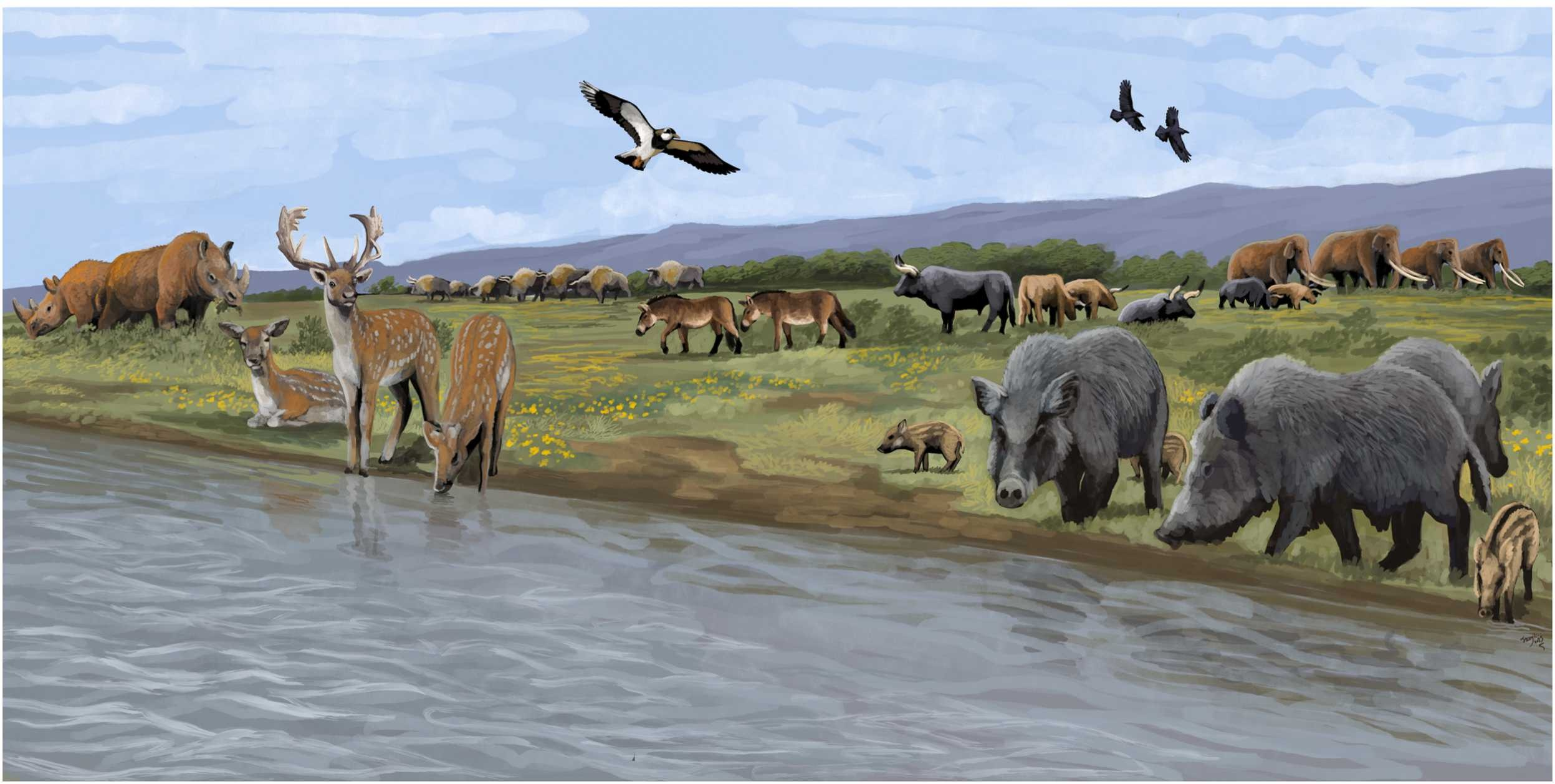
A European Last Interglacial landscape, featuring the straight-tusked elephant (background right), the narrow-nosed rhinoceros (far left), steppe bison (background centre left), wild horse (background centre) and aurochs (background centre right).

At the end of the 19th and beginning of the 20th centuries, when scientists first realized that there had been glacial and interglacial ages, and that they were somehow associated with the prevalence or disappearance of certain animals, they surmised that the termination of the Pleistocene ice age might be an explanation for the extinctions.

The most obvious change associated with the termination of an ice age is the increase in temperature. Between 15,000 BP and 10,000 BP, a 6 °C increase in global mean annual temperatures occurred. This was generally thought to be the cause of the extinctions. According to this hypothesis, a temperature increase sufficient to melt the Wisconsin ice sheet could have placed enough thermal stress on cold-adapted mammals to cause them to die. Their heavy fur, which helps conserve body heat in the glacial cold, might have prevented the dumping of excess heat, causing the mammals to die of heat exhaustion. Large mammals, with their reduced surface area-to-volume ratio, would have fared worse than small mammals. A study covering the past 56,000 years indicates that rapid warming events with temperature changes of up to 16 °C (29 °F) had an important impact on the extinction of megafauna. Ancient DNA and radiocarbon data indicates that local genetic populations were replaced by others within the same species or by others within the same genus. Survival of populations was dependent on the existence of refugia and long distance dispersals, which may have been disrupted by human hunters.

Other scientists have proposed that increasingly extreme weather—hotter summers and colder winters—referred to as "continentality", or related changes in rainfall caused the extinctions. It has been shown that vegetation changed from mixed woodland-parkland to separate prairie and woodland. This may have affected the kinds of food available. Shorter growing seasons may have caused the extinction of large herbivores and the dwarfing of many others. In this case, as observed, bison and other large ruminants would have fared better than horses, elephants and other monogastrics, because ruminants are able to extract more nutrition from limited quantities of high-fiber food and better able to deal with anti-herbivory toxins. So, in general, when vegetation becomes more specialized, herbivores with less diet flexibility may be less able to find the mix of vegetation they need to sustain life and reproduce, within a given area. Increased continentality resulted in reduced and less predictable rainfall limiting the availability of plants necessary for energy and nutrition. It has been suggested that this change in rainfall restricted the amount of time favorable for reproduction. This could disproportionately harm large animals, since they have longer, more inflexible mating periods, and so may have produced young at unfavorable seasons (i.e., when sufficient food, water, or shelter was unavailable because of shifts in the growing season). In contrast, small mammals, with their shorter life cycles, shorter reproductive cycles, and shorter gestation periods, could have adjusted to the increased unpredictability of the climate, both as individuals and as species which allowed them to synchronize their reproductive efforts with conditions favorable for offspring survival. If so, smaller mammals would have lost fewer offspring and would have been better able to repeat the reproductive effort when circumstances once more favored offspring survival. A study looking at the environmental conditions across Europe, Siberia and the Americas from 25,000 to 10,000 YBP found that prolonged warming events leading to deglaciation and maximum rainfall occurred just prior to the transformation of the rangelands that supported megaherbivores into widespread wetlands that supported herbivore-resistant plants. The study proposes that moisture-driven environmental change led to the megafaunal extinctions and that Africa's trans-equatorial position allowed rangeland to continue to exist between the deserts and the central forests, therefore fewer megafauna species became extinct there.

Evidence in Southeast Asia, in contrast to Europe, Australia, and the Americas, suggests that climate change and an increasing sea level were significant factors in the extinction of several herbivorous species. Alterations in vegetation growth and new access routes for early humans and mammals to previously isolated, localized ecosystems were detrimental to select groups of fauna.

Some evidence from Europe also suggests climatic changes were responsible for extinctions there, as the individuals extinctions tended to occur during times of environmental change and did not correlate particularly well with human migrations.

In Australia, some studies have suggested that extinctions of megafauna began before the peopling of the continent, favouring climate change as the driver.

In Beringia, megafauna may have gone extinct because of particularly intense paludification and because the land connection between Eurasia and North America flooded before the Cordilleran Ice Sheet retreated far enough to reopen the corridor between Beringia and the remainder of North America. Woolly mammoths became extirpated from Beringia because of climatic factors, although human activity also played a synergistic role in their decline. In North America, a Radiocarbon-dated Event-Count (REC) modelling study found that megafaunal declines in North America correlated with climatic changes instead of human population expansion.

In the North American Great Lakes region, the population declines of mastodons and mammoths have been found to correlate with climatic fluctuations during the Younger Dryas rather than human activity.

In the Argentine Pampas, the flooding of vast swathes of the once much larger Pampas grasslands may have played a role in the extinctions of its megafaunal assemblages.

Critics object that since there were multiple glacial advances and withdrawals in the evolutionary history of many of the megafauna, it is rather implausible that only after the last glacial maximum would there be such extinctions. Proponents of climate change as the extinction event's cause like David J. Meltzer suggest that the last deglaciation may have been markedly different from previous ones. Also, one study suggests that the Pleistocene megafaunal composition may have differed markedly from that of earlier interglacials, making the Pleistocene populations particularly vulnerable to changes in their environment.

Studies propose that the annual mean temperature of the current interglacial that we have seen for the last 10,000 years is no higher than that of previous interglacials, yet most of the same large mammals survived similar temperature increases. In addition, numerous species such as mammoths on Wrangel Island and St. Paul Island survived in human-free refugia despite changes in climate. This would not be expected if climate change were responsible (unless their maritime climates offered some protection against climate change not afforded to coastal populations on the mainland). Under normal ecological assumptions island populations should be more vulnerable to extinction due to climate change because of small populations and an inability to migrate to more favorable climes.

Critics have also identified a number of problems with the continentality hypotheses. Megaherbivores have prospered at other times of continental climate. For example, megaherbivores thrived in Pleistocene Siberia, which had and has a more continental climate than Pleistocene or modern (post-Pleistocene, interglacial) North America. The animals that became extinct actually should have prospered during the shift from mixed woodland-parkland to prairie, because their primary food source, grass, was increasing rather than decreasing. Although the vegetation did become more spatially specialized, the amount of prairie and grass available increased, which would have been good for horses and for mammoths, and yet they became extinct. This criticism ignores the increased abundance and broad geographic extent of Pleistocene bison at the end of the Pleistocene, which would have increased competition for these resources in a manner not seen in any earlier interglacials. Although horses became extinct in the New World, they were successfully reintroduced by the Spanish in the 16th century—into a modern post-Pleistocene, interglacial climate. Today there are feral horses still living in those same environments. They find a sufficient mix of food to avoid toxins, they extract enough nutrition from forage to reproduce effectively and the timing of their gestation is not an issue. This criticism ignores the fact that present-day horses are not competing for resources with ground sloths, mammoths, mastodons, camels, llamas, and bison. Similarly, mammoths survived the Pleistocene Holocene transition on isolated, uninhabited islands in the Mediterranean Sea until 4,000 to 7,000 years ago, as well as on Wrangel Island in the Siberian Arctic. Additionally, large mammals should have been able to migrate, permanently or seasonally, if they found the temperature too extreme, the breeding season too short, or the rainfall too sparse or unpredictable. Seasons vary geographically. By migrating away from the equator, herbivores could have found areas with growing seasons more favorable for finding food and breeding successfully. Modern-day African elephants migrate during periods of drought to places where there is apt to be water. Large animals also store more fat in their bodies than do medium-sized animals and this should have allowed them to compensate for extreme seasonal fluctuations in food availability.

Some evidence weighs against climate change as a valid hypothesis as applied to Australia. It has been shown that the prevailing climate at the time of extinction (40,000–50,000 BP) was similar to that of today, and that the extinct animals were strongly adapted to an arid climate. The evidence indicates that all of the extinctions took place in the same short time period, which was the time when humans entered the landscape. The main mechanism for extinction was probably fire (started by humans) in a then much less fire-adapted landscape. Isotopic evidence shows sudden changes in the diet of surviving species, which could correspond to the stress they experienced before extinction.

Some evidence obtained from analysis of the tusks of mastodons from the American Great Lakes region appears inconsistent with the climate change hypothesis. Over a span of several thousand years prior to their extinction in the area, the mastodons show a trend of declining age at maturation. This is the opposite of what one would expect if they were experiencing stresses from deteriorating environmental conditions, but is consistent with a reduction in intraspecific competition that would result from a population being reduced by human hunting.

It may be observed that neither the overkill nor the climate change hypotheses can fully explain events: browsers, mixed feeders and non-ruminant grazer species suffered most, while relatively more ruminant grazers survived. However, a broader variation of the overkill hypothesis may predict this, because changes in vegetation wrought by either Second Order Predation (see below) or anthropogenic fire preferentially selects against browse species.

=== Other hypotheses ===
==== Disease ====
The hyperdisease hypothesis, as advanced by Ross D. E. MacPhee and Preston A. Marx, attributes the extinction of large mammals during the late Pleistocene to indirect effects of the newly arrived aboriginal humans. In more recent times, disease has driven many vulnerable species to extinction; the introduction of avian malaria and avipoxvirus, for example, has greatly decreased the populations of the endemic birds of Hawaii, with some going extinct. The hyperdisease hypothesis proposes that humans or animals traveling with them (e.g., chickens or domestic dogs) introduced one or more highly virulent diseases into vulnerable populations of native mammals, eventually causing extinctions. The extinction was biased toward larger-sized species because smaller species have greater resilience because of their life history traits (e.g., shorter gestation time, greater population sizes, etc.). Humans are thought to be the cause because other earlier immigrations of mammals into North America from Eurasia did not cause extinctions. A similar suggestion is that pathogens were transmitted by the expanding humans via the domesticated dogs they brought with them. A related theory proposes that a highly contagious prion disease similar to chronic wasting disease or scrapie that was capable of infecting a large number of species was the culprit. Animals weakened by this "superprion" would also have easily become reservoirs of viral and bacterial diseases as they succumbed to neurological degeneration from the prion, causing a cascade of different diseases to spread among various mammal species. This theory could potentially explain the prevalence of heterozygosity at codon 129 of the prion protein gene in humans, which has been speculated to be the result of natural selection against homozygous genotypes that were more susceptible to prion disease and thus potentially a tell-tale of a major prion pandemic that affected humans of or younger than reproductive age far in the past and disproportionately killed before they could reproduce those with homozygous genotypes at codon 129.

If a disease was indeed responsible for the end-Pleistocene extinctions, then there are several criteria it must satisfy (see Table 7.3 in MacPhee & Marx 1997). First, the pathogen must have a stable carrier state in a reservoir species. That is, it must be able to sustain itself in the environment when there are no susceptible hosts available to infect. Second, the pathogen must have a high infection rate, such that it is able to infect virtually all individuals of all ages and sexes encountered. Third, it must be extremely lethal, with a mortality rate of c. 50–75%. Finally, it must have the ability to infect multiple host species without posing a serious threat to humans. Humans may be infected, but the disease must not be highly lethal or able to cause an epidemic.

As with other hypotheses, a number of counterarguments to the hyperdisease hypothesis have been put forth. Generally speaking, disease has to be very virulent to kill off all the individuals in a genus or species. Even such a virulent disease as West Nile fever is unlikely to have caused extinction. The disease would need to be implausibly selective while being simultaneously implausibly broad. Such a disease needs to be capable of killing off wolves such as Canis dirus or goats such as Oreamnos harringtoni while leaving other very similar species (Canis lupus and Oreamnos americanus, respectively) unaffected. It would need to be capable of killing off flightless birds while leaving closely related flighted species unaffected. Yet while remaining sufficiently selective to afflict only individual species within genera it must be capable of fatally infecting across such clades as birds, marsupials, placentals, testudines, and crocodilians. No disease with such a broad scope of fatal infectivity is known, much less one that remains simultaneously incapable of infecting numerous closely related species within those disparate clades. On the other hand, this objection does not account for the possibility of a variety of different diseases being introduced around the same era. Numerous species including wolves, mammoths, camelids, and horses had emigrated continually between Asia and North America over the past 100,000 years. For the disease hypothesis to be applicable there it would require that the population remain immunologically naive despite this constant transmission of genetic and pathogenic material. The dog-specific hypothesis in particular cannot account for several major extinction events, notably the Americas (for reasons already covered) and Australia. Dogs did not arrive in Australia until approximately 35,000 years after the first humans arrived there, and approximately 30,000 years after the Australian megafaunal extinction was complete.

==== Geomagnetic field weakening ====
Around 41,500 years ago, the Earth's magnetic field weakened in an event known as the Laschamp event. This weakening may have caused increased flux of UV-B radiation and has been suggested by a few authors as a cause of megafaunal extinctions in the Late Quaternary. The full effects of such events on the biosphere are poorly understood, however these explanations have been criticized as they do not account for the population bottlenecks seen in many megafaunal species and nor is there evidence for extreme radio-isotopic changes during the event. Considering these factors, causation is unlikely.

== Effects ==
The extinction of the megafauna has been argued by some authors to have caused disappearance of the mammoth steppe rather than the other way around. Alaska now has low nutrient soil unable to support bison, mammoths, and horses. R. Dale Guthrie has claimed this as a cause of the extinction of the megafauna there; however, he may be interpreting it backwards. The loss of large herbivores to break up the permafrost allows the cold soils that are unable to support large herbivores today. Today, in the arctic, where trucks have broken the permafrost, grasses and diverse flora and fauna can be supported. In addition, Chapin (Chapin 1980) showed that simply adding fertilizer to the soil in Alaska could make grasses grow again like they did in the era of the mammoth steppe. Possibly, the extinction of the megafauna and the corresponding loss of dung is what led to low nutrient levels in modern-day soil and therefore is why the landscape can no longer support megafauna.

Vegetation types at the time of Last Glacial Maximum. The steppe-tundra, also known as mammoth steppe, was once the Earth's most extensive biome.

However, more recent authors have viewed it as more likely that the collapse of the mammoth steppe was driven by climatic warming, which in turn impacted the megafauna, rather than the other way around. On the other hand, Pleistocene Park, a reintroduction project in Sakha Republic, Siberia aiming at recreating the mammoth steppe locally, has shown that current large herbivores such as horses, muskoxen and bison can influence vegetation and maintain productive grassland ecosystems at a local scale under the current climate.

Megafauna play a significant role in the lateral transport of mineral nutrients in an ecosystem, tending to translocate them from areas of high to those of lower abundance. They do so by their movement between the time they consume the nutrient and the time they release it through elimination (or, to a much lesser extent, through decomposition after death). In South America's Amazon Basin, it is estimated that such lateral diffusion was reduced over 98% following the megafaunal extinctions that occurred roughly 12,500 years ago. Given that phosphorus availability is thought to limit productivity in much of the region, the decrease in its transport from the western part of the basin and from floodplains (both of which derive their supply from the uplift of the Andes) to other areas is thought to have significantly impacted the region's ecology, and the effects may not yet have reached their limits. The extinction of the mammoths allowed grasslands they had maintained through grazing habits to become birch forests. The new forest and the resulting forest fires may have induced climate change. Such disappearances might be the result of the proliferation of modern humans.

Large populations of megaherbivores have the potential to contribute greatly to the atmospheric concentration of methane, which is an important greenhouse gas. Modern ruminant herbivores produce methane as a byproduct of foregut fermentation in digestion, and release it through belching or flatulence. Today, around 20% of annual methane emissions come from livestock methane release. In the Mesozoic, it has been estimated that sauropods could have emitted 520 million tons of methane to the atmosphere annually, contributing to the warmer climate of the time (up to 10 °C warmer than at present). This large emission follows from the enormous estimated biomass of sauropods, and because methane production of individual herbivores is believed to be almost proportional to their mass.

Recent studies have indicated that the extinction of megafaunal herbivores may have caused a reduction in atmospheric methane. One study examined the methane emissions from the bison that occupied the Great Plains of North America before contact with European settlers. The study estimated that the removal of the bison caused a decrease of as much as 2.2 million tons per year. Another study examined the change in the methane concentration in the atmosphere at the end of the Pleistocene epoch after the extinction of megafauna in the Americas. After early humans migrated to the Americas about 13,000 BP, their hunting and other associated ecological impacts led to the extinction of many megafaunal species there. Calculations suggest that this extinction decreased methane production by about 9.6 million tons per year. This suggests that the absence of megafaunal methane emissions may have contributed to the abrupt climatic cooling at the onset of the Younger Dryas. The decrease in atmospheric methane that occurred at that time, as recorded in ice cores, was 2–4 times more rapid than any other decrease in the last half million years, suggesting that an unusual mechanism was at work.

The extermination of megafauna left many niches vacant, which has been cited as an explanation for the vulnerability and fragility of many ecosystems to destruction in the later Holocene extinction. The comparative lack of megafauna in modern ecosystems has reduced high-order interactions among surviving species, reducing ecological complexity. This depauperate, post-megafaunal ecological state has been associated with diminished ecological resilience to stressors. Many extant species of plants have adaptations that were advantageous in the presence of megafauna but are now useless in their absence. The demise of megafaunal ecosystem engineers in the Arctic that maintained open grassland environments has been highly detrimental to shorebirds of the genus Numenius.

== Relationship to later extinctions ==
There is no general agreement on where the Quaternary extinction event ends, and the Holocene, or anthropogenic, extinction begins, or if they should be considered separate events at all. Some authors have argued that the activities of earlier archaic humans have also resulted in extinctions, though the evidence for this is equivocal.

This hypothesis is supported by rapid megafaunal extinction following recent human colonisation in Australia, New Zealand and Madagascar, in a similar way that any large, adaptable predator moving into a new ecosystem would. In many cases, it is suggested even minimal hunting pressure was enough to wipe out large fauna, particularly on geographically isolated islands. Only during the most recent parts of the extinction have plants also suffered large losses.

== See also ==
- Australian megafauna – Large animals in Australia, past and present era
- Holocene extinction – Ongoing extinction event caused by human activity
- Late Quaternary prehistoric birds – Extinct bird species
- List of Ice Age species preserved as permafrost mummies
- Megafauna – Large animals
- Pleistocene rewilding – Ecological practice
- Toba catastrophe theory – Volcanic supereruption 74,000 years ago in Indonesia
