= Ursus praekudarensis =

Ursus praekudarensis Temporal range: Middle Pleistocene

Scientific classification
- Kingdom: Animalia
- Phylum: Chordata
- Class: Mammalia
- Order: Carnivora
- Family: Ursidae
- Genus: Ursus
- Species: †U. praekudarensis

Binomial name
- †Ursus praekudarensis Baryshnikov, 1998

Extinct species of bear

Ursus praekudarensis is an extinct species of Ursus that lived during the Middle Pleistocene.

== Taxonomy ==
U. praekudarensis has been considered by some authors to be a subspecies of Ursus kudarensis.

== Palaeoecology ==
In the Caucasus Mountains, U. praekudarensis competed with Hystrix cf. refossa and with Malayan porcupines for herbivore resources.
