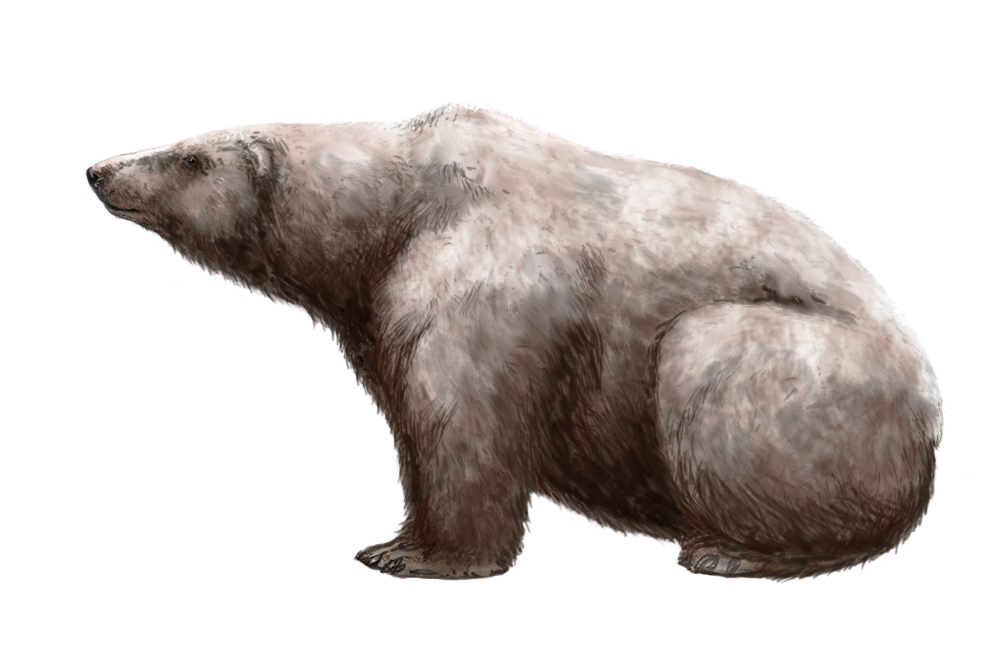
- Hypothetical restoration

Scientific classification
- Kingdom: Animalia
- Phylum: Chordata
- Class: Mammalia
- Order: Carnivora
- Family: Ursidae
- Genus: Ursus
- Species: U. maritimus
- Subspecies: †U. m. tyrannus

Trinomial name
- †Ursus maritimus tyrannus Kurtén, 1964

Synonyms
- Ursus arctos tyrannus; Ursus tyrannus

= Ursus maritimus tyrannus =

Tyrant polar bear Temporal range: Late Pleistocene, Weichselian, 0.115–0.070 Ma

Extinct subspecies of carnivore

The tyrant polar bear (Ursus maritimus tyrannus, meaning "tyrant marine bear"), also known as the Kew Bridge bear, is an extinct subspecies of polar bear that lived during the Late Pleistocene, and whose exact taxonomic position remains a matter of debate.

== Discovery ==
The subspecies of polar bear was named by the Finnish paleontologist Björn Kurtén in 1964, based on a single fragmentary right ulna found in the gravels of the Thames at Kew Bridge, London. The fossil was also discovered alongside steppe bison (Bison priscus), reindeer (Rangifer tarandus) and wolves (Canis lupus).

The ulna was considered to be the earliest representative of the polar bear lineage until the discovery of a mandible from Poolepynten, Svalbard which was dated to approximately 130–110 ka (Eemian Interglacial).

== Taxonomy ==
Initially, Kurtén defined the ulna as belonging to no other bear species than Ursus maritimus. At the time of the discovery, it was the largest ursine ulna ever found, leaving only two options for species classification: either famously long-legged Pleistocene Tremarctines or the polar bear. Since no Arctodus bear lived in Pleistocene Britain, Ursus maritimus was chosen as a parent taxon.

According to Kurten, besides the size itself, ulna has exhibited several maritimus-like morphological characteristics:

- Nearly-straight shape of the dorsal margin (compared to concave shape found in cave bear and U. deningeri and somewhat concave in U. arctos).
- Olecranon shape more closely resembling U. maritimus than any other species.
- In its middle part, the semilunar notch of the holotype ulna merges with the medial side, as common in U. maritimus. In the case of brown bear ulnae, the boundary is pronounced.
- The shaft tapers very gradually while in brown bear the taper is more noticeable.

Furthermore, he conducted a numerical analysis, comparing measurements the ulnae of the several bear species. Kurten concluded that while being common in polar bears, in brown bears (both extinct and extant) the dimensions exceeding 400 mm (16 in) are extremely rare.

In his 1971 work, T.H. Manning supported Kurten's proposal of placing the Kew Bridge specimen as a subspecies of polar bear, stating that the large size of the ulna is enough to distinguish U. m. tyrannus from the extant populations.

Ulnae of U. maritimus tyrannus, a polar and a brown bear.

In 2008, Charles Harington stated that the identification of a polar bear is plausible based on sea level changes and ice conditions in the North Sea of that period. Furthermore, he highlighted the presence of marine mammal fauna (including ringed and bearded seals) near the Kew locality, suggesting that polar bears were also present in the southern North Sea during colder periods of the Weichselian.

However, Harington also noted that Andy Currant of the Natural History Museum, London believes that the fossil represents a huge brown bear rather than a polar bear, as faunal assemblages from other contemporary British sites, also dominated by steppe bison, reindeer and wolves, contain gigantic brown bears like the Kew Bridge bear.

Andy Currant's opinion that the Kew Bridge fossil belongs to a brown bear, although referred to in a 2007 BBC interview and in studies from 2009 and 2022, awaits scientific verification. The reasoning behind his classification is based on the assumption that U. m. tyrannus was a "running bear", in contrast to stalking and ambush-heavy hunting strategies more typical of polar bears. Nevertheless, Currant notes that in order to definitively distinguish a polar bear from a brown bear, cranial or mandibular material is required.

== Evolution ==
Both polar and brown bears belong to genus Ursus, together with Asian and American black bears, as well as several fossil species that include the cave bear complex. Within the genus, polar and brown bears form a closely related grouping since both groups share the same origin, with most recent genomic studies indicating that polar bear lineage has diverged from brown bears approximately 400,000-600,000 years ago. Being dated as early Weichselian fossil, the Kew Bridge specimen lived well after the divergence event.

Multiple hybridisation events between polar and brown bears occurred during the Late Pleistocene and Holocene epochs, with the modern polar bear population sharing a matriline with brown bears that occupied a range close to Ireland during the Last Ice Age. This suggests that those two species had overlapping distributions in Pleistocene Northwestern Europe and may have occupied similar ecological niches.

== Description ==
The specimen is interpreted to represent a relatively large individual, evidently a subadult due to missing distal epiphysis, seemingly a male. The ulna is estimated to have been 48.5 cm (19 in) long when complete—for comparison, modern subadult polar bear ulnae are 36–43 cm (14–17 in) long. The ulna was dated to the early Weichselian of the Late Pleistocene (c. 70 ka). Of the 16 specimens identified as Pleistocene polar bears, this is the only fossil ascribed to this subspecies.

Based on the series of measurements of eight polar bears' skulls and eight corresponding ulnae, a Reduced Major Axis analysis was conducted that extrapolates the size of a Kew Bridge bear's condylobasal length (complete skull length) to 447 mm (17.6 in). That makes U. m. tyrannus skull 11 mm (0.43 in) longer than the biggest polar bear skull ever recorded (the 436 mm (17.2 in) USNM 83594 skull collected from St. Paul Island, Alaska), both extinct and extant. Nevertheless, given the limited and unrepresentative sample size, these calculations should be considered highly tentative.

Guinness World Records estimates that tyrant polar bear was 1.83 m (6.0 ft) high at the shoulder, measured 3.7 m (12 ft) in length and had a body mass around 1,000 kg (2,200 lb). However, those measurements are highly tentative and speculative since no peer-review paleontological studies were conducted to verify or disprove these dimensions.

== See also ==
- Polar bear
- Ursus kudarensis
- Steppe brown bear
