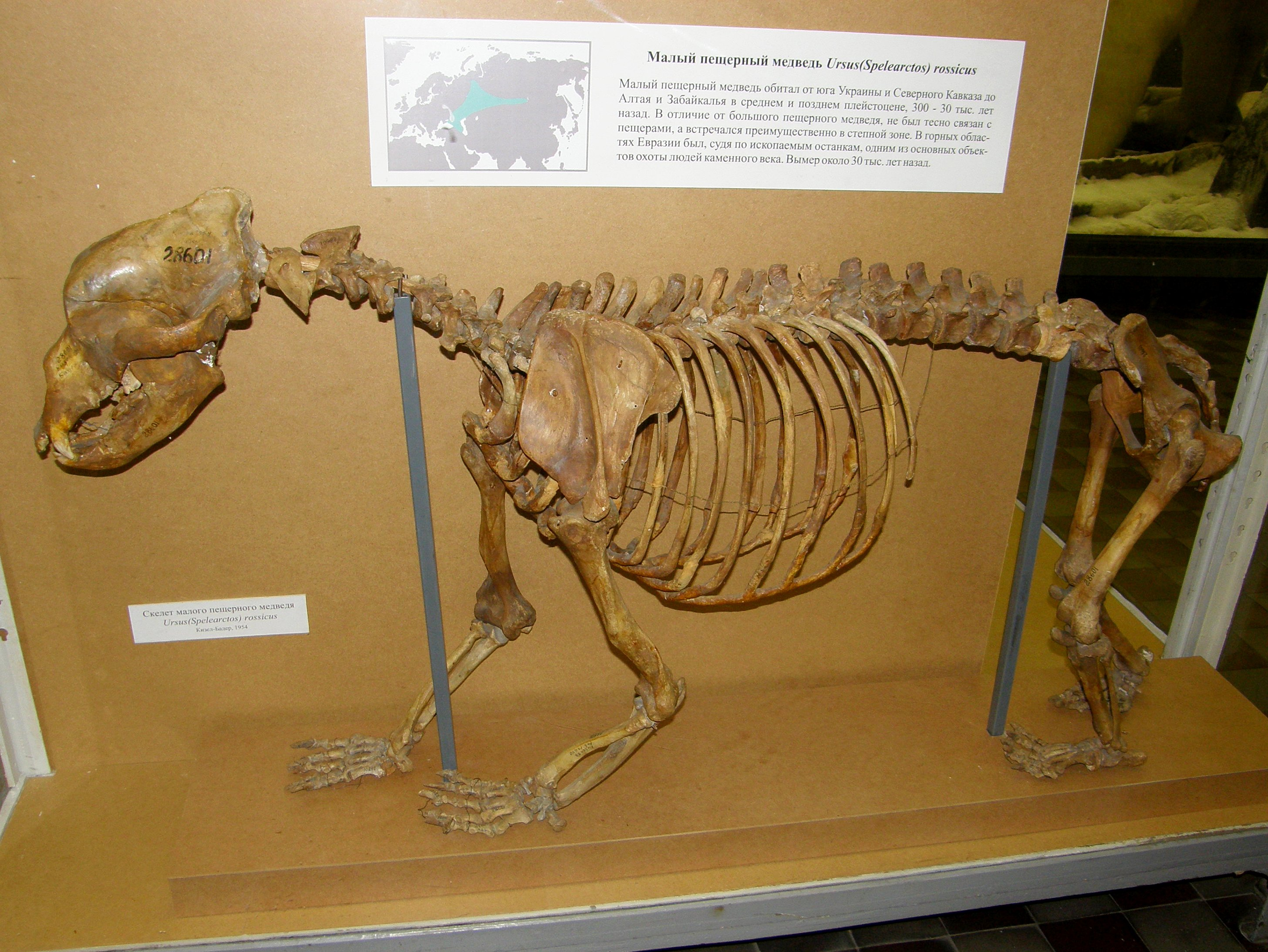
- Skeleton in Zoological Museum, Saint Petersburg

Scientific classification
- Kingdom: Animalia
- Phylum: Chordata
- Class: Mammalia
- Order: Carnivora
- Family: Ursidae
- Genus: Ursus
- Species: †U. rossicus

Binomial name
- †Ursus rossicus Borissiak, 1930

= Ursus rossicus =

Ursus rossicus Temporal range: Middle to Late Pleistocene, 0.25–0.027 Ma

Extinct species of carnivore

Ursus rossicus is an extinct species of bear that lived in the steppe regions of northern Eurasia and Siberia during the Pleistocene. It is part of the cave bear species complex.

== Discovery ==
Vereshchagin discovered the first U. rossicus remains in the Altai Mountains in 1973. Mandibles of the bear were found in Bachatsk Quarry, Krasni Yar (in Tomsk Province) and Mokhovo Quarry; skull fragments were found in Krasni Yar. More fossil remains of U. rossicus were discovered in the famous Denisova Cave.

== Description ==
The small cave bear had a very broad, domed skull with a steep forehead. Its stout body had long thighs, massive shins, and in-turning feet, making it similar in skeletal structure to the brown bear. Cave bears were comparable in size to the largest modern-day bears.

== Diet ==
U. rossicus dental specimens when separated into groups of different ontogenetic stages do not show significant variations in dental microwear, suggesting the diets of these bears stayed fairly constant over the course of their lifetimes. The microwear features of the labial surfaces of its incisors suggest that U. rossicus had a diet of coarse, dry vegetation and frequently engaged in rhizophagy.

Cave bear teeth show greater wear than most modern bear species, suggesting a diet of tough materials. However, tubers and other gritty food, which cause distinctive tooth wear in modern brown bears, do not appear to have constituted a major part of cave bears' diets on the basis of dental microwear analysis.

The morphological features of the cave bear chewing apparatus, including loss of premolars, have long been suggested to indicate their diets displayed a higher degree of herbivory than the Eurasian brown bear. Indeed, a solely vegetarian diet has been inferred on the basis of tooth morphology. Results obtained on the stable isotopes of cave bear bones also point to a largely vegetarian diet in having low levels of nitrogen-15 and carbon-13, which are accumulated at a faster rate by carnivores as opposed to herbivores.

Cave bears of the last ice age lacked the usual two or three premolars present in other bears; to compensate, the last molar is very elongated, with supplementary cusps.
