= Ursus kanivetz =

Scientific classification
- Kingdom: Animalia
- Phylum: Chordata
- Class: Mammalia
- Order: Carnivora
- Family: Ursidae
- Subfamily: Ursinae
- Genus: Ursus
- Species: U. kanivetz

Binomial name
- Ursus kanivetz Vereshchagin, 1973

Ursus kanivetz was a species of the genus Ursus from the Pleistocene epoch. It lived in the Ural Mountains.

== See also ==
- Cave bear
- Brown bear
