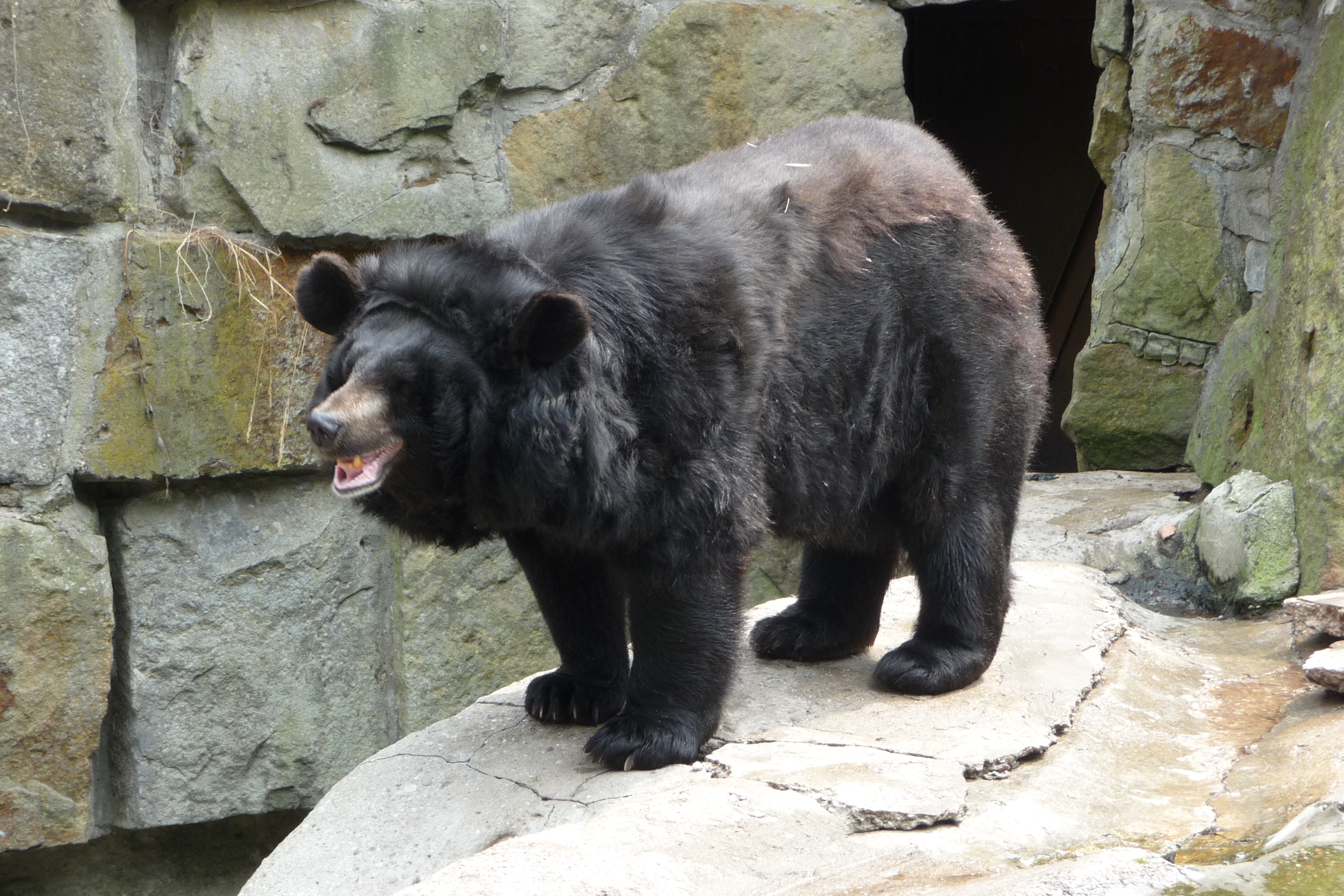

Scientific classification
- Kingdom: Animalia
- Phylum: Chordata
- Class: Mammalia
- Order: Carnivora
- Family: Ursidae
- Genus: Ursus
- Species: U. thibetanus
- Subspecies: U. t. ussuricus

Trinomial name
- Ursus thibetanus ussuricus Heude, 1901

Synonyms
- Selenarctos thibetanus ussuricus

= Ussuri black bear =

Subspecies of carnivore

The Ussuri black bear (Ursus thibetanus ussuricus), also known as the Manchurian black bear, is a large subspecies of the Asian black bear native to the Russian Far East, Northeast China and the Korean Peninsula. The subspecies is named after the Ussuri River. It is the largest subspecies of the Asiatic black bear.

== Taxonomy ==
Ussuri black bear is a subspecies of Asian black bear. The subspecies is named after the Ussuri River. It is the largest subspecies of the Asiatic black bear.

== Distribution and habitat ==
The Ussuri black bear is native to the Russian Far East, Northeast China and the Korean Peninsula. It is present in Southern Siberia in Russia, northeastern China, and mountains in the Korean peninsula. Its habitats include broad-leaved forests in Russia and coniferous forests in northeast. The whole species is classified as Vulnerable by the IUCN, which makes no classification distinctions for subspecies in this case. The bears are affected by habitat loss, and poaching for their internal organs such as gall bladder and bile. South Korea designated the subspecies as a natural monument species in 1982 and as an endangered species in 2005. It is also protected under the National Protection Wildlife Law in China.

== Morphology ==
The Ussuri black bears have a black fur with a white colored collar. Males typically weigh up to 200 kg (440 lb), with females weighing up to 140 kg (310 lb). Males measure about 150–200 cm (59–79 in) in length. It has thinner and shorter limbs, with the powerful hind legs. It has a smaller head with an elongated snout, powerful jaws, and larger ears compared to the other subspecies. The fur is thinner in summer, and becomes thicker in winter.

== Behaviour ==
The Ussuri black bears have a life expectancy of 20 to 25 years in the wild. It can live up to 30 years in captivity. They are omnivorous and feed on a variety of food. The bears food include fruits and nuts, grains, small insects such as termites, eggs of birds, honey, and small invertebrates. They also feed on carrion left behind by other animals. Sympatric predators of the black bear include the Ussuri brown bear and Siberian tiger.

They have been found to be usually nocturnal near human habitations, while being active during the day in other areas. During the day, they often spend time on short trees, or rock platforms. They are known to be aggressive when confronted by humans. They live a solitary life except during the time of mating. The mating season occurs in June and July and the bear often produces a litter with a maximum of four cubs. Cubs are weaned off after eighteen months. It spends the winter months hibernating in dens.
