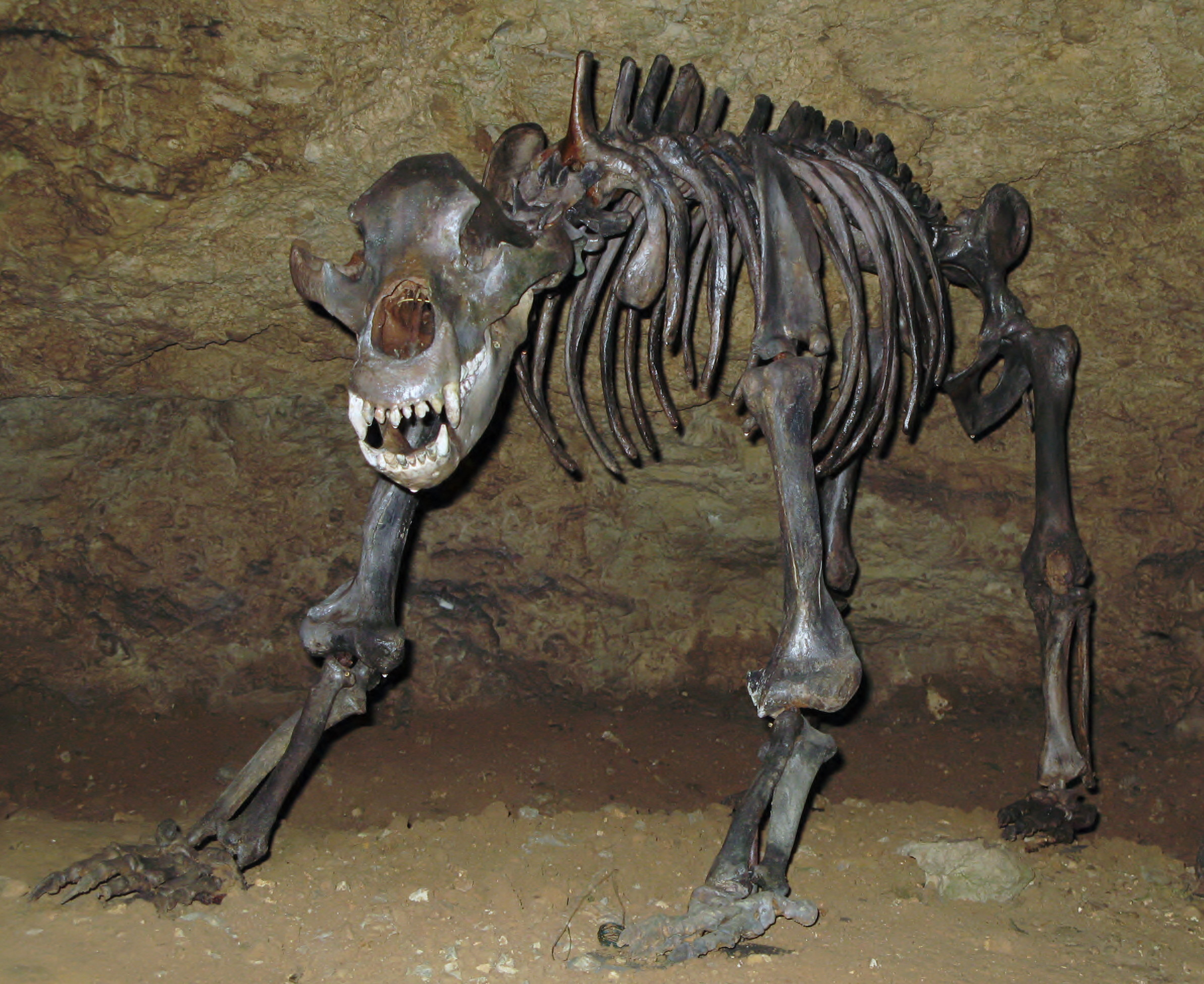
- Mounted cave bear skeleton at Devil's Cave, Germany

Scientific classification
- Kingdom: Animalia
- Phylum: Chordata
- Class: Mammalia
- Order: Carnivora
- Family: Ursidae
- Genus: Ursus
- Species: †U. spelaeus

Binomial name
- †Ursus spelaeus Rosenmüller, 1794

= Cave bear =

Cave bear Temporal range: Middle to Late Pleistocene, 0.25–0.024 Ma

Extinct species of carnivore

The cave bear (Ursus spelaeus) is a prehistoric species of bear that lived in Europe and Asia during the Pleistocene and became extinct about 24,000 years ago during the Last Glacial Maximum.

The common and scientific name for the species comes from their remains having been found largely in caves. This reflects the views of experts that cave bears spent more time in caves than the brown bear, frequently using them to hibernate during the winter months. Unlike brown bears, cave bears are thought to have been almost entirely or exclusively herbivorous.

Cave bears exhibit a great degree of size, morphological and genetic variability, and Late Pleistocene cave bears are often (though not universally) considered to be species complex of up to six different species.

== Taxonomy ==
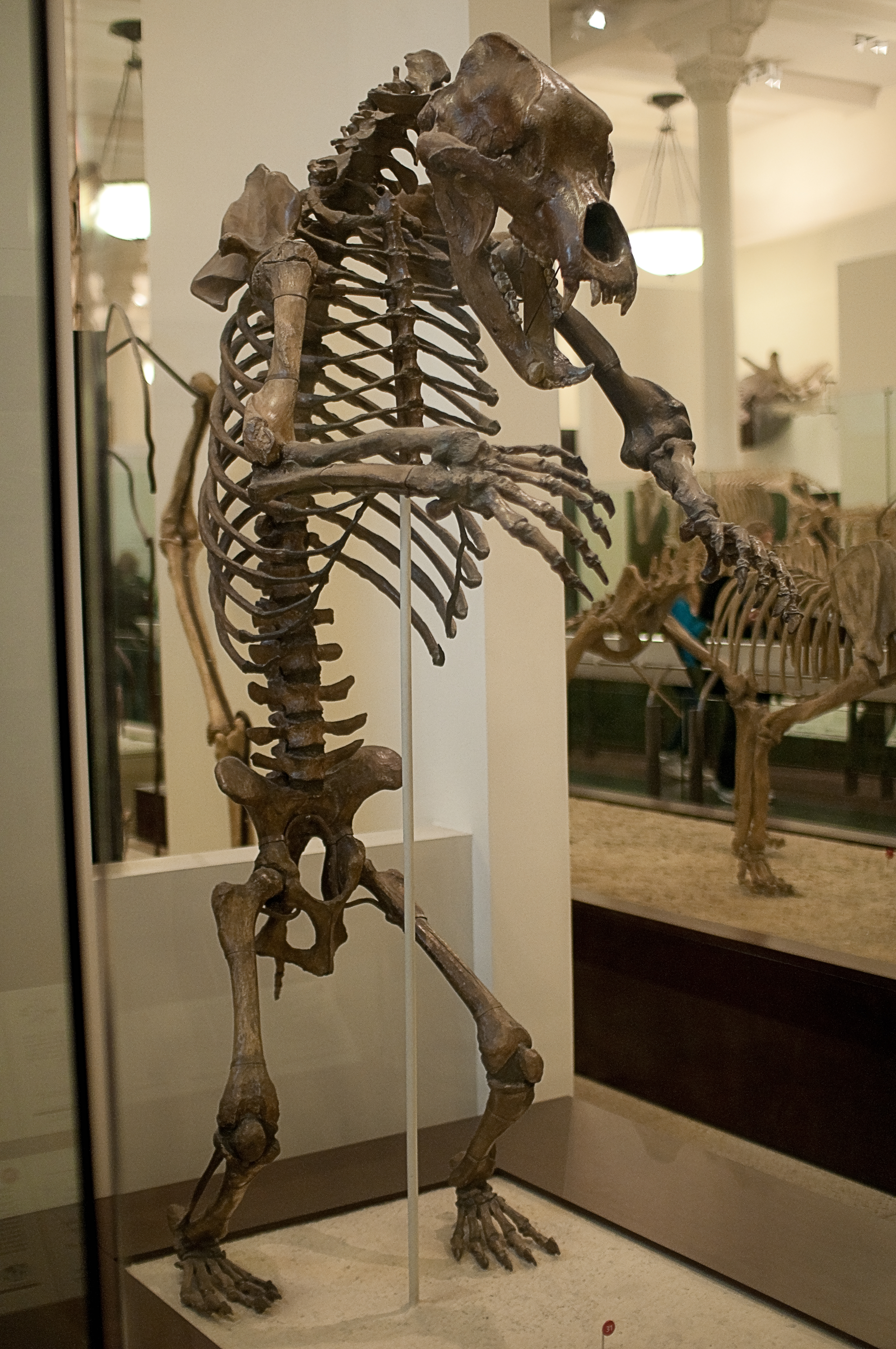
Rearing Ursus spelaeus skeleton at the AMNH

Cave bear skeletons were first described in 1774 by Johann Friedrich Esper, in his book Newly Discovered Zoolites of Unknown Four Footed Animals. While scientists at the time considered that the skeletons could belong to apes, canids, felids, or even dragons or unicorns, Esper postulated that they actually belonged to polar bears. Twenty years later, Johann Christian Rosenmüller, an anatomist at Leipzig University, gave the species its binomial name. The bones were so numerous that most researchers had little regard for them. During World War I, with the scarcity of phosphate dung, earth from the caves where cave bear bones occurred was used as a source of phosphates. When the "dragon caves" in Austria’s Styria region were exploited for this purpose, only the skulls and leg bones were kept.

Many caves in Central Europe have skeletons of cave bears inside, such as the Heinrichshöhle in Hemer and the Dechenhöhle in Iserlohn, Germany. A complete skeleton, five complete skulls, and 18 other bones were found inside Kletno Bear Cave, in 1966 in Poland. In Romania, in a cave called Bears' Cave, 140 cave bear skeletons were discovered in 1983.

Remains assigned to "cave bears" sensu lato from the Late Pleistocene exhibit a strong degree of morphological and size variability, and have often been assigned to their own species, including Ursus rossicus (Eastern Europe, Central Asia and Siberia), Ursus ingressus (Central Europe to the Urals), Ursus kanivetz, (Urals) Ursus kudarensis (the Caucasus), Ursus eremus (Central Europe, possibly a subspecies of U. spelaeus s.s.) and Ursus spelaeus sensu stricto (Western, Central and Southeast Europe). These populations/species show considerable genetic divergence from each other, (with genetic divergences estimated at hundreds of thousands to a million years) though whether these species should be regarded as synonyms of U. spelaeus is debated.

=== Evolution ===
Both the cave bear and the brown bear are thought to be descended from the Early Pleistocene species Ursus etruscus. The date of divergence between the ancestors of cave bears and brown bears has been estimated at around 1.2–1.5 million years ago. The earliest remains of the cave bear lineage are assigned to the species Ursus deningeri (sometimes called Deninger's bear), which first appears in the fossil record at the end of the Early Pleistocene, around 1.2-0.8 million years ago. U. deningeri is known from remains spanning from Europe to China. The transition between Ursus deningeri and Ursus spelaeus is often given as the Last Interglacial (130-115,000 years ago), although the boundary between these forms is arbitrary, and intermediate or transitional taxa have been proposed, e.g. Ursus spelaeus deningeroides, while other authorities consider both taxa to be chronological variants of the same species.

Cave bears found anywhere will vary in age, thus facilitating investigations into evolutionary trends. The three anterior premolars were gradually reduced, then disappeared, possibly in response to a largely vegetarian diet. In a fourth of the skulls found in the Conturines cave in Italy, the third premolar is still present, while more derived specimens elsewhere lack it. The last remaining premolar became conjugated with the true molars, enlarging the crown and granting it more cusps and cutting borders. This phenomenon, called molarization, improved the mastication capacities of the molars, facilitating the processing of tough vegetation. This allowed the cave bear to gain more energy for hibernation, while eating less than its ancestors.

In 2005, scientists recovered and sequenced the nuclear DNA of a cave bear that lived between 42,000 and 44,000 years ago. The procedure used genomic DNA extracted from one of the animal's teeth. Sequencing the DNA directly (rather than first replicating it with the polymerase chain reaction), the scientists recovered 21 cave bear genes from remains that did not yield significant amounts of DNA with traditional techniques. This study confirmed and built on results from a previous study using mitochondrial DNA extracted from cave bear remains ranging from 20,000 to 130,000 years old. Both show that the cave bear was more closely related to the brown bear and polar bear than it was to the American black bear, but had split from the brown bear lineage before the distinct eastern and western brown bear lineages diversified, and before the split of brown bears and polar bears. However, a recent study showed that both species had some hybridization between them.

== Description ==
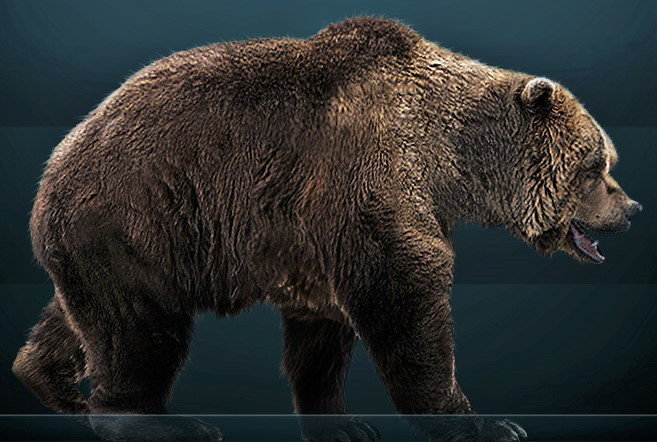
Life restoration.

The cave bear had a very broad, domed skull with a steep forehead; its stout body had long thighs, massive shins and in-turning feet, making it similar in skeletal structure to the brown bear. Cave bears were comparable in size to, or larger than, the largest modern-day bears, measuring up to 2 m (6.6 ft) in length. The average weight for males was 350 to 600 kg (770 to 1,320 lb), while females weighed 225 to 250 kg (495 to 550 lb). Of cave bear skeletons in museums, 90% are classified as male due to a misconception that the female skeletons were merely "dwarfs". Cave bears grew larger during glaciations and smaller during interglacials, probably to adjust heat loss rate.

The morphology of the mandible of cave bears varied depending on climate; individuals in colder, drier, and more seasonal climates possessed more slender mandibles and a dorsoventrally smaller mandibular ramus relative to individuals living in warmer and wetter conditions. Cave bears of the last Ice Age lacked the usual two or three premolars present in other bears; to compensate, the last molar is very elongated, with supplementary cusps. The humerus of the cave bear was similar in size to that of the polar bear, as were the femora of females. The femora of male cave bears, however, bore more similarities in size to those of Kodiak bears.

== Palaeobiology ==
=== Diet ===
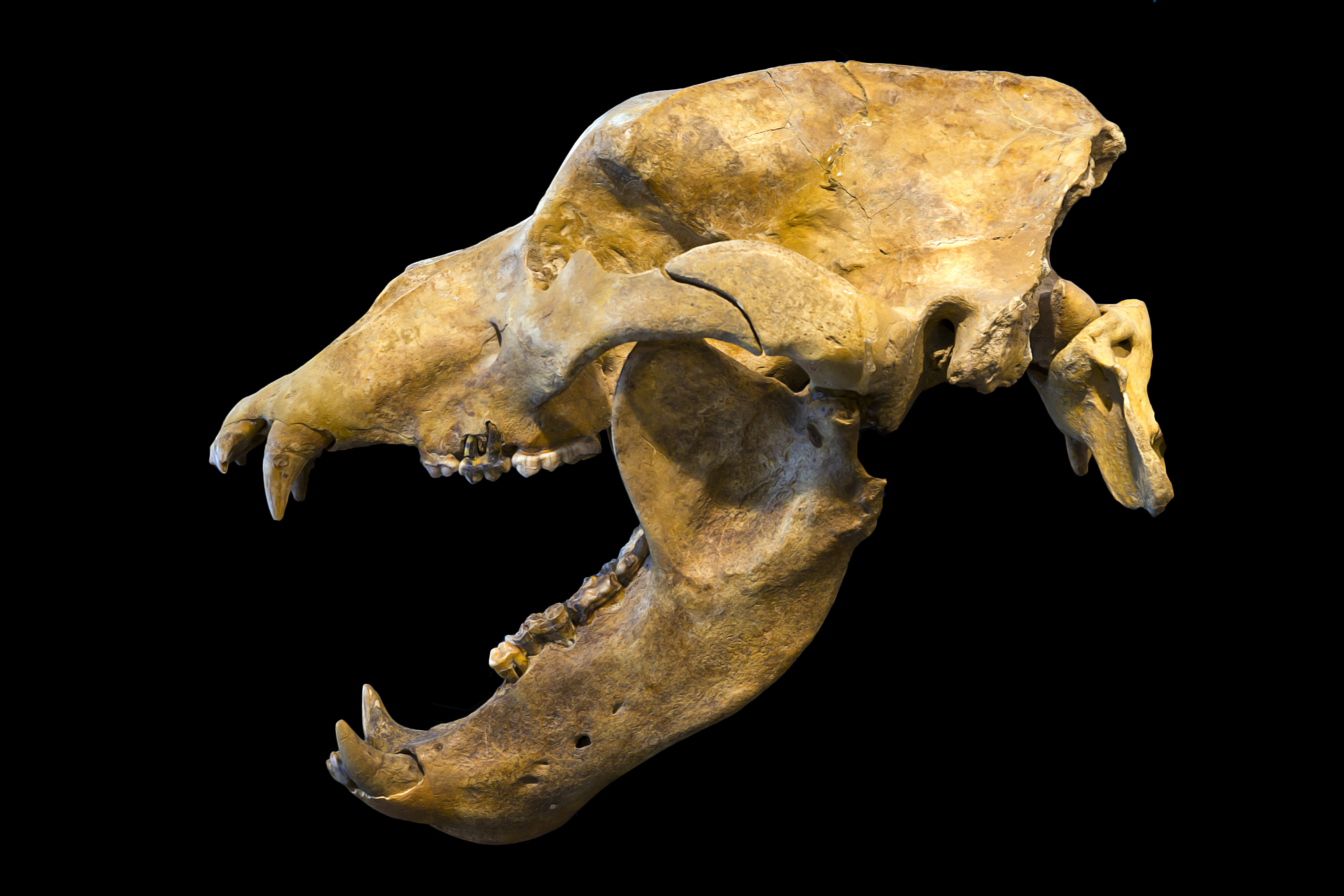
Ursus spelaeus lacked the usual two or three premolars present in other bear species.

Dental microwear indicates that cave bears exhibited very high dietary flexibility and that their foraging habits differed substantially by region, often reflecting local availability of different food items. Cave bear teeth were very large and show greater wear than most modern bear species, suggesting a diet of tough materials. However, tubers and other gritty food, which cause distinctive tooth wear in modern brown bears, do not appear to have constituted a major part of cave bears' diets on the basis of dental microwear analysis, although other studies using dental microwear texture analysis (DMTA) have shown that cave bears consumed food with textural properties not distinct from extant bear species, with the exception of the polar bear. And at least one population, from Goyet Cave in Belgium, had DMTA values indicating a diet entirely composed of soft foods. Seed fruits are documented to have been consumed by cave bears. Cave bear dental microwear from the high altitude site of Ramesch-Knochenhöhle in the Totes Gebirge indicates that some cave bears living in mountains ingested large amounts of sand as a result of feeding on alpine vegetation. The results from Ramesch-Knochenhöhle also indicate two very distinct patterns of microwear among the same subspecies, which may potentially reflect differences in feeding behaviour between male and female cave bears. Cave bears primarily relied on C_{3} plants and primary foraged in forest environments, although their values exhibited a greater range than either Deninger's bears or brown bears.

The morphological features of the cave bear chewing apparatus, including loss of premolars, have long been suggested to indicate their diets displayed a higher degree of herbivory than the Eurasian brown bear. Indeed, a solely vegetarian diet has been inferred on the basis of tooth morphology. Results obtained on the stable isotopes of cave bear bones also point to a largely vegetarian diet in having low levels of nitrogen-15 and carbon-13, which are accumulated at a faster rate by carnivores as opposed to herbivores. Among Mediterranean cave bears such as those found in Toll Cave in northeastern Spain, the particularly low δ^{15}N values may be a result of their high intake of nitrogen-fixing plants.

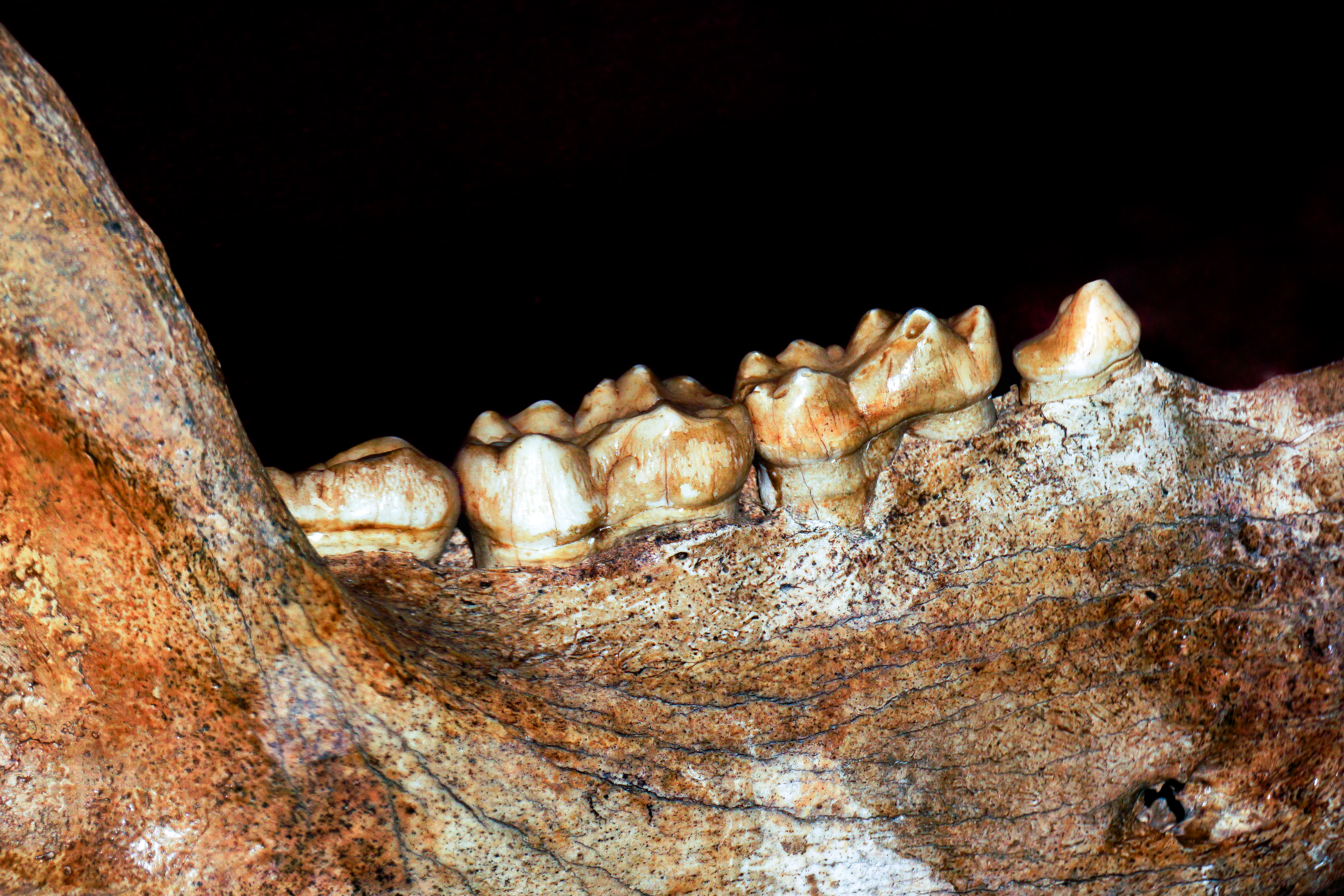
Detail of the molars of the lower jaw

However, some evidence points toward the occasional inclusion of animal protein in cave bear diets. For example, toothmarks on cave bear remains in areas where cave bears are the only recorded potential carnivores suggests occasional cannibalistic scavenging, possibly on individuals that died during hibernation, and dental microwear analysis indicates the cave bear may have fed on a greater quantity of bone than its contemporary, the smaller Eurasian brown bear. The dental microwear patterns of cave bear molars from the northeastern Iberian Peninsula show that cave bears may have consumed more meat in the days and weeks leading up to hibernation. Cave bear dental microwear from Belgium has also showed clear evidence of their omnivory during predormancy, with bone, insect, and mammal meat consumption being inferred from the microwear patterns. Comparisons of the dental microwear and macrowear of brown bears and cave bears in northern Spain found that the latter were significantly more osteophagous than the former. Additionally, cave bear remains from Peștera cu Oase in the southwestern tip of the Romanian part of the Carpathian Mountains had elevated levels of nitrogen-15 in their bones, indicative of omnivorous diets, although the values are within the range of those found for the strictly herbivorous mammoth. One stable isotopic study concluded that the degree of omnivory in cave bears was similar to that in modern brown bears.

Although the current prevailing opinion concludes that cave bears were largely herbivorous, and more so than any modern species of the genus Ursus, increasing evidence points to omnivorous diets, based both on regional variability of isotopic composition of bone remains indicative of dietary plasticity, and on a recent re-evaluation of craniodental morphology that places the cave bear squarely among omnivorous modern bear species with respect to its skull and tooth shapes.

=== Migration ===
A cave bear population from Cueva de Guantes in Spain is inferred on the basis of carbon isotope ratios in collagen and bioapatite and oxygen isotope ratios in bioapatite to have been largely non-migratory and to have had stable maternal social groups, as these isotopic signals indicate that their food and water sources experienced no change over several generations.

=== Mortality ===
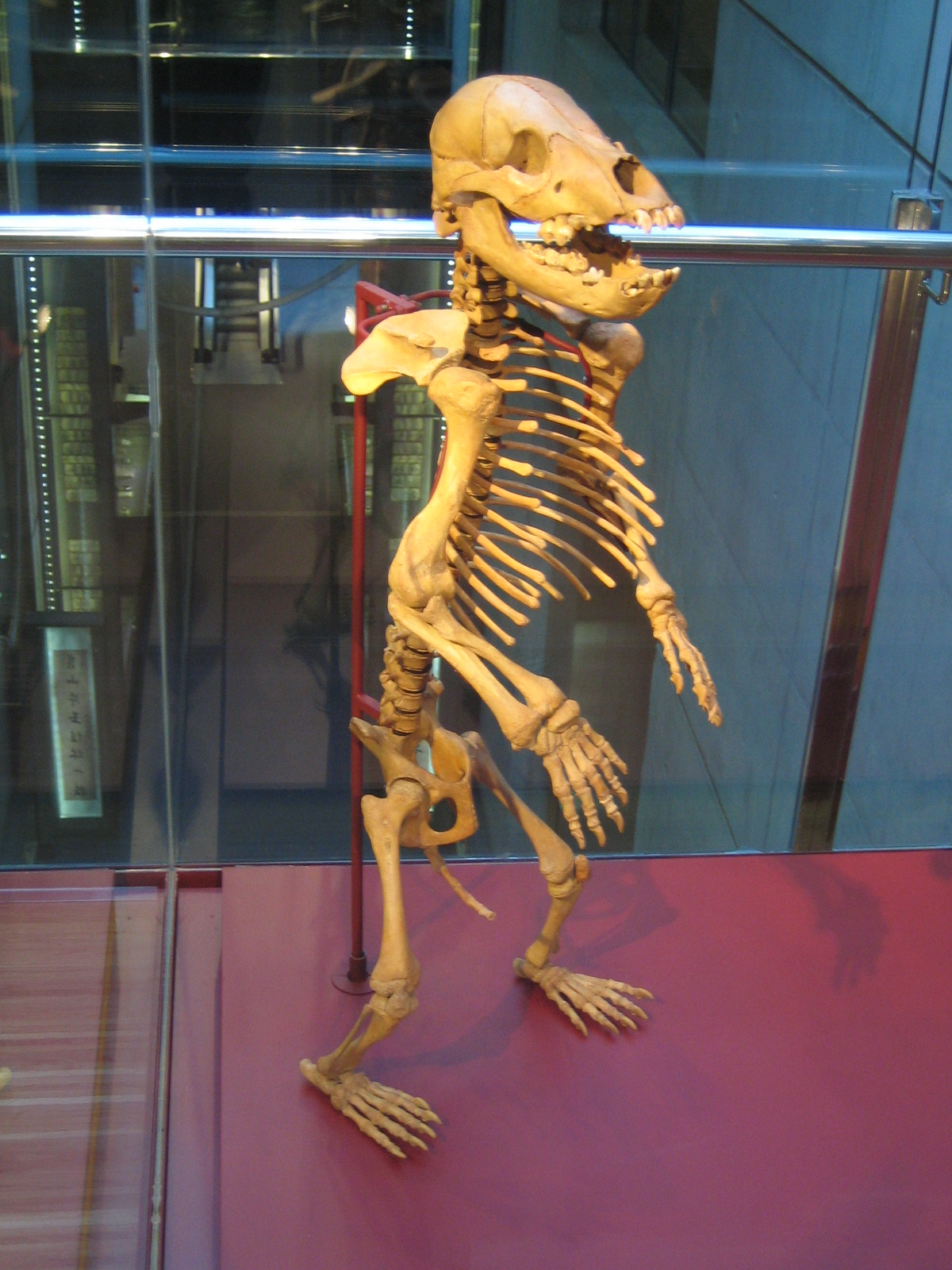
Standing skeleton of juvenile cave bear

Death during hibernation was a common end for cave bears, mainly befalling specimens that failed ecologically during the summer season through inexperience, sickness or old age. Some cave bear bones show signs of numerous ailments, including spinal fusion, bone tumours, cavities, tooth resorption, necrosis (particularly in younger specimens), osteomyelitis, periostitis, rickets and kidney stones. There is also evidence that cave bears suffered from tuberculosis. Male cave bear skeletons have been found with broken bacula, probably due to fighting during the breeding season. Cave bear longevity is unknown, though it has been estimated that they seldom exceeded twenty years of age. Paleontologists doubt adult cave bears had any natural predators, save for pack-hunting wolves and cave hyenas, which would probably have attacked sick or infirm individuals. Cave hyenas are thought to be responsible for the disarticulation and destruction of some cave bear skeletons. Such large carcasses were an optimal food resource for the hyenas, especially at the end of the winter, when food was scarce. The presence of fully articulated adult cave lion skeletons, deep in cave bear dens, indicates the lions may have occasionally entered dens to prey on hibernating cave bears, with some dying in the attempt.

== Range and habitat ==
The cave bear's range stretched across Europe; from Spain and the British Isles in the west, Belgium, Italy, parts of Germany, Poland, the Czech Republic, the Balkans, Romania, Georgia, and parts of Russia, including the Caucasus; and northern Iran. No traces of cave bears have been found in the northern British Isles, Scandinavia or the Baltic countries, which were all covered in extensive glaciers at the time. The largest numbers of cave bear remains have been found in Austria, Switzerland, northern Italy, northern Spain, southern France, and Romania, roughly corresponding with the Pyrenees, Alps, and Carpathians. The huge number of bones found in southern, central and eastern Europe has led some scientists to think Europe may have once had herds of cave bears. Others, however, point out that, though some caves have thousands of bones, they were accumulated over a period of 100,000 years or more, thus requiring only two deaths in a cave per year to account for the large numbers.

The cave bear inhabited low mountainous areas, especially in regions rich in limestone caves. They seem to have avoided open plains, preferring forested or forest-edged terrains.

== Relationship with humans ==
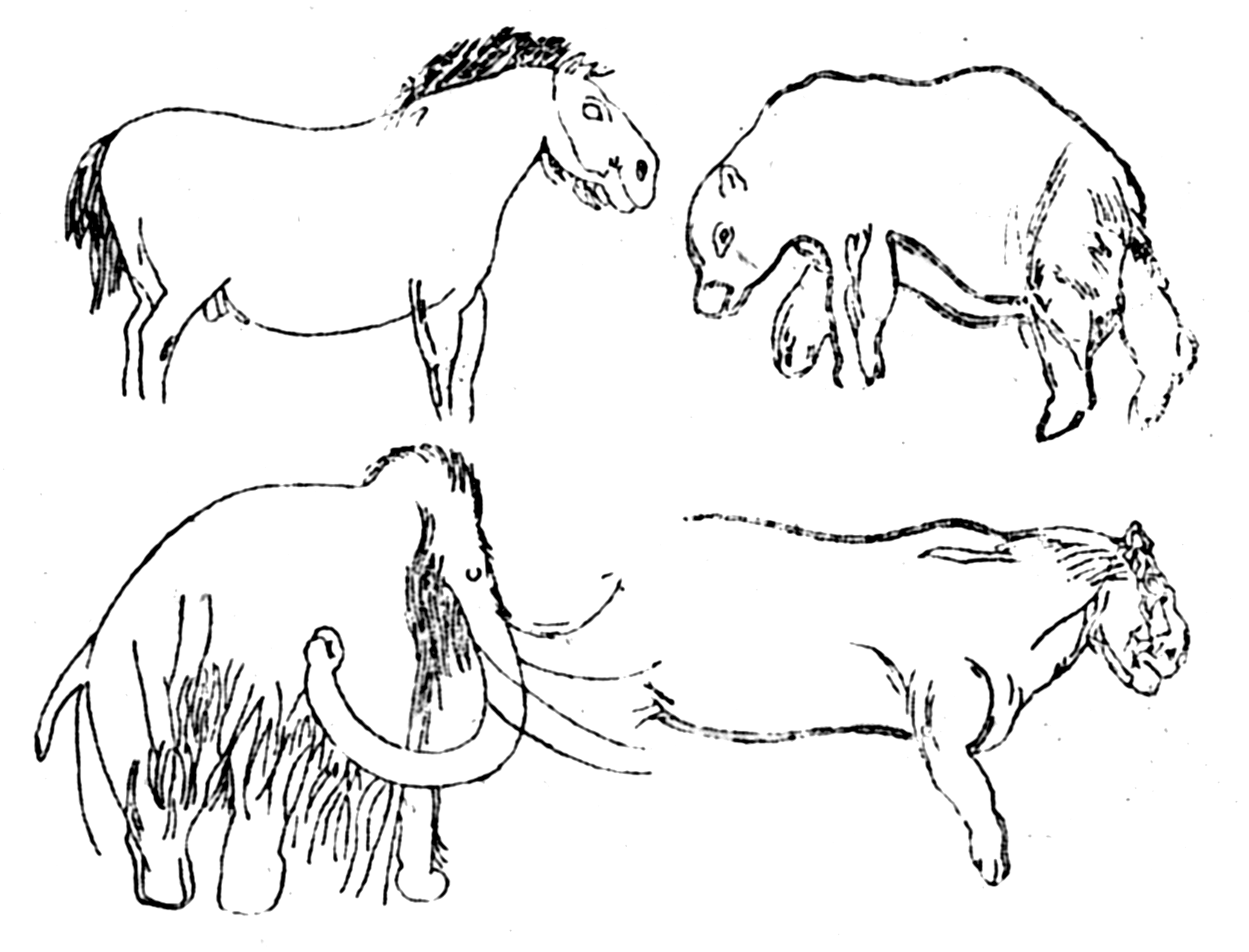
Cave bear (upper right) along with other animals depicted in rock art from the Les Combarelles cave

Cave bear and brown bear remains that are modified by Neanderthals to be used as tools have been found in various regions across Europe, indicating the exploitation of bear carcasses by Paleolithic humans. Probable evidence of Neanderthals' opportunistic hunting and/or competition against cave bears and brown bears have also been reported.

Between the years 1917 and 1923, the Drachenloch cave in Switzerland was excavated by Emil Bächler. The excavation uncovered more than 30,000 cave bear skeletons. It also uncovered a stone chest or cist, consisting of a low wall built from limestone slabs near a cave wall with a number of bear skulls inside it. A cave bear skull was also found with a femur bone from another bear stuck inside it. Scholars speculated that it was proof of prehistoric human religious rites involving the cave bear, representing a possible reverence or spiritual understanding of the animal and its importance in their lives. However, there are claims that instead Drachenloch cave bears were hunted as part of a hunting ritual, or that the skulls were kept as trophies being the appropriate explanation, disregarding the religious and spiritual aspect. In Archaeology, Religion, Ritual (2004), archaeologist Timothy Insoll strongly questions whether the Drachenloch finds in the stone cist were the result of human interaction. Insoll states that the evidence for religious practices involving cave bears in this time period is "far from convincing". Insoll also states that comparisons with the religious practices involving bears that are known from historic times are invalid.

A similar phenomenon was encountered in Regourdou, southern France. A rectangular pit contained the remains of at least twenty bears, covered by a massive stone slab. The remains of a Neanderthal lay nearby in another stone pit, with various objects, including a bear humerus, a scraper, a core, and some flakes, which were interpreted as grave offerings.

An unusual discovery in a deep chamber of Basura Cave in Savona, Italy, is thought to be related to cave bear worship, because there is a vaguely zoomorphic stalagmite surrounded by clay pellets. It is thought to have been used by Neanderthals for a ceremony; bear bones scattered on the floor further suggests it was likely to have had some sort of ritual purpose.

== Extinction ==
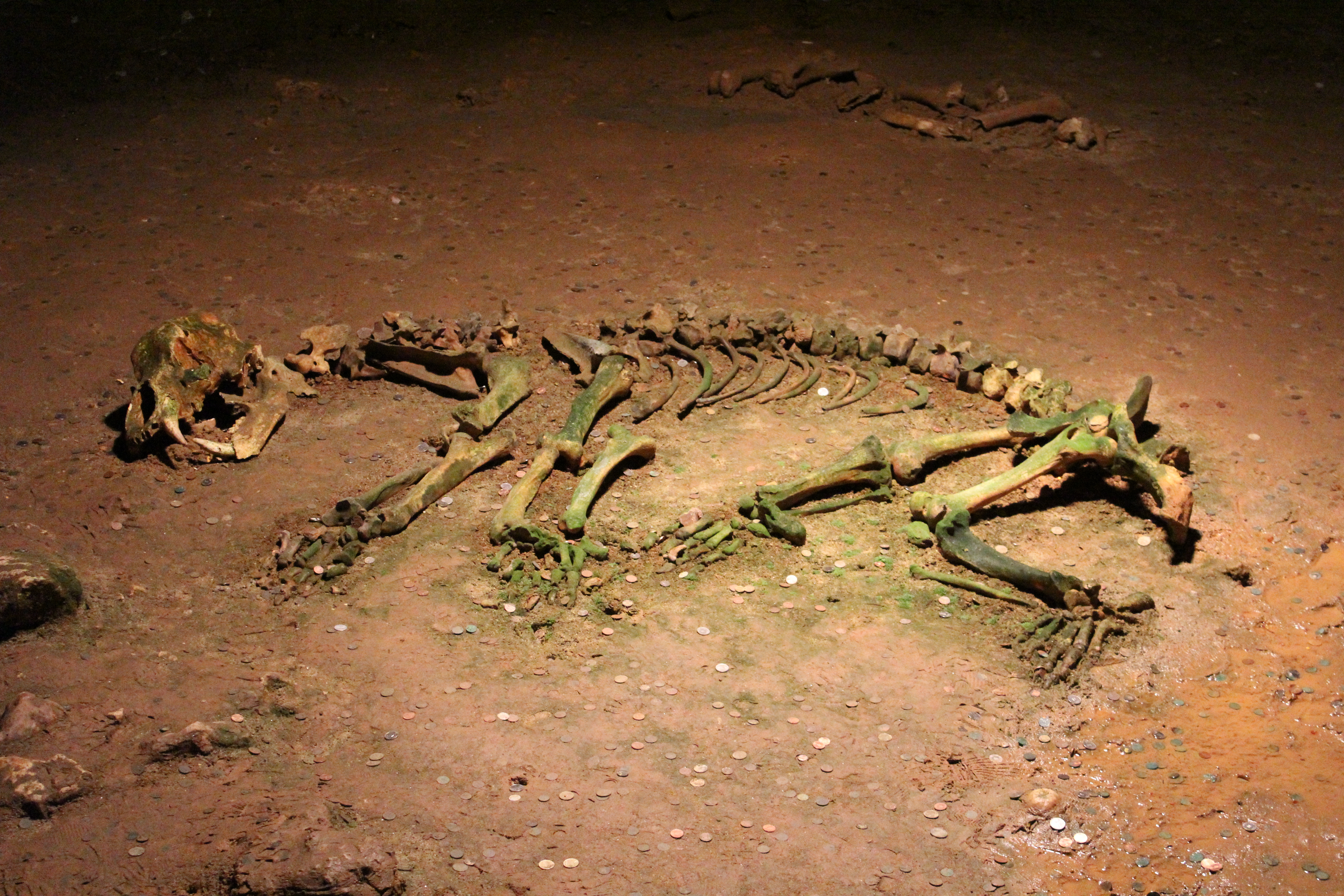
Skeleton of a cave bear in the '"Bears' Cave", Chișcău, Romania

Reassessment of fossils in 2019 indicate that the cave bear probably died out 24,000 years ago. A complex set of factors, rather than a single factor, are suggested to have led to the extinction.

Compared with other megafaunal species that also became extinct during the Last Glacial Maximum, the cave bear was believed to have had a more specialized diet of high-quality plants and a relatively restricted geographical range. This was suggested as an explanation as to why it died out so much earlier than the rest. Some experts have disputed this claim, as the cave bear had survived multiple climate changes prior to extinction. Additionally, mitochondrial DNA research indicated that the genetic decline of the cave bear began long before it became extinct, demonstrating habitat loss due to climate change was not responsible. Finally, high δ^{15}N levels were found in cave bear bones from Romania, indicating wider dietary possibilities than previously believed.

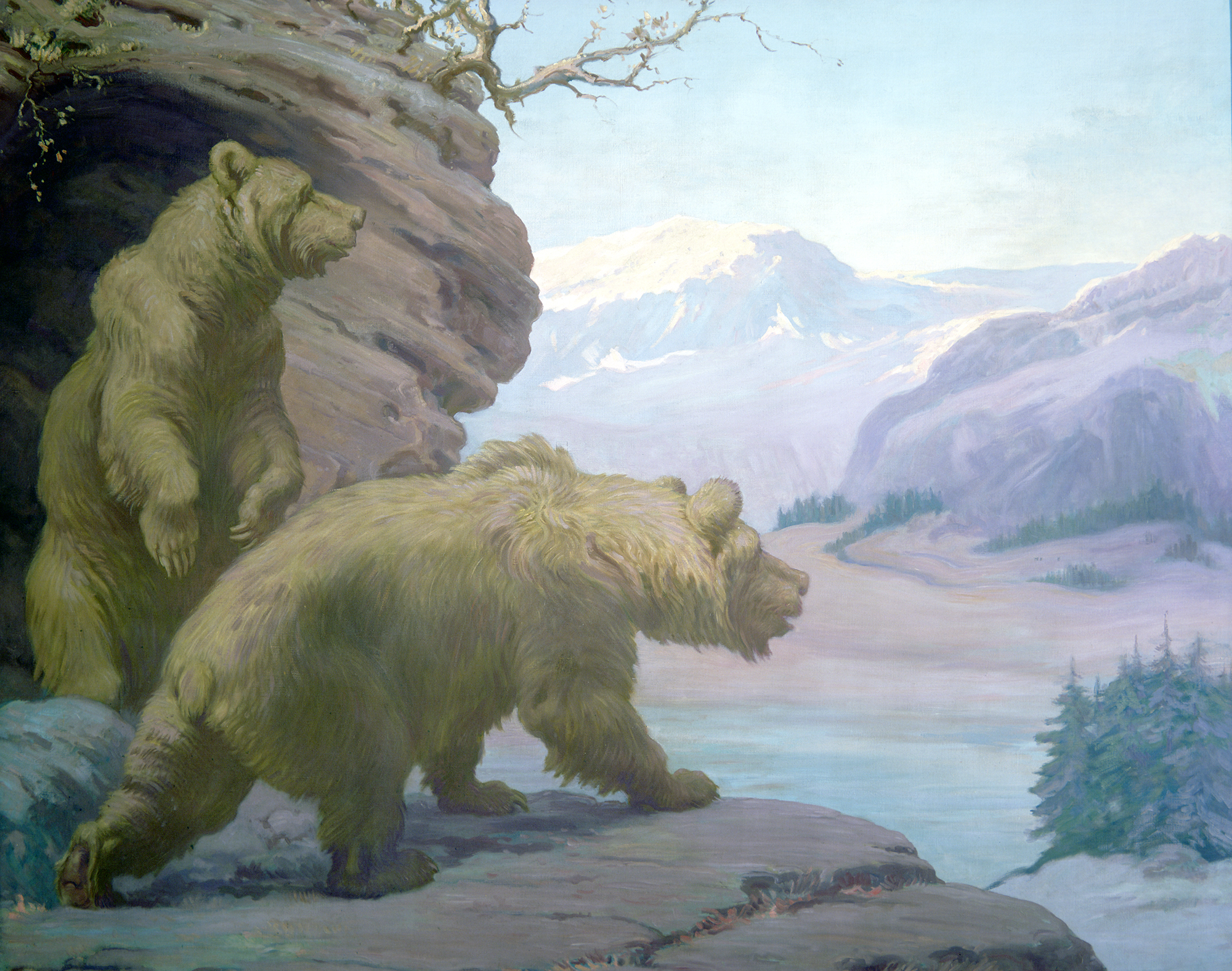
Life restoration by Charles R. Knight

Some evidence indicates that the cave bear used only caves for hibernation and was not inclined to use other locations, such as thickets, for this purpose, in contrast to the more versatile brown bear. This specialized hibernation behavior would have caused a high winter mortality rate for cave bears that failed to find available caves. Therefore, as human populations slowly increased, the cave bear faced a shrinking pool of suitable caves, and slowly faded away to extinction, as both Neanderthals and anatomically modern humans sought out caves as living quarters, depriving the cave bear of vital habitat. This hypothesis is being researched as of 2010. According to the research study, published in the journal Molecular Biology and Evolution, radiocarbon dating of the fossil remains shows that the cave bear ceased to be abundant in Central Europe around 35,000 years ago.

In addition to environmental change, human hunting has also been implicated in the ultimate extinction of the cave bear. In 2019, the results of a large scale study of 81 bone specimens (resulting in 59 new sequences) and 64 previously published complete mitochondrial genomes of cave bear mitochondrial DNA remains found in Switzerland, Poland, France, Spain, Germany, Italy and Serbia, indicated that the cave bear population drastically declined starting around 40,000 years ago at the onset of the Aurignacian, coinciding with the arrival of anatomically modern humans. It was concluded that human hunting and/or competition played a major role in their decline and ultimate disappearance, and that climate change was not likely to have been the dominant factor. In a study of Spanish cave bear mtDNA, each cave used by cave bears was found to contain almost exclusively a unique lineage of closely related haplotypes, indicating a homing behaviour for birthing and hibernation. The conclusion of this study is cave bears could not easily colonize new sites when in competition with humans for these resources.

Overhunting by humans has been dismissed by some as human populations at the time were too small to pose a serious threat to the cave bear's survival. However, the two species may have competed for living space in caves. The Chauvet Cave contains around 300 "bear hollows" created by cave bear hibernation. Unlike brown bears, cave bears are seldom represented in cave paintings, leading some experts to believe the cave bear may have been avoided by human hunters or their habitat preferences may not have overlapped. Paleontologist Björn Kurtén hypothesized cave bear populations were fragmented and under stress even before the advent of the glaciers. Populations living south of the Alps possibly survived significantly longer.

== See also ==
- Azykh Cave
- Kletno Bear Cave
- Darband Cave
- Divje Babe Flute
