= Kletno Bear Cave =

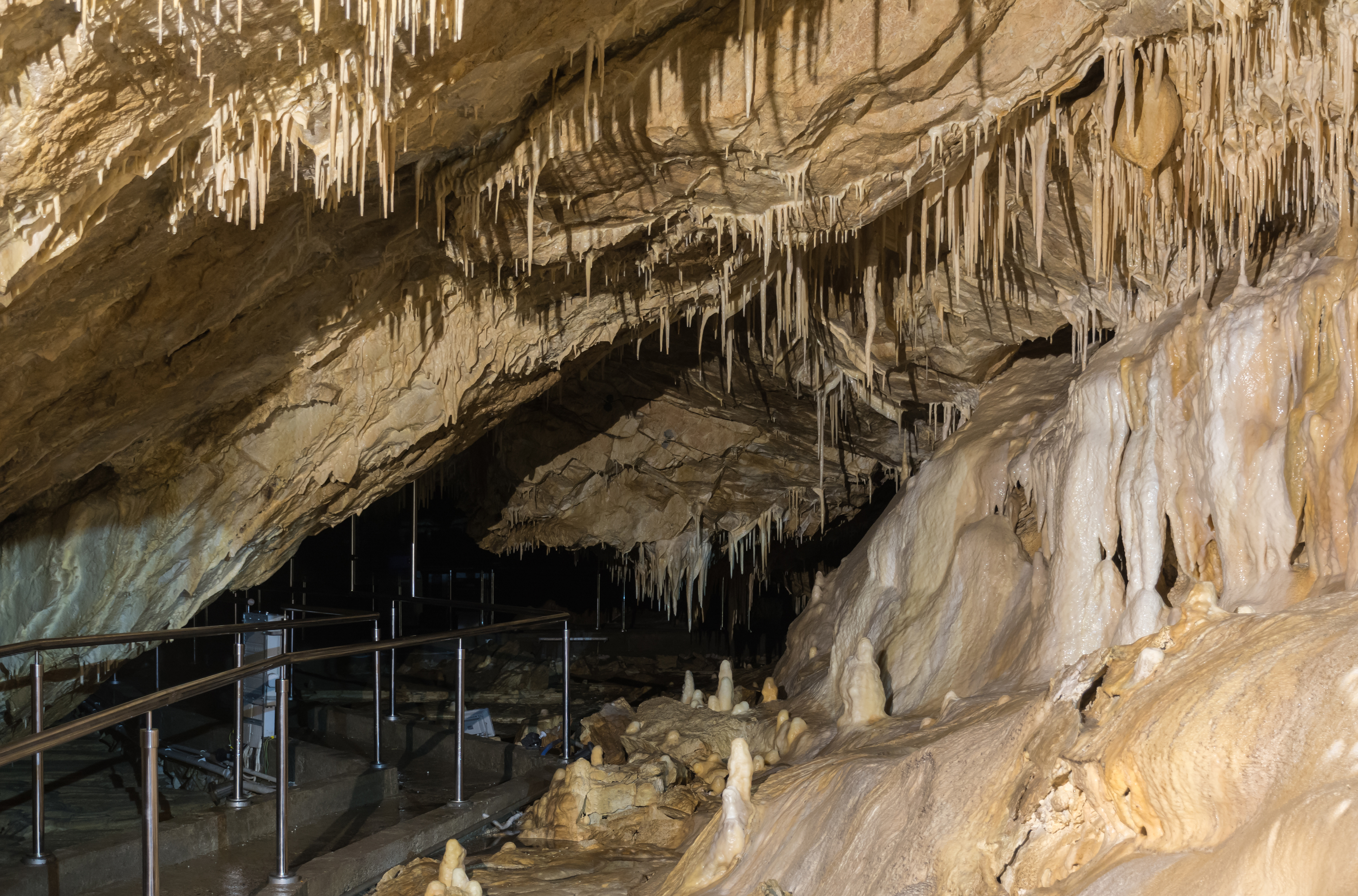
- Speleothems inside the cave.

- Location within Poland
- Location: Kletno, Kłodzko County, Lower Silesia, Poland
- Coordinates: 50°14′03″N 16°50′3″E
- Length: 2000 m
- Elevation: 94 m
- Discovery: 1966
- Entrances: 1
- Access: Public
- Show cave length: 2000 m
- Website: Official website

Kletno Bear Cave (Polish: Jaskinia Niedźwiedzia w Kletnie) is the longest cave located in the Śnieżnik Mountains, which are part of the greater Sudeten mountain range. It was discovered in 1966, near the village of Kletno in Poland. It is famous for its many excavations of the cave bear (Ursus spelaeus).

== History ==
The first 200 m (660 ft) of the cave was discovered in October 1966 during the mining process in the newly established quarry Kletno III. In 1967, new corridors were discovered, including the middle parts Sale pałacowe ("Palace Halls"), and, in January 1972, the lowest parts were discovered. New parts of the cave were uncovered in the years 2014 to 2015. In total, the cave has a length of over 2 km (1.2 mi) and is currently the longest cave in the Sudetes.

== Geography ==
The cave is situated on the right side of the valley of the stream Kleśnica in the Śnieżnik Mountains, a part of the Sudetes. The cave is located at 790 m above sea level on the slopes of Góra Stroma mountain (1,166.8 m).

== Fossil animal remnants ==
Rich bone material of Pleistocene animals was found inside the cave, including mostly mammals such as brown bear, cave lion, hyena, wolf, wild boar, and others. Bones of cave bear were dominant among the bone material, making up almost 90% of all the excavated bones.

== Gallery ==
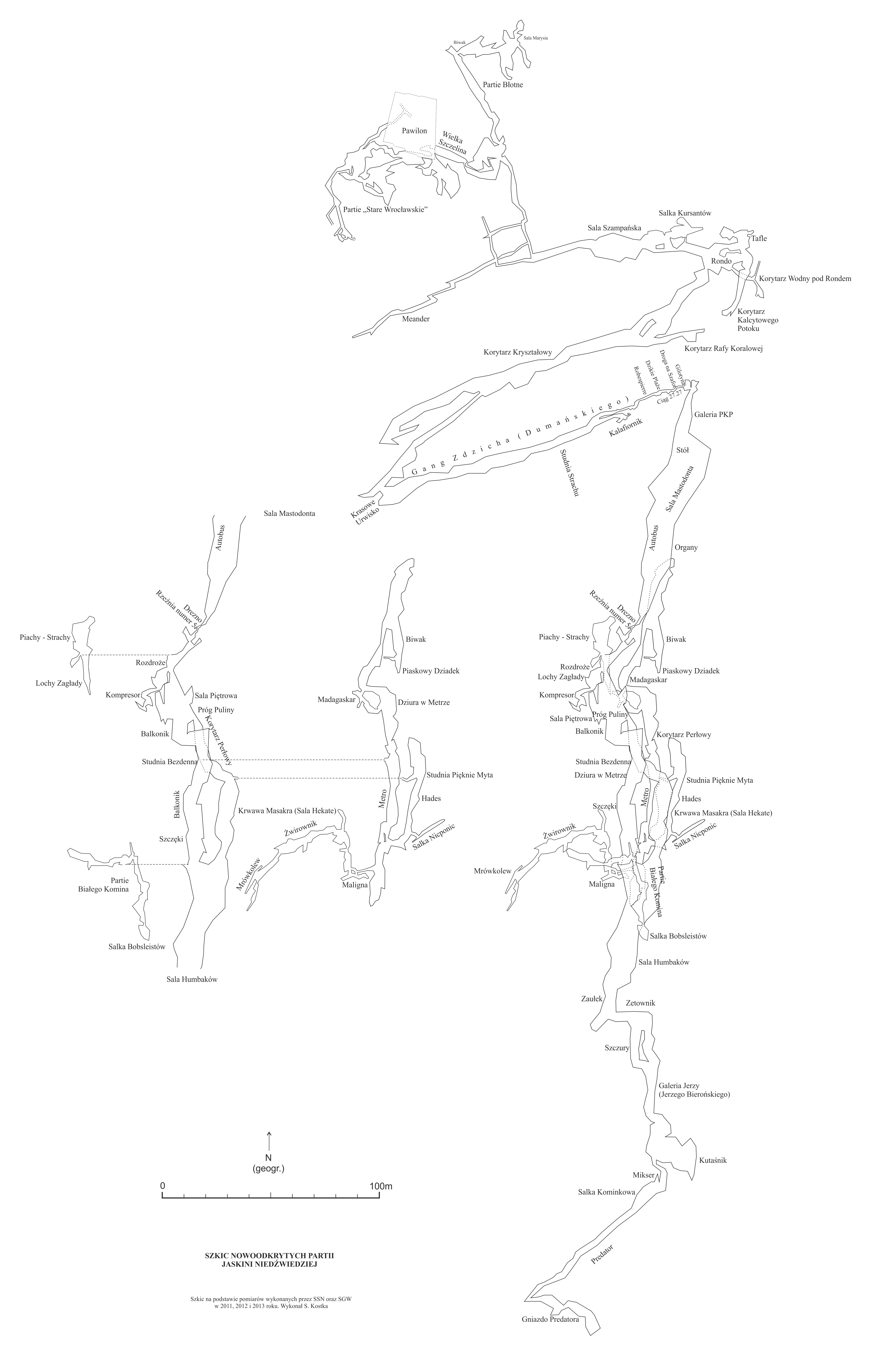
Map of the cave

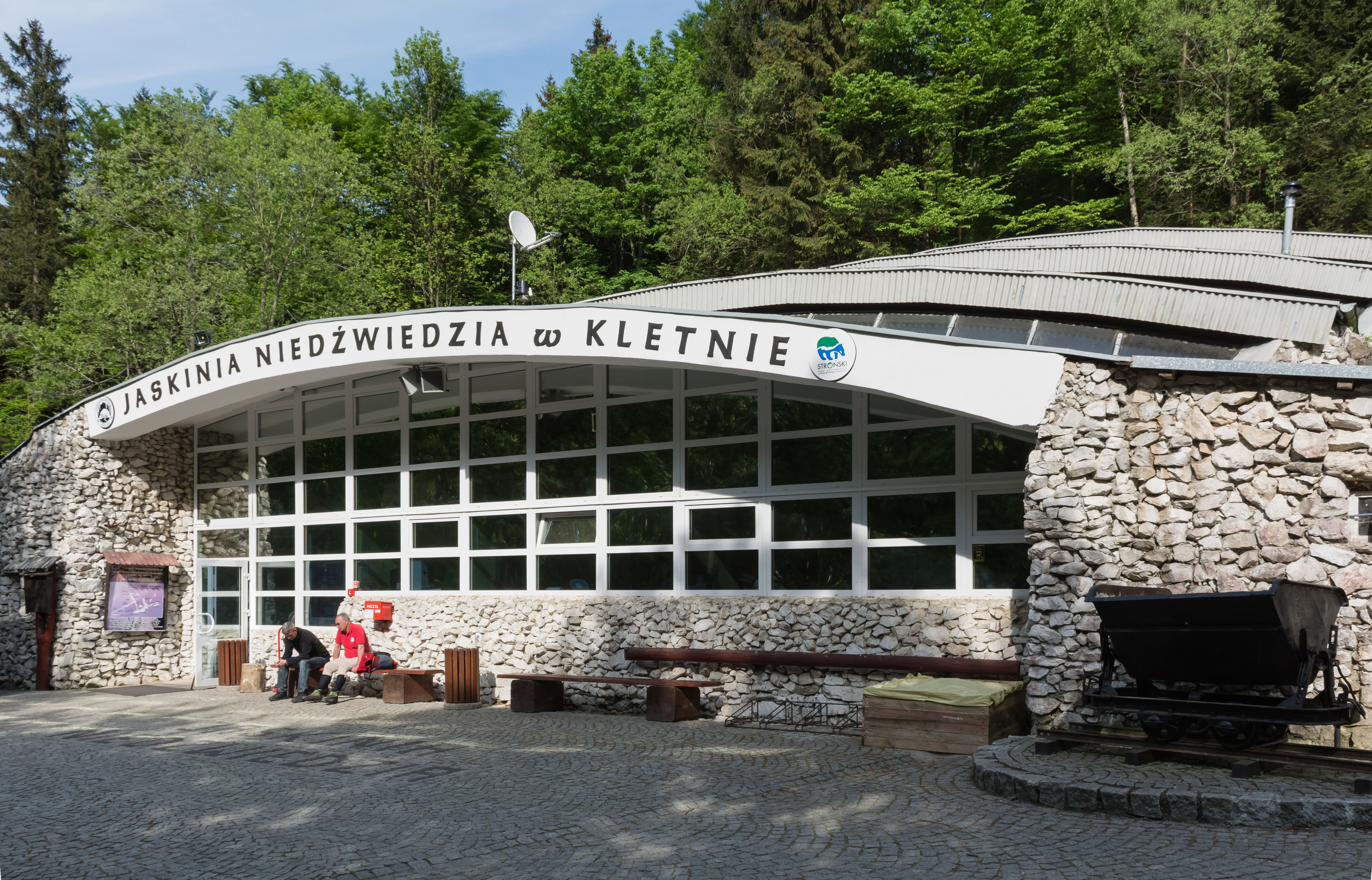
Entry to the Bear Cave pavillon

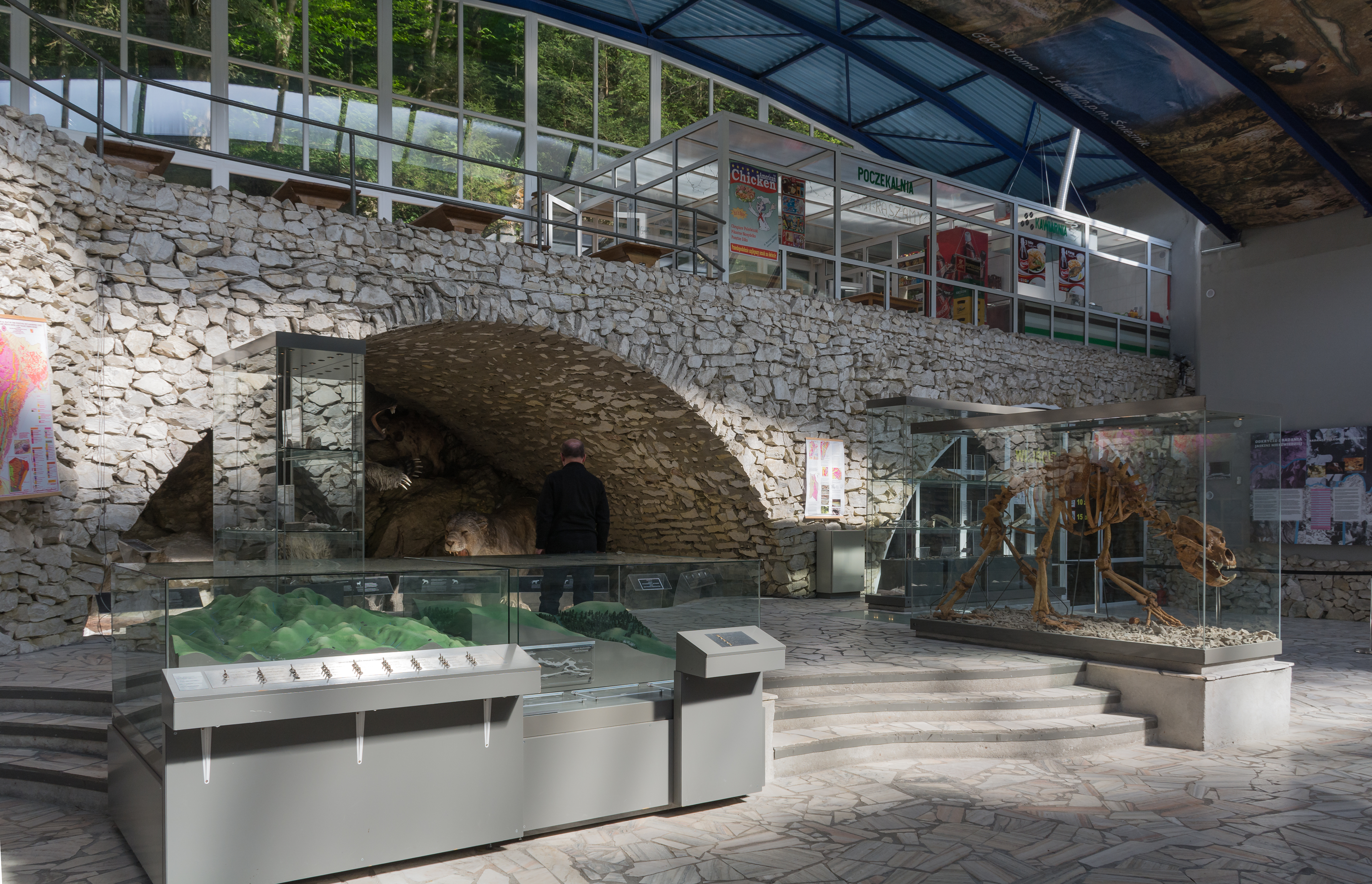
Exposition inside the pavillon with skeletons of cave lion and cave bear

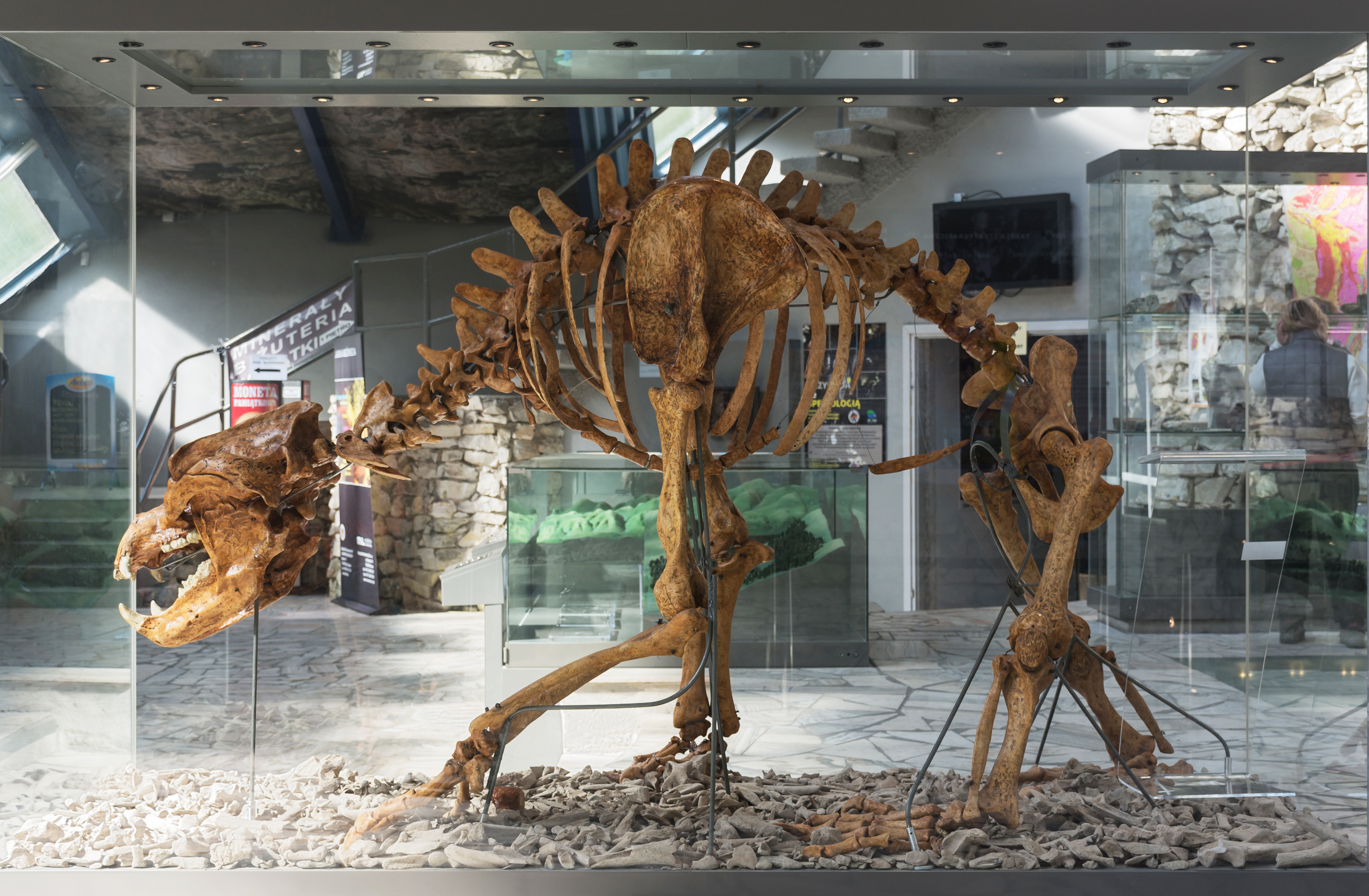
Cave bear skeleton inside the pavillon

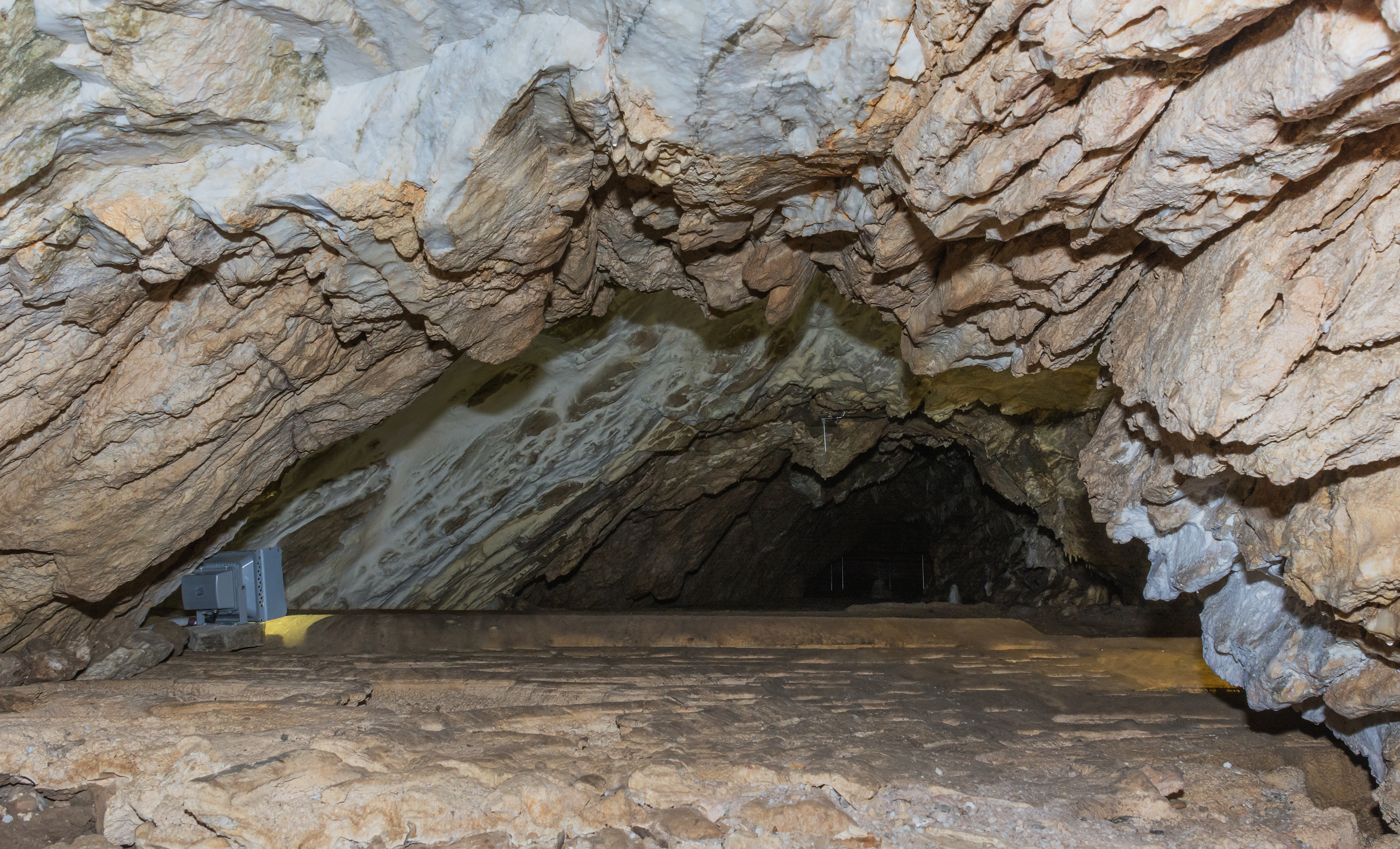
Natural entry to the cave

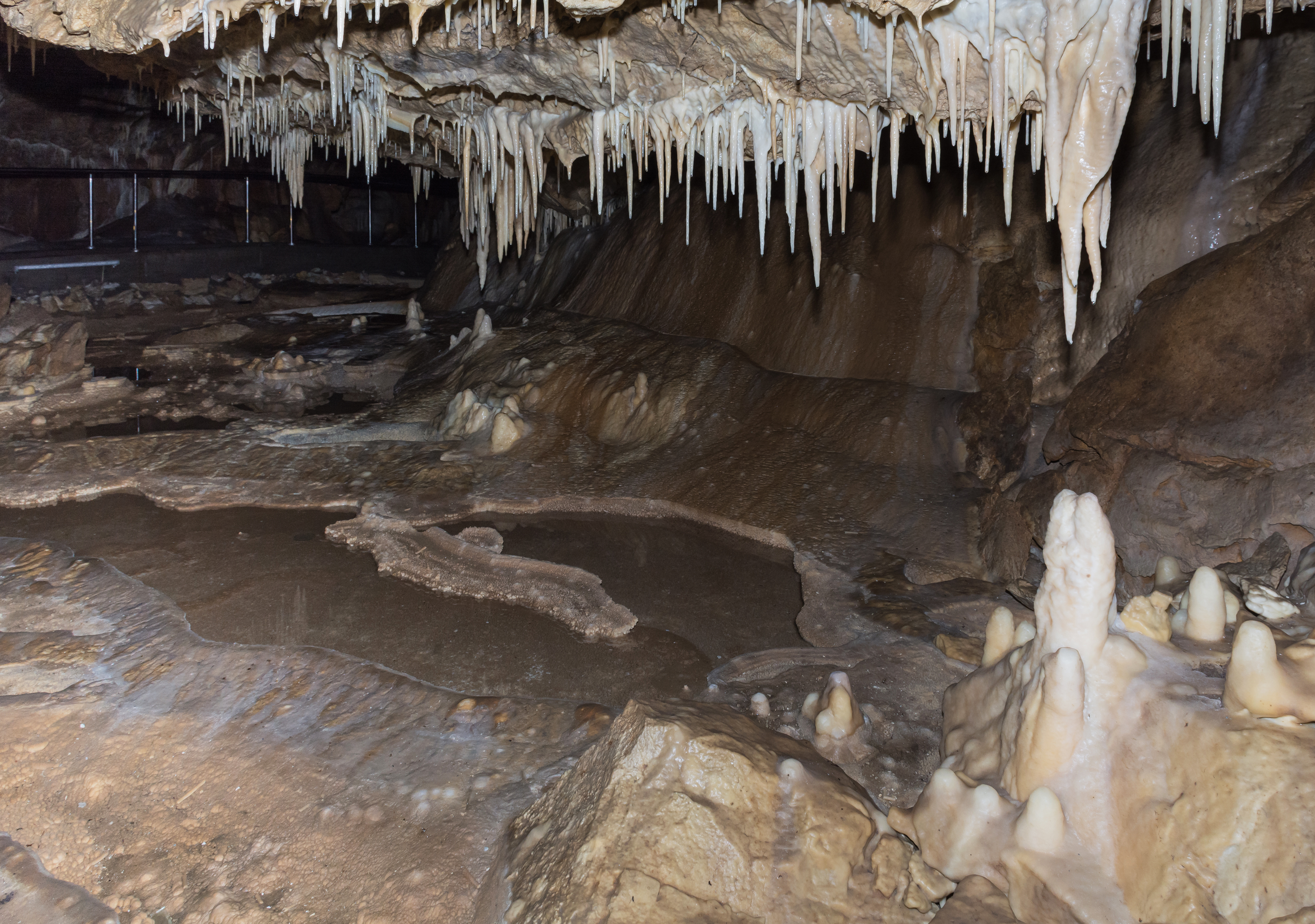
Speleothemes inside the cave

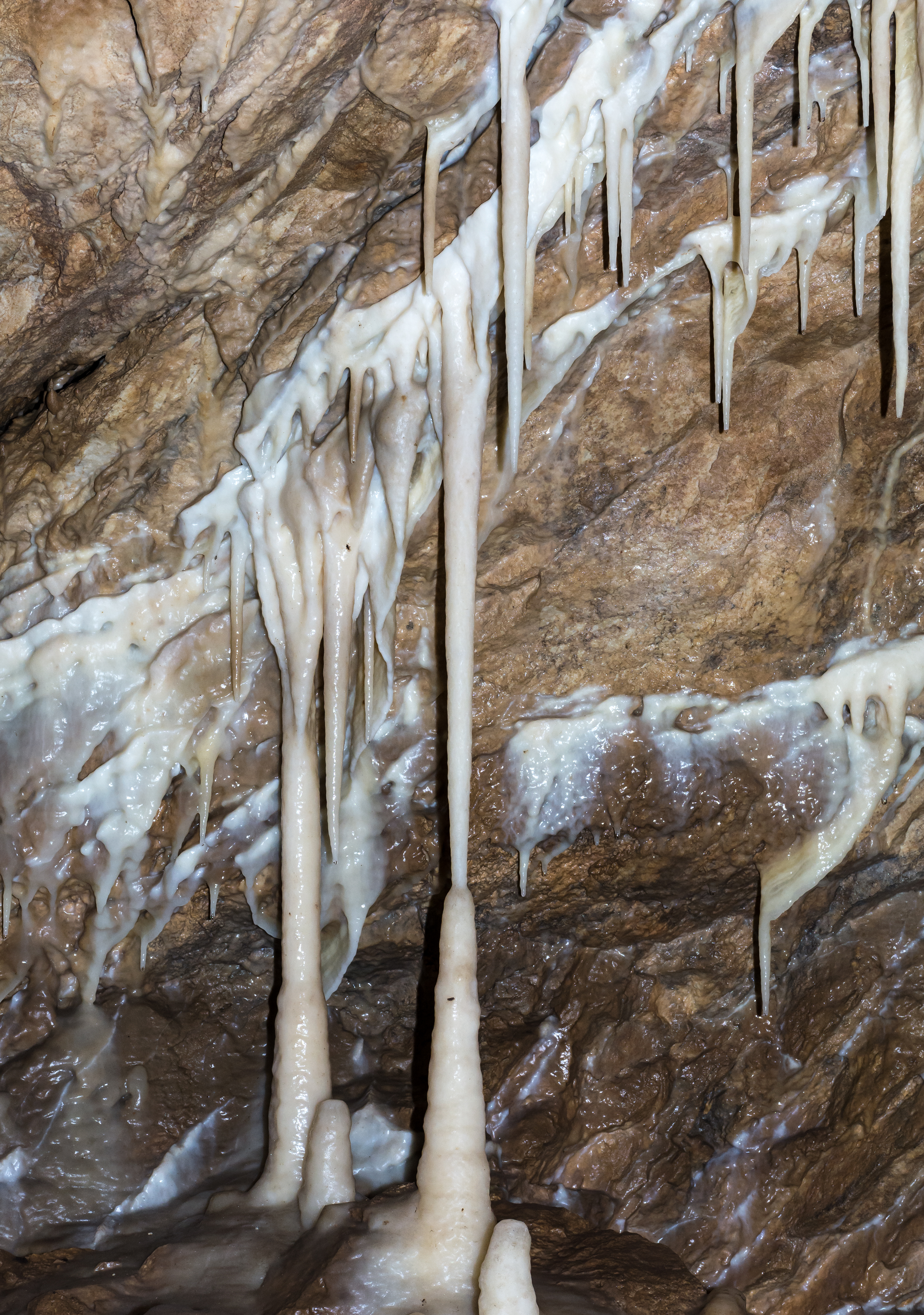
Stalagnates

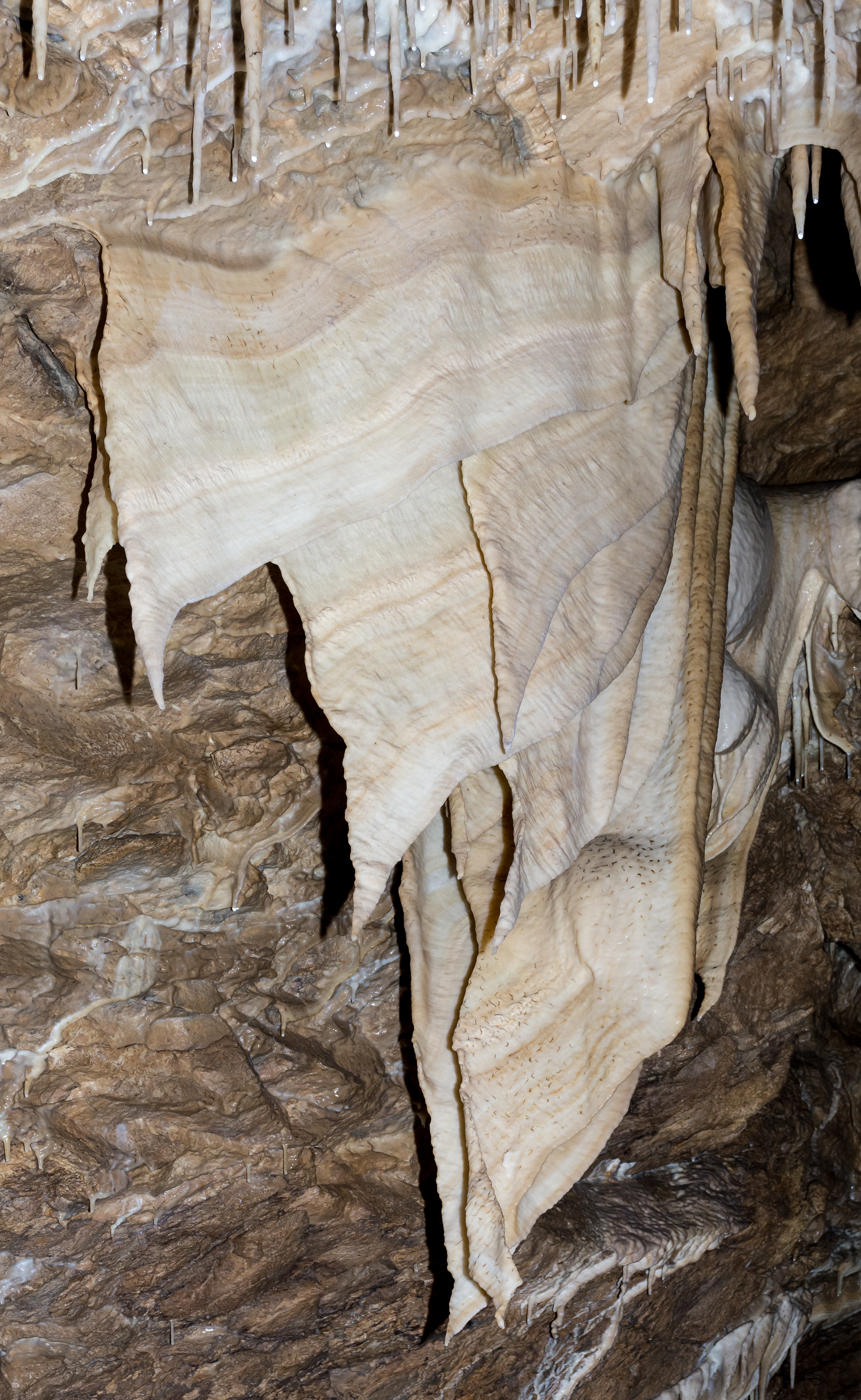

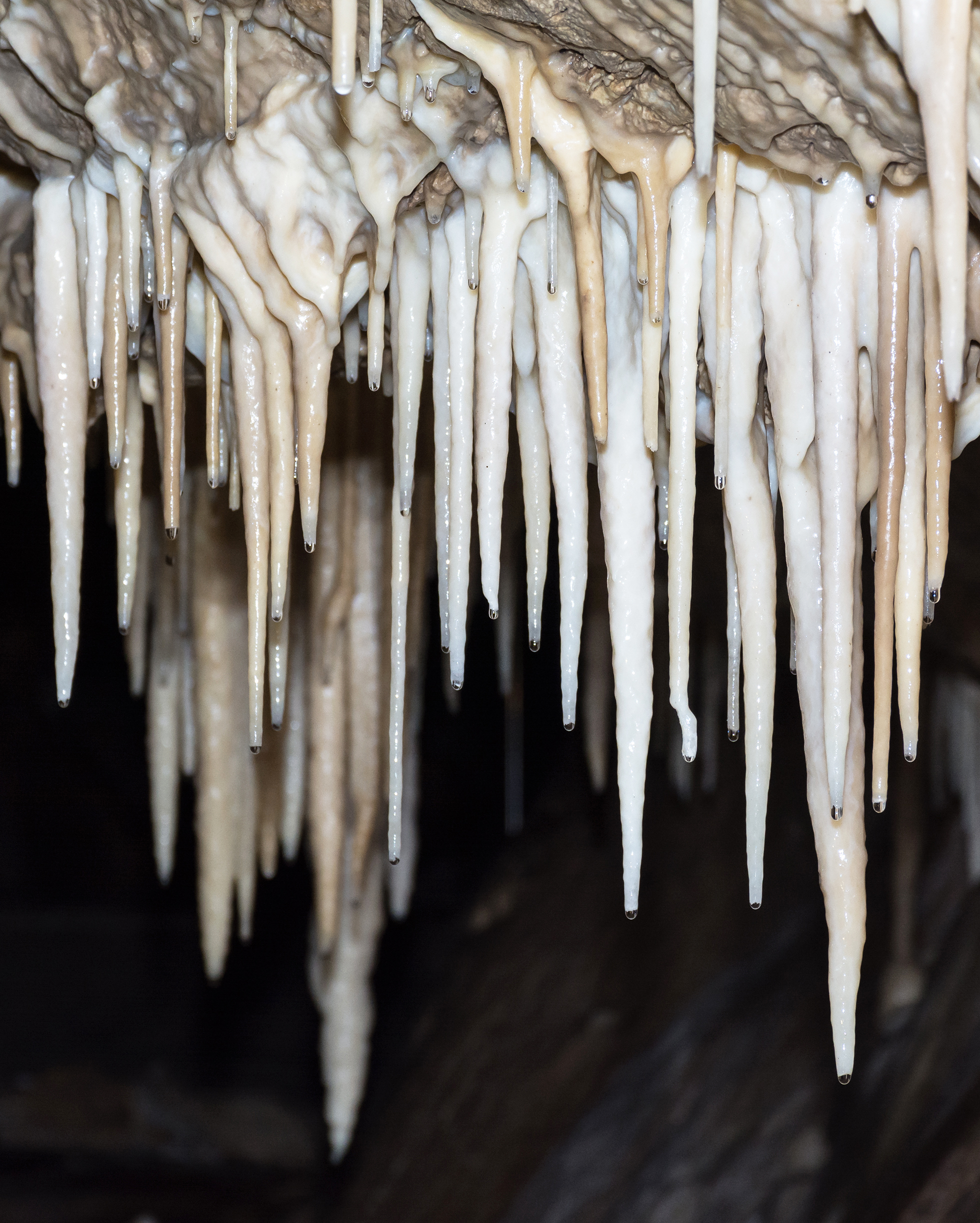
Stalactites

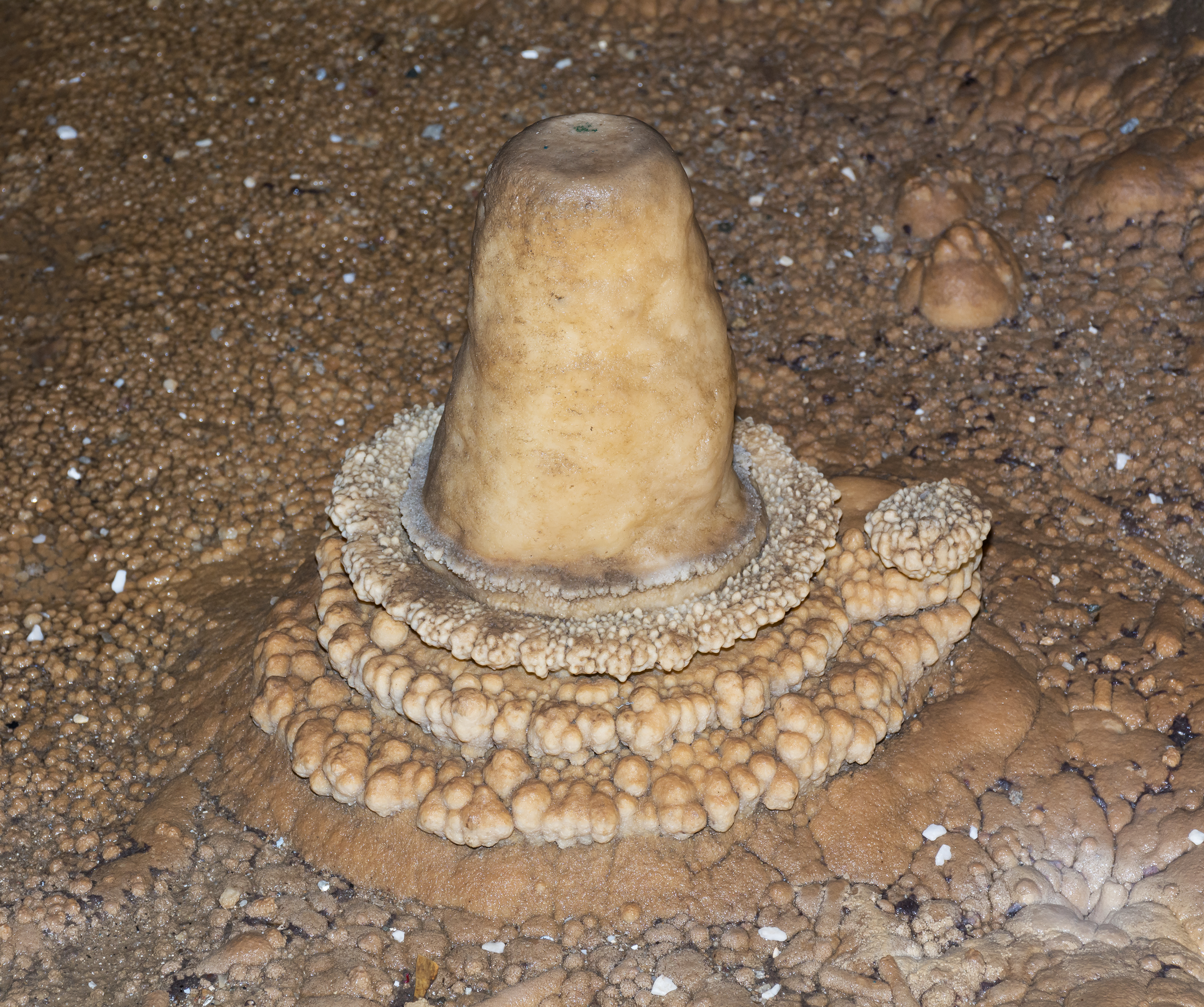
Stalagmites

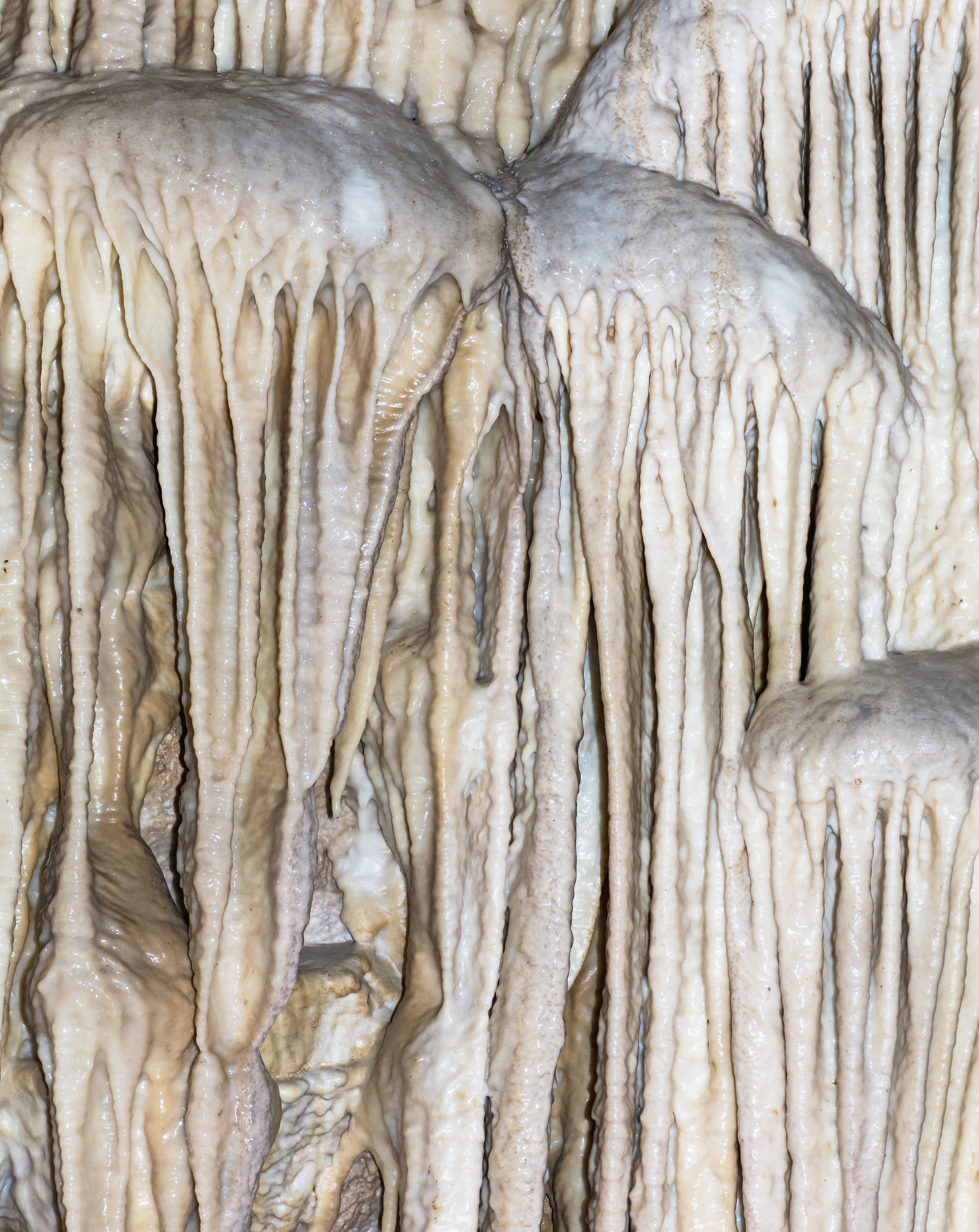
Cascades

== Bibliography ==
- Praca Zbiorowa, "Jaskinia Niedźwiedzia w Kletnie. Badanie i udostępnianie", Polska Akademia Nauk, Ossolineum, Wrocław 1989, ISBN 8304030373. (in Polish) with (in English) summary.
- Jaskinie Sudetów praca zbiorowa pod red. Mariana Puliny, Polskie Towarzystwo Przyjaciół Nauk o Ziemi, Warszawa 1996, ISBN 83-900997-9-9 (in Polish).
- Jaskinia Niedźwiedzia w Kletnie. 40 lat eksploracji, badań, ochrony i turystyki praca zbiorowa pod red. Wojciecha Ciężkowskiego, Wydawnictwo "Maria", Wrocław-Kletno 2006, ISBN 83-60478-16-3 (in Polish).
