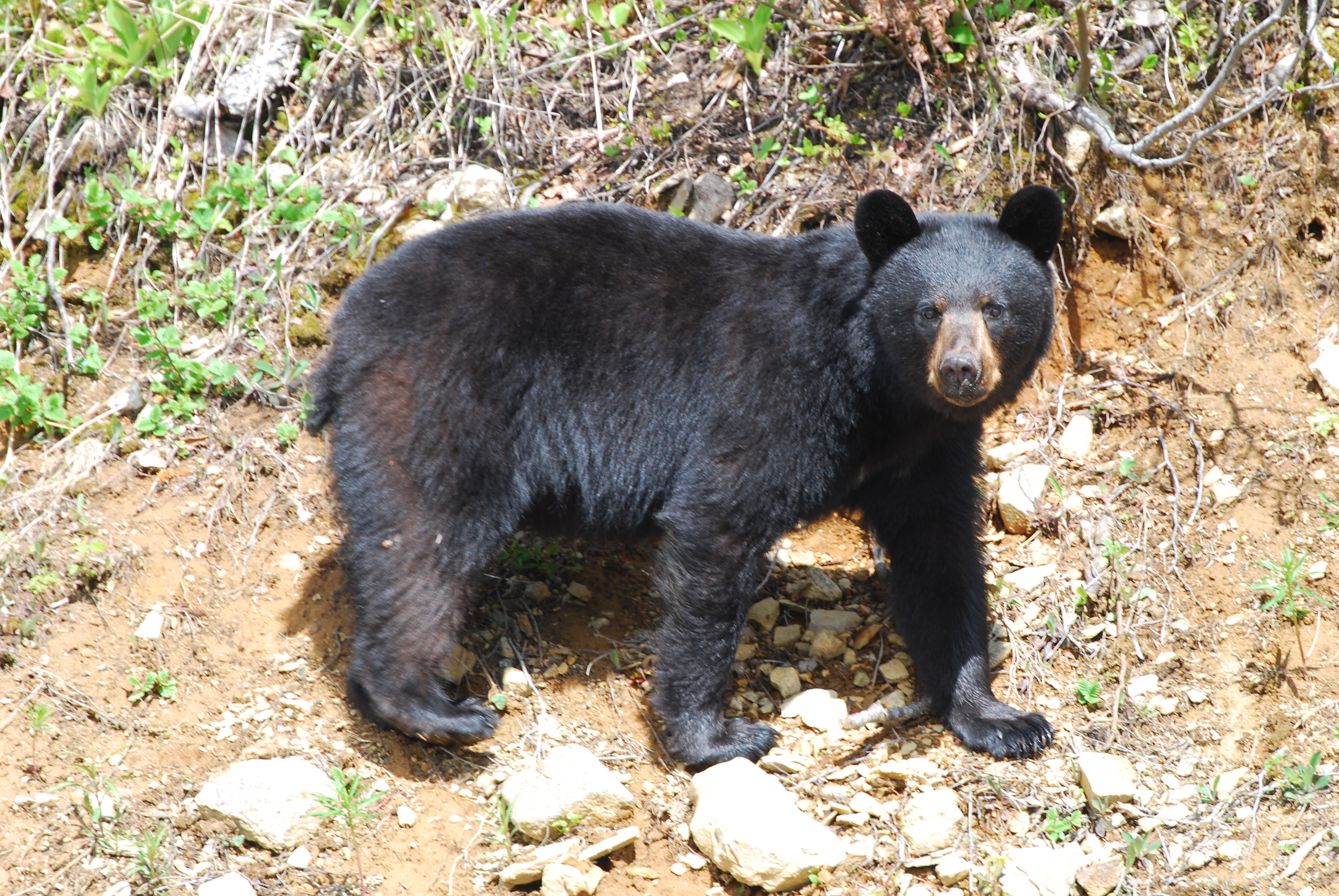

Conservation status
- Apparently Secure (NatureServe)

Scientific classification
- Kingdom: Animalia
- Phylum: Chordata
- Class: Mammalia
- Order: Carnivora
- Family: Ursidae
- Genus: Ursus
- Species: U. americanus
- Subspecies: U. a. hamiltoni

Trinomial name
- Ursus americanus hamiltoni Cameron, 1957

= Newfoundland black bear =

Subspecies of carnivore

The Newfoundland black bear (Ursus americanus hamiltoni) is a morphologically distinct subspecies of the American black bear, which is endemic to the island of Newfoundland in Atlantic Canada. The Newfoundland black bear ranges in size from 90 to 270 kilograms (200 to 600 lb) and averaging 135 kilograms (298 lb). It also has one of the longest hibernation periods of any bear in North America.
