= Ursus ingressus =

- Skeletal reconstruction of Ursus ingressus, with positively referred material in white

Scientific classification
- Kingdom: Animalia
- Phylum: Chordata
- Class: Mammalia
- Order: Carnivora
- Family: Ursidae
- Genus: Ursus
- Species: †U. ingressus

Binomial name
- †Ursus ingressus Rabeder et al., 2004

Extinct species of carnivore

Ursus ingressus is an extinct species of the cave bear species complex that lived in Central Europe during the Late Pleistocene. It is named after the Gamssulzen Cave in Austria, where the holotype of this species was found.

== Description ==
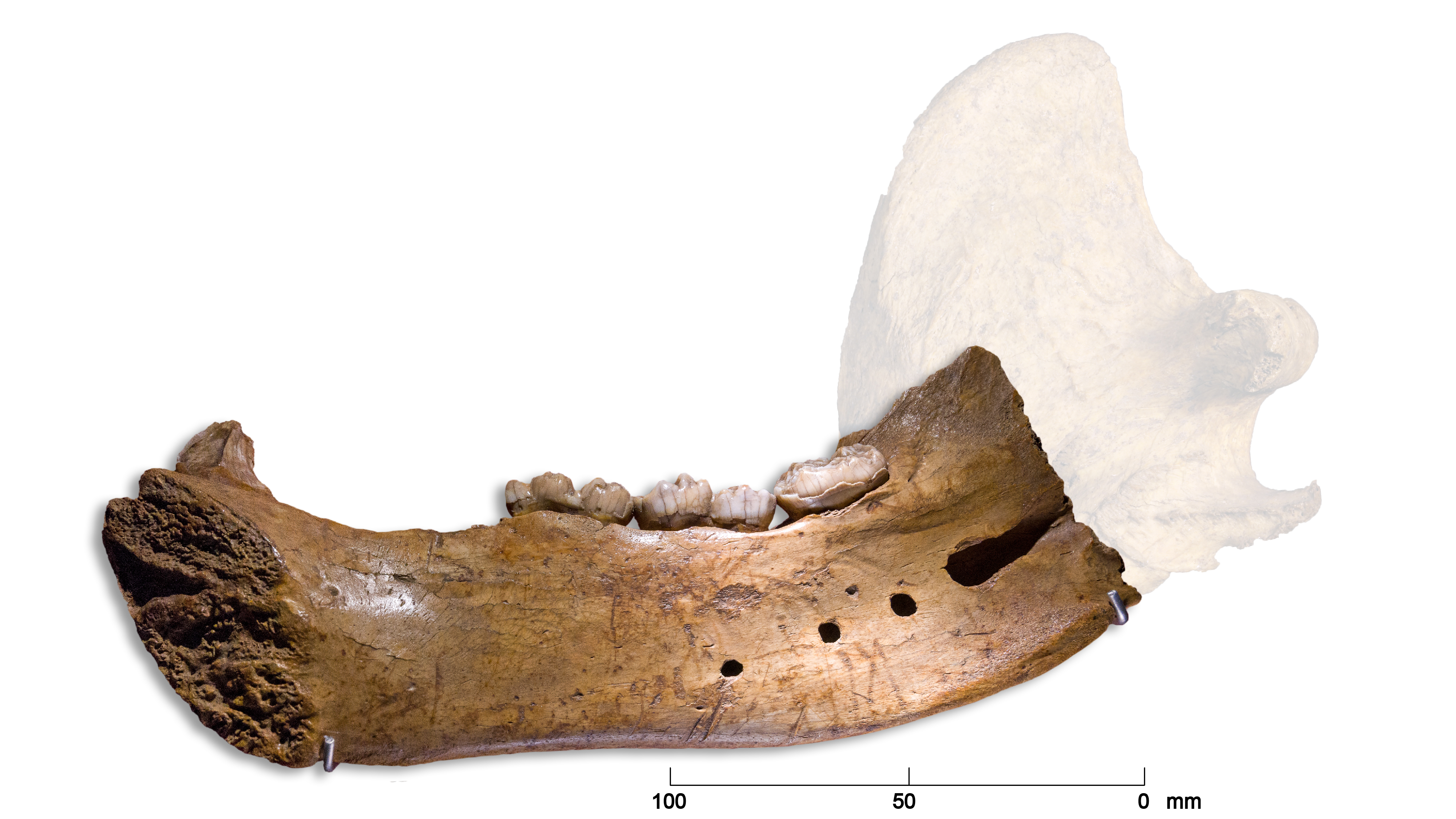
Fossil of Ursus ingressus from Potok Cave, exposed at Celje Regional Museum

Ursus ingressus was a large cave bear with massive, bulky limbs. It was larger than Ursus spelaeus, which has been estimated to weigh an average of 350 to 600 kg (770 to 1,320 lb) (male specimen).

== Behaviour ==
Some studies have suggested the Gamssulzen Cave bear to have been herbivorous, living off vegetation with little contribution of grass. Other studies proposed Ursus ingressus to have been an omnivore, with participation of terrestrial and more likely aquatic animal protein, that exceeds the participation of animal protein in the diet of the modern brown bear (Ursus arctos). However it has also been suggested, that the feeding habits of cave bears can vary heavily depending on the environment.

Skulls with bite damage from Zoolithen Cave in Germany suggest that Ursus ingressus came into conflicts with other big carnivores of the Late Pleistocene of Europe like the cave lion (Panthera spelaea) or the cave hyena (Crocuta crocuta spelaea).

== Distribution and habitat ==
It has been suggested that the Gamssulzen Cave bear dominated Ursus spelaeus in Central and Eastern Europe, while being out-competed by this species in Western Europe. Around 50,000 years ago, the Gamssulzen Cave bear migrated into the Alps and replaced two former populations of Ursus spelaeus: Ursus spelaeus eremus and Ursus spelaeus ladinicus. Ursus ingressus has been found as far east as the Ural Mountains in Russia and as far west as the Swabian Jura in Germany.

It has mostly been found in medium and high elevated regions and probably was adapted to continental environments with cold and arid climate.

== Evolution and extinction ==
Ursus ingressus and Ursus spelaeus evolved from Ursus deningeri and probably diverged between 173,000 and 414,000, or possibly as much as 600,000 years ago. Some studies still question whether U. ingressus and U. spelaeus are separate species, instead treating them as subspecies of a single species.

The Gamssulzen Cave bear survived U. spelaeus for about 1000 to 2000 years, locally replacing this species, but also became extinct about 30,000 years ago, just prior to the Last Glacial Maximum. The reasons for their extinction are still being discussed, with climate change and human hunting suggested as possible reasons.
