= Ursus kudarensis =

Ursus kudarensis Temporal range: Middle to Late Pleistocene, 0.35–0.04 Ma
- Later view of the holotype fossil, ZIRAS No. 31260 found in Kudaro III

Scientific classification
- Kingdom: Animalia
- Phylum: Chordata
- Class: Mammalia
- Order: Carnivora
- Family: Ursidae
- Subfamily: Ursinae
- Genus: Ursus
- Species: U. kudarensis

Binomial name
- Ursus kudarensis Baryshnikov, 1985

Synonyms
- Ursus spelaeus kudarensis

Extinct species of bear

Ursus kudarensis is an extinct species of the cave bear complex that lived in the Caucasus Mountains during the Pleistocene epoch, nearly 350,000–40,000 years ago.

== Taxonomy ==
The species was described in 1985 by Soviet paleontologist Gennady Baryshnikov during the excavations at the Kudaro cave complex, Georgia. It was initially defined as Ursus spelaeus kudarensis, a cave bear subspecies named after its type locality. Analyzing four fossil skulls and more than 200 molars and premolars from Kudaro III, Baryshnikov observed several distinct morphological features that deviated from the cave bear populations of Eastern and Western Europe, including less elongated skulls and archaic dental features.

== See also ==
- Cave bear
- Brown bear
- Ursus kanivetz
