= Piz dles Cunturines =

Mountain in Italy

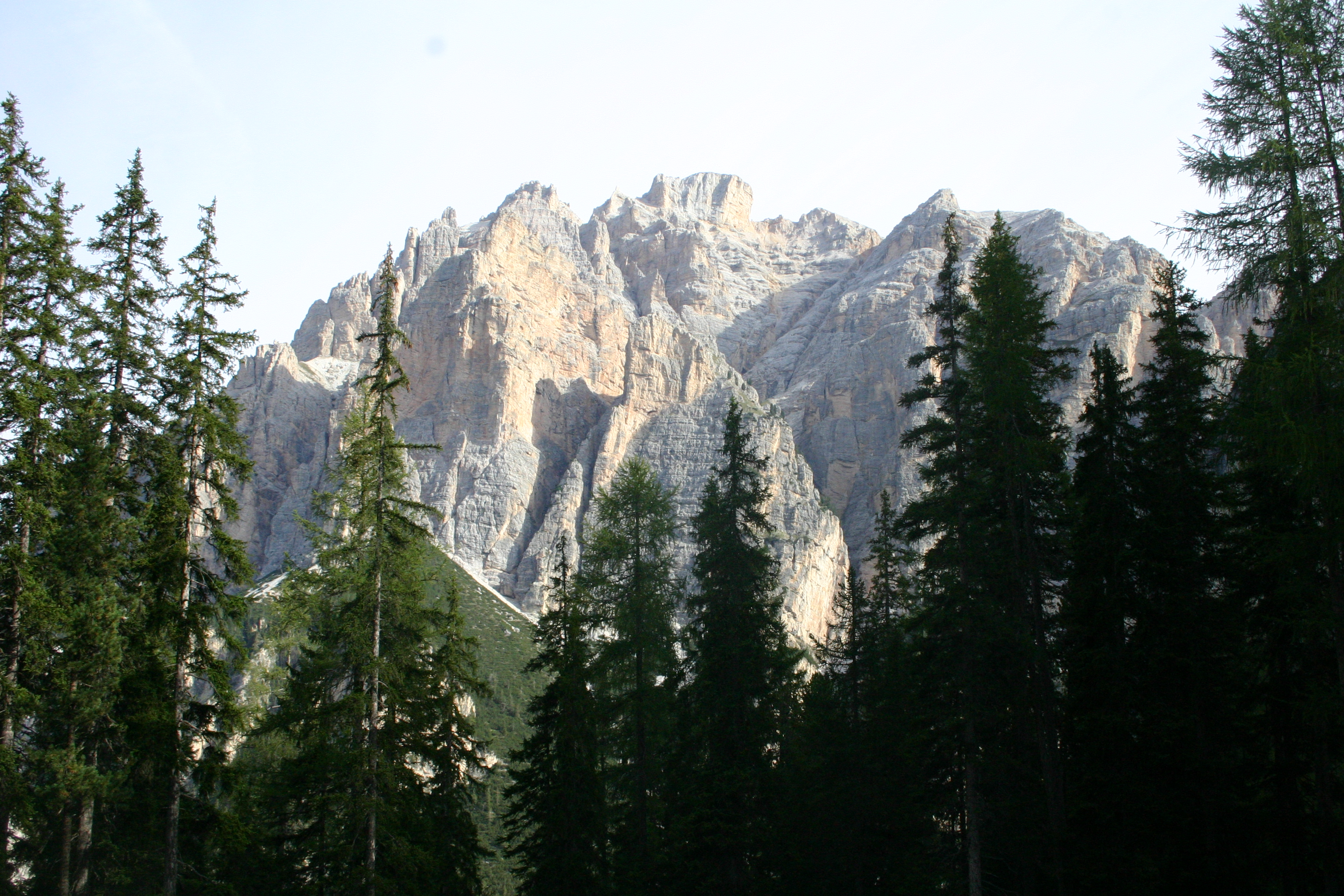
- Cunturines from the South

Highest point
- Elevation: 3,064 m (10,052 ft)
- Prominence: 907 m (2,976 ft)
- Listing: Alpine mountains above 3000 m
- Coordinates: 46°34′33″N 11°58′40″E

Geography
- Location within Alps
- Country: Italy
- Province: South Tyrol
- Protected area: Fanes-Sennes-Prags Nature Park
- Parent range: Dolomites; Fanes Group
- Topo map: Tabacco 03 Cortina d’Ampezzo e Dolomiti Ampezzane

Geology
- Rock age: Triassic
- Rock type: Dolomite

The Piz dles Cunturines (Ladin: Piz dles Cunturines; German: Cunturines-Spitze; Italian: Cima Cunturines or Cima Conturines [ˈtʃiːma kontuˈriːnes]) is a mountain in the Dolomites in South Tyrol, Italy.

== Climate ==
Based on the Köppen climate classification, Piz dles Cunturines is located in an alpine climate zone with long, cold winters, and short, mild summers. Weather systems are forced upwards by the mountains (orographic lift), causing moisture to drop in the form of rain and snow. The months of June through September offer the most favorable weather for visiting or climbing in this area.

== Gallery ==
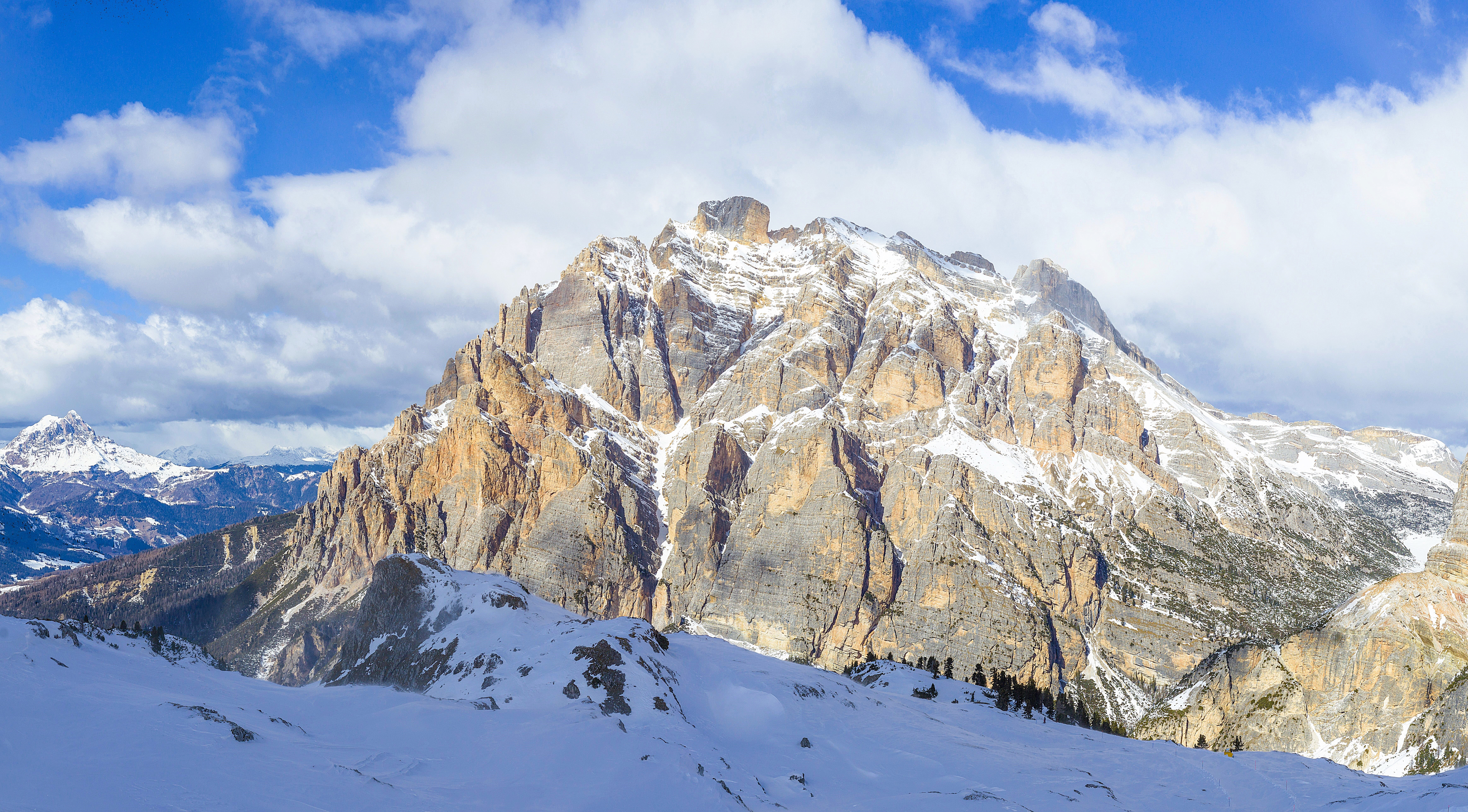
South aspect

== See also ==
- Southern Limestone Alps
