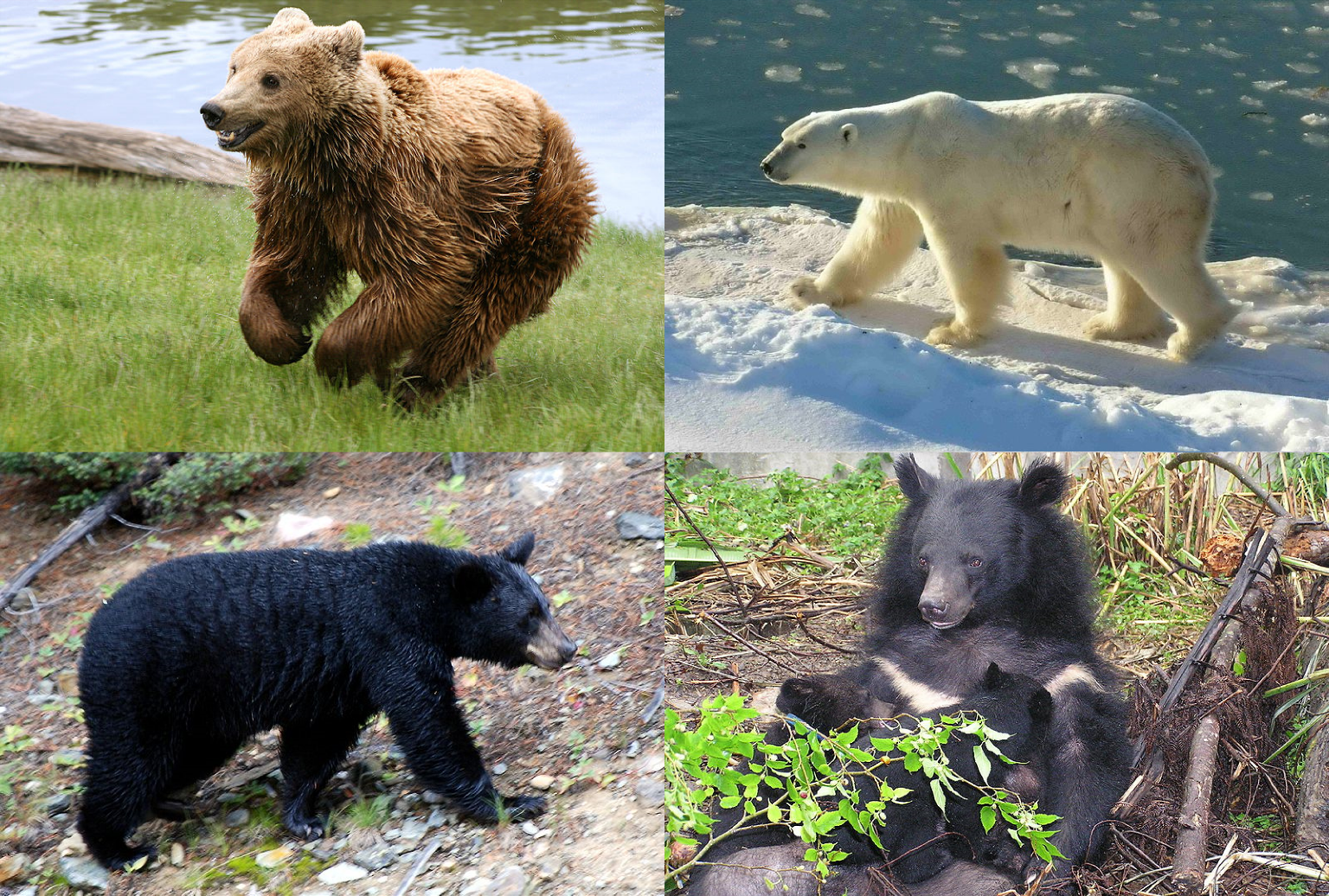
- Anti-clockwise from top left: brown bear, American black bear, Asian black bear, polar bear

Scientific classification
- Kingdom: Animalia
- Phylum: Chordata
- Class: Mammalia
- Order: Carnivora
- Family: Ursidae
- Subfamily: Ursinae
- Tribe: Ursini
- Genus: Ursus; Linnaeus, 1758

Type species
- Ursus arctos Linnaeus, 1758

Living species
- Ursus americanus; Ursus arctos; Ursus maritimus; Ursus thibetanus; For fossil species, see text
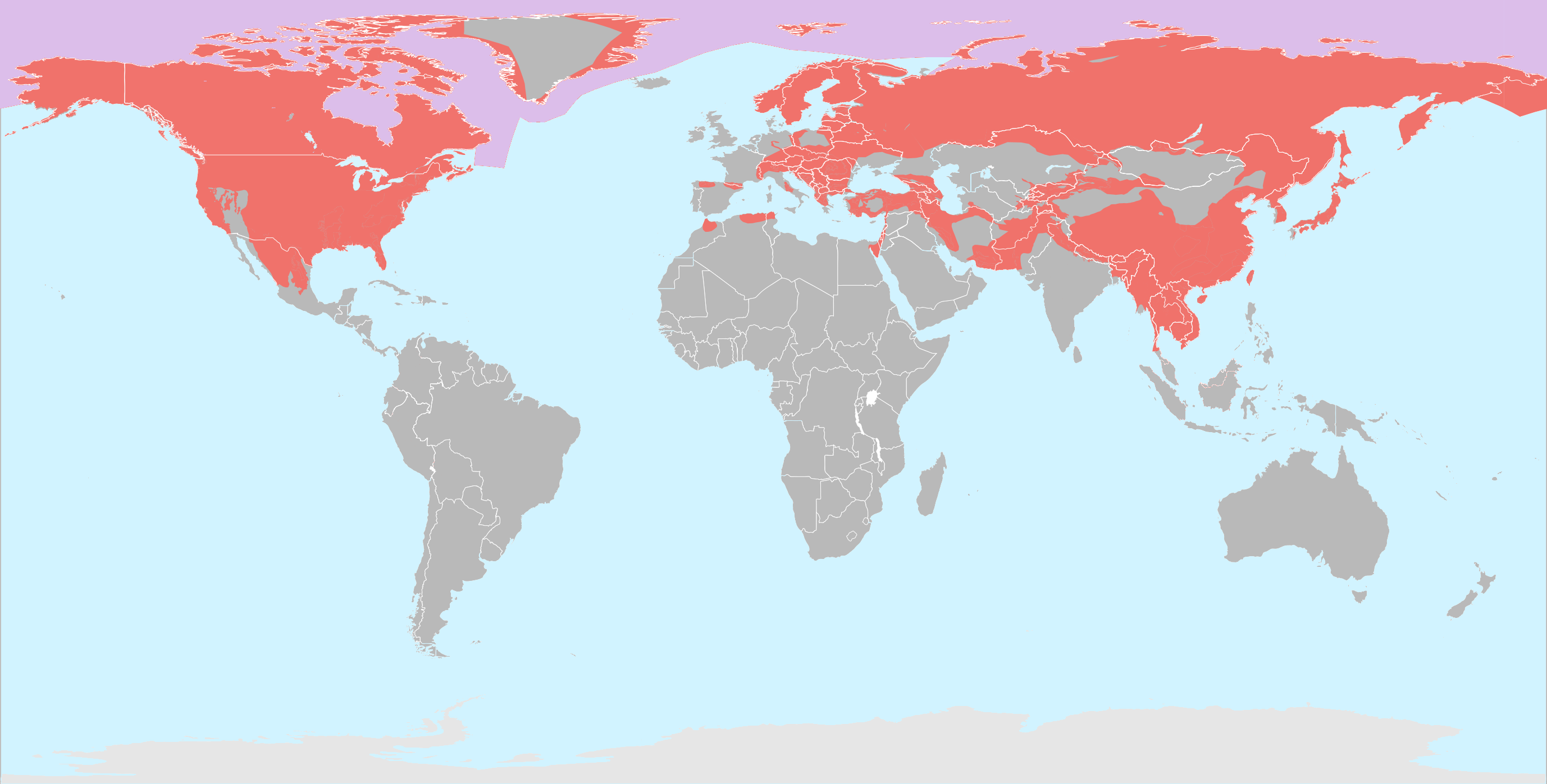
- Ursus distribution

Synonyms
- Arcticonus Pocock, 1917; Danis J. E. Gray, 1825; Euarctos Gray, 1864; Mamursus Herrara, 1899; Melanarctos Heude, 1898; Mylarctos Lonney, 1923; Myrmarctos Gray, 1864; Selenarctos Heude, 1901; Spelearctos Geoffrey, 1833; Thalassarctos J. E. Gray, 1825; Thalassiarchus Kobolt, 1896; Ursarctos Heude, 1898; Ursulus Kretzoi, 1954; Vetularctos Merriam, 1918

= Ursus (mammal) =

Ursus Temporal range: Pliocene–Holocene, 5.333–0 Ma

Genus of bears

Ursus is a genus in the family Ursidae (bears) that includes the widely distributed brown bear, the polar bear, the American black bear, and the Asian black bear. The name is derived from the Latin ursus, meaning bear.

== Taxonomy and systematics ==
=== Extant species ===
Genus Ursus – Linnaeus, 1758 – four species
| Common name | Scientific name and subspecies | Range | Size and ecology | IUCN status and estimated population |
|---|---|---|---|---|
| American black bear | Ursus americanus Pallas, 1780 16 subspecies: U. a. altifrontalis – Olympic black bear; U. a. amblyceps – New Mexico black bear; U. a. americanus – Eastern black bear; U. a. californiensis – California black bear; U. a. carlottae – Haida Gwaii black bear or Queen Charlotte Islands black bear; U. a. cinnamomum – cinnamon bear; U. a. emmonsii – glacier bear; U. a. eremicus – East Mexican black bear; U. a. floridanus – Florida black bear; U. a. hamiltoni – Newfoundland black bear; U. a. kermodei – Kermode bear or spirit bear; U. a. luteolus – Louisiana black bear; U. a. machetes – West Mexican black bear; U. a. perniger – Kenai black bear; U. a. pugnax – Dall Island black bear; U. a. vancouveri – Vancouver Island black bear | American Southwest and Mexico | Size: Habitat: Diet: | LC |
| Brown bear | Ursus arctos Linnaeus, 1758 15 subspecies: U. a. arctos – Eurasian brown bear; U. a. collaris – East Siberian brown bear; U. a. beringianus – Kamchatkan brown bear; †U. a. californicus - California grizzly bear (extinct); †U. a. crowtheri – Atlas bear (extinct); †U. a. dalli – Dall Island brown bear (extinct); U. a. gyas - Alaska Peninsula brown bear; U. a. horribilis – grizzly bear; U. a. isabellinus – Himalayan brown bear; U. a. lasiotus – Ussuri brown bear; U. a. middendorffi – Kodiak bear; U. a. pruinosus – Tibetan blue bear; U. a. sitkensis – Sitka brown bear; U. a. stikeenensis - Stikine brown bear; U. a. syriacus – Syrian brown bear | Russia, Central Asia, China, Canada, the United States (mostly Alaska), Scandinavia, and the Carpathian region (especially Romania), Anatolia, and Caucasus | Size: Habitat: Diet: | LC |
| Polar bear | Ursus maritimus Phipps, 1774 2 subspecies: U. m. maritimus modern polar bear; † U. m. tyrannus Pleistocene polar bear (possibly a brown bear) | Arctic Circle and adjacent land masses as far south as Newfoundland. | Size: Habitat: Diet: | VU |
| Asian black bear | Ursus thibetanus G. Cuvier, 1823 7 subspecies: U. t. formosanus - Formosan black bear, U. t. gedrosianus – Balochistan black bear or Pakistan black bear; U. t. japonicus – Japanese black bear; U. t. laniger – Himalayan black bear; U. t. mupinensis – Indochinese black bear; U. t. thibetanus – Tibetan black bear; U. t. ussuricus – Ussuri black bear | Indian subcontinent, Korea, northeastern China, the Russian Far East, the Honshū and Shikoku islands of Japan, and Taiwan | Size: Habitat: Diet: | VU |

A hybrid between grizzly bears and polar bears has also been recorded. Known commonly as a pizzly, prizzly, or grolar bear, the official name is simply "grizzly–polar bear hybrid".

=== Fossil species ===
- †Ursus dolinensis (Garcia & Arsuaga, 2001)
- †Ursus etruscus Cuvier, 1823
- †Ursus minimus (Devèze & Bouillet, 1827)
- Cave bear complex:
  - †Ursus deningeri Richenau, 1904
  - †Ursus ingressus Rabeder, Hofreiter, Nagel & Withalm 2004
  - †Ursus kudarensis Baryshnikov, 1985
  - †Ursus spelaeus Rosenmüller, 1794
  - †Ursus rossicus Borissiak, 1930

== Mating system ecology ==
The mating systems within the genus Ursus are primarily classified as polygynous, polyandrous and promiscuous. Both males and females mate with more than one partner and use various strategies to increase their reproductive success. Since bears are sexually dimorphic, sexual conflict is a primary driving force behind sexual selection influencing intra-sexual and inter-sexual competition. Unlike more social species, bears, being solitary mammals, have wide-ranging habitats to locate potential mates. Due to the asynchrony of oestrous phases and lengthy parental care by females, bear populations are usually male-biased, meaning that females are more choosy and males are more competitive. Intra-sexual selection is then characterized by male-male competitions influenced by female mate choice.

Mating seasons fluctuate based on species dependent on geographical location. American black bears (Ursus amercanus), brown bears (Ursus arctos) and polar bears (Ursus maritimus) all have mating seasons occurring within a three-month duration during the spring and summer months (approximately May – July), with delayed implantation occurring in late fall (November), and cubs born within the den during early winter (January). Females, on average, mate with three to four males during a mating season and mating males have more variation, mating with one to eight females during a mating season. Since reproductive success is positively correlated with age and size in bear populations, there are also males that do not mate at all until they are able to compete with larger males. There is a very loose dominance hierarchy within bear mating systems due to their solitary nature. Majority of dominance hierarchies are found at food congregations in which population density is high and individuals are ranked based on size, mass, aggressiveness and willingness to fight. Overall, dominance hierarchies have lower adaptive strategies in solitary species and dominance is established based on encounters during the breeding season.

The mating system is generally characterised by two main components, the search phase and the encounter phase. During the breeding season, both males and females expand their home ranges to help increase the likelihood of finding potential mates. Males, especially, adopt a roaming strategy, covering a large geographic range to find receptive females and tracking them via chemoreceptors. Male bears are not considered to be territorial, but they do have large home ranges that may overlap with female home ranges, giving them access to a range of 3–15 females.

== Male-male competition ==
Males compete for females using contest competition, scramble competition and sperm competition as mechanisms for sexual selection. The pre-copulatory mechanisms, including contest and scramble competition, are conditional mating tactics that are used based on an individual's phenotype. Males that are larger in size compete more in physical contests to access potential mates, while males that are smaller or medium-sized use scramble competition as a strategy by increasing their ranges to encounter potential mates. Age and size are positively correlated and as males mature, they grow in size and experience, monopolizing receptive females. Observations of broken canines, cuts, wounds and scars demonstrate the costs associated with contests and the importance of physical intra-sexual conflict within polygamous mating systems.

There is also post-copulatory male-male competition that has been documented in species within the genus Ursus. The presence of dual paternity within a litter implies that sperm competition may take place after copulation.

Another male strategy observed by male bears is sexually selected infanticide. This results in males killing the offspring of other males to directly and indirectly improve their own reproductive success. This can directly influence their success by mating with the female when she re-enters oestrus or indirectly by lowering intra-sexual competition with other males and resources.

== Female mate choice ==
Female choice is based on the cost of searching for a mate and the quality of a mate. Since females are induced ovulators, studies suggest that they may have control over the paternity of their offspring. This may be done through pre- and post-copulatory counter-strategies that involve cryptic female choice and sexually selected infanticide. The hypothesis of sexually selected infanticide is a female counterstrategy that can directly and indirectly improve their fitness. This is done by selecting for infanticidal males to enforce mate and offspring recognition and indirectly by mating with multiple males in order to have multiple paternity.

Within Ursus, there may be a high variation within the mating strategies observed by both females and males, demonstrating overall plasticity depending on external factors. This demonstrates the conditional mating tactics that male bears may consider based on their age and size, as well as the counter-strategies of females, including sexually selected infanticide and cryptic female choice.
