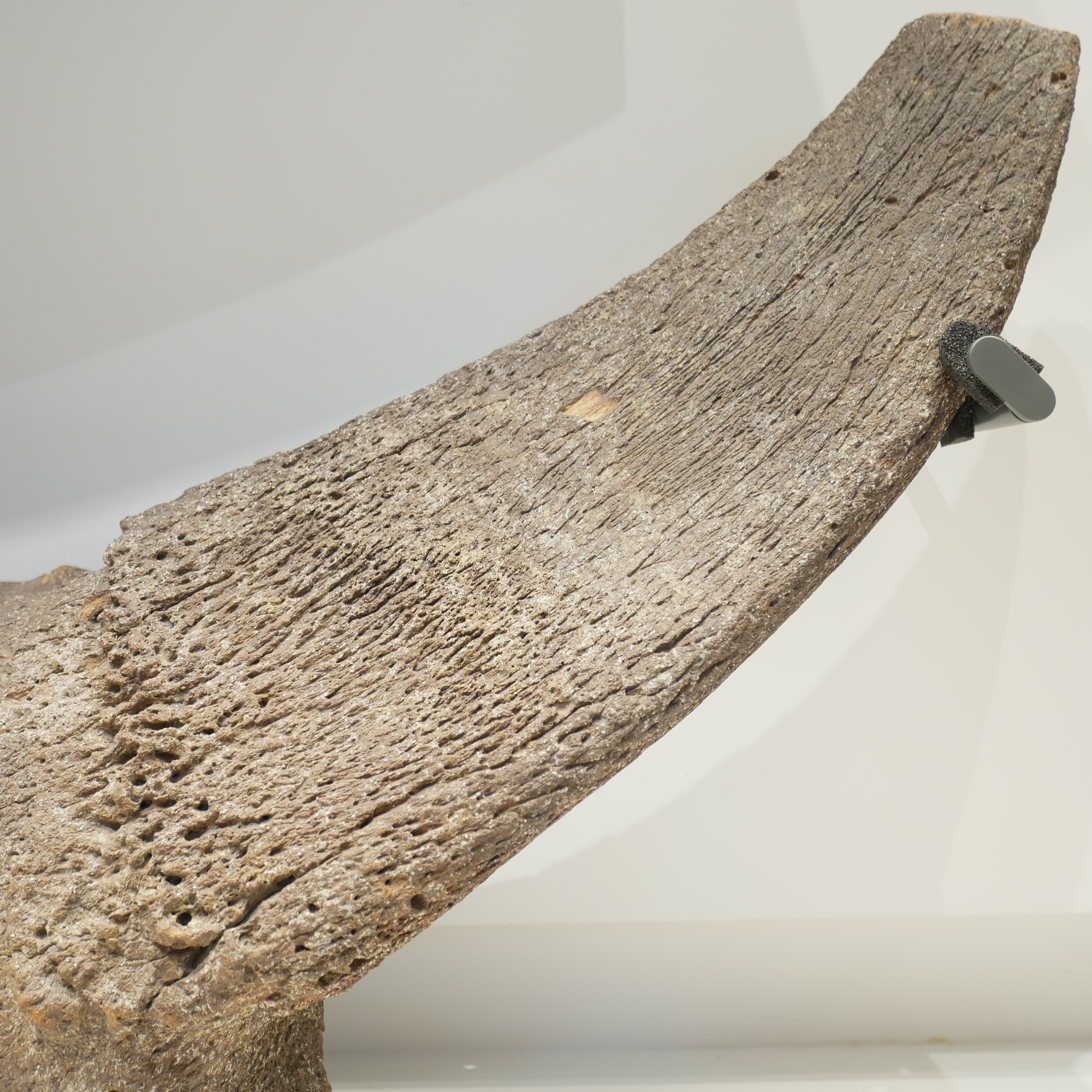
- Horn of Bubalus teilhardi（exhibited in National Taiwan Museum）

Scientific classification
- Kingdom: Animalia
- Phylum: Chordata
- Class: Mammalia
- Order: Artiodactyla
- Family: Bovidae
- Subfamily: Bovinae
- Genus: Bubalus
- Species: †B. teilhardi

Binomial name
- †Bubalus teilhardi Young, 1932

= Bubalus teilhardi =

Bubalus teilhardi Temporal range: 0.126–0.012 Ma Middle Pleistocene to Late Pleistocene

Extinct species of mammal

Bubalus teilhardi is an extinct species of water buffalo that existed during the Middle to Late Pleistocene in North China, East China, and the Penghu Channel of Taiwan. It is included in the Penghu fauna.

== Discovery ==
The discovery of Bubalus teilhardi was first published in 1932 by Chinese paleontologist Yang Chung-Chien and French geologist Pierre Teilhard de Chardin. The fossil specimens were found at Peking Man Site in Longgu Mountain, Zhoukoudian Village, Fangshan District, located approximately 48 kilometers southwest of Beijing. This site, also referred to as "Zhoukoudian Locality 1," is the same location where the Peking Man skullcap was discovered in 1929. Subsequently, numerous findings of Bubalus teilhardi have been recorded at the Zhoukoudian Locality 13.

The specific epithet "teilhardi" is named after the French geologist Teilhard, in recognition of his contributions to the study of vertebrate paleontology of China. In addition to Beijing, fossils of Bubalus teilhardi have also been found in Shaanxi, Jiangsu, and Zhejiang. Among the approximately ten extinct buffalo species in China, Bubalus teilhardi is the second-widest distributed species, surpassed only by Bubalus wansjocki. However, there have been no fossil discoveries of Bubalus teilhardi in South China so far.

In 1995, researchers from the National Museum of Natural Science, Taiwan salvaged a skull fossil of Bubalus teilhardi in the Penghu Channel. Based on the morphology of its skull, horn core and maxillary teeth, it bears a resemblance to the holotype described from the Zhoukoudian Locality 1 in 1932. The discovery of Bubalus teilhardi in the Penghu fauna indicates that during the Pleistocene, when the sea level dropped, Taiwan was connected to mainland China, allowing this species to migrate to Taiwan via a land bridge.

== Morphology ==
Bubalus teilhardi is a larger species among the Bubalus genus. It has a relatively wide inter-orbital region, a domed frontal region, and a sloping facial profile. Behind the horns, the cranium is longer, the top and occipital regions exhibit a significant posterior convexity, and the occipital crest is well-developed. The two horns extend horizontally backward in a narrower crescent or wide V shape, with a flat front and slightly concave upper surface. The cross section of the base of the horn core resembles an acute triangle, giving an overall slender appearance.

Some research suggests that the Bubalus tingi discovered in 1925 should be classified as a subspecies of Bubalus teilhardi.

== Evolution and phylogenetic tree ==
Paleontologist Yang Chung-Chien analyzed the cranium and horn morphology of several Chinese buffalo fossils and classified them into two major branches: the Bubalus teilhardi with slender horn cores and the Bubalus brevicornis with thick and short horn cores. Subsequently, other studies further supplemented this classification by suggesting that the Bubalus tingi with slender horn cores represents a separate evolutionary branch derived from Bubalus teilhardi, while the other Chinese buffalo belong to the branch of Bubalus brevicornis.

The following is a phylogenetic tree of the Bubalus genus based on cranial characteristics reconstructed in 2008:

- - Leptobos †
  - Bubalus teilhardi †
  - Bubalus tingi †
- - Bubalus brevicornis †
  - - Bubalus mephistophele †
    - - Bubalus guzhenensis †
      - - Bubalus wansjocki †
        - - Bubalus fudi †
          - - Bubalus youngi †
            - - Bubalus triangulus †
              - - Bubalus bubalis
                - Bubalus bubalus
