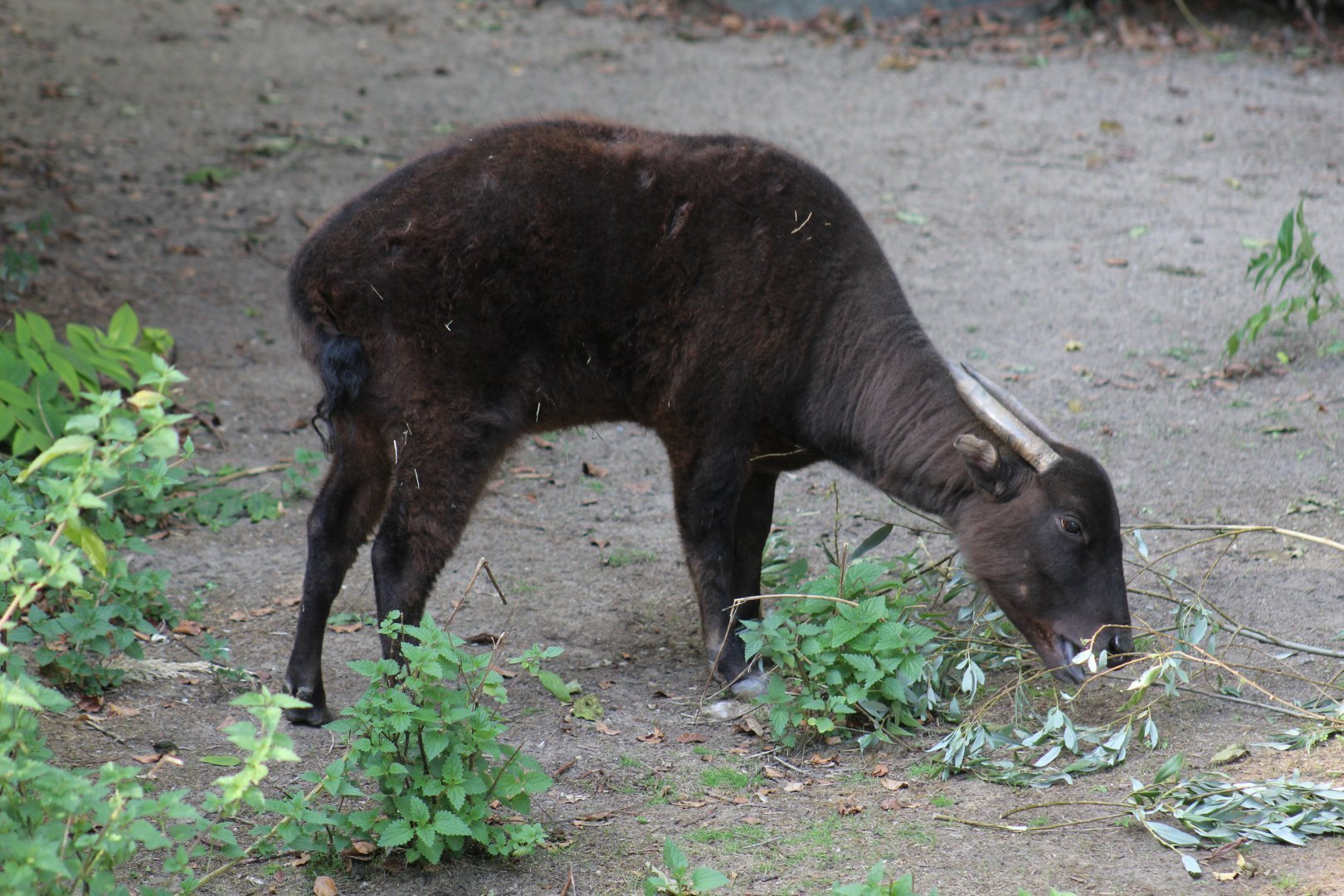
- Mountain anoa (B. quarlesi) at the Krefeld Zoo, Krefeld, Germany

Conservation status
- Endangered (IUCN 3.1)
- CITES Appendix I

Scientific classification
- Kingdom: Animalia
- Phylum: Chordata
- Class: Mammalia
- Order: Artiodactyla
- Family: Bovidae
- Subfamily: Bovinae
- Genus: Bubalus
- Subgenus: Anoa
- Species: B. quarlesi

Binomial name
- Bubalus quarlesi Ouwens, 1910

Synonyms
- Anoa quarlesi

= Mountain anoa =

Species of dwarf buffalo

The mountain anoa (Bubalus quarlesi) also known as Quarles anoa, is a species of dwarf buffalo endemic to Sulawesi. Its closest relative is the lowland anoa, and it is still a debate as to whether the two are the same species or not. It is also related to the water buffalo, which is also in the genus Bubalus.

== Taxonomy ==
Skulls of anoa cannot be accurately identified as to species, and there is likely hybridizing and interbreeding between the mountain anoa and lowland anoa in the zoo population. It is a debate as to whether the two species are different due to them occurring together in many different areas, as well as interbreeding in some areas. A study of the mtDNA of ten specimens from different localities found a high mitochondrial genetic diversity between individuals identified as one or the other species, indicating support for recognition as two species.

Both species of anoa appear to have been closely related to the extinct Bubalus grovesi of southern Sulawesi.

== Description ==
Standing at only 70 cm (28 in) at the shoulder, the mountain anoa is the smallest of all living wild cattle, being slightly smaller even than the lowland anoa. Both species typically weigh between 150–300 kg (330–660 lb). Compared to the lowland anoa, the mountain anoa have longer, woolier hair which moults every year, showing faint spots on the head, neck, and limbs. According to Groves (1969), the mountain anoa can be distinguished from other species by its smaller size and thick, woolly coat which is sometimes white on its face and legs. The cross-sections of its horns are round. They are similar in appearance to miniature water buffalo.

Both anoa species are found on the island of Sulawesi and the nearby island of Buton in Indonesia and live in undisturbed rainforest areas. They live singly or in pairs, rather than in herds like most cattle, except when the cows are about to give birth. Little is known of their life cycle in the wild. However in captivity they have a life expectancy of 20–30 years. Anoa take two to three years before they reach sexual maturity, have one calf a year, and have very rarely been seen to have more.

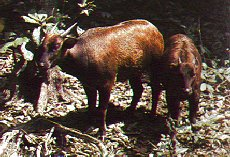
Mountain anoa

== Conservation ==
Both species of anoa have been classified as endangered since the 1960s and the populations continue to decrease. Fewer than 5,000 animals of each species likely remain. The leading causes of their population decline are hunting by local villagers for meat as well as habitat loss. In areas where the local people are unaware of environmentalism, they are open to dialogue with researchers regarding their harvests and hunting practices. In areas where an awareness of conservation issues have permeated however, the villagers will be dishonest about their activities.

Logging is a big threat as both species prefer core forested habitats that are far away from humans and the influences that come with them. By logging, humans create more fragmented habitats and, as a result, a decrease in the area in which the anoa can breed and live. This habitat fragmentation also alters the natural mixing of populations of the anoa. This may lead to a loss in genetic diversity between the two species and, over time, could also lead to their decline.

It is listed as an endangered species under the United States Endangered Species Act.
