= Phu Phra Bat Historical Park =

UNESCO World Heritage Site in Udon Thani province, Thailand

UNESCO World Heritage Site
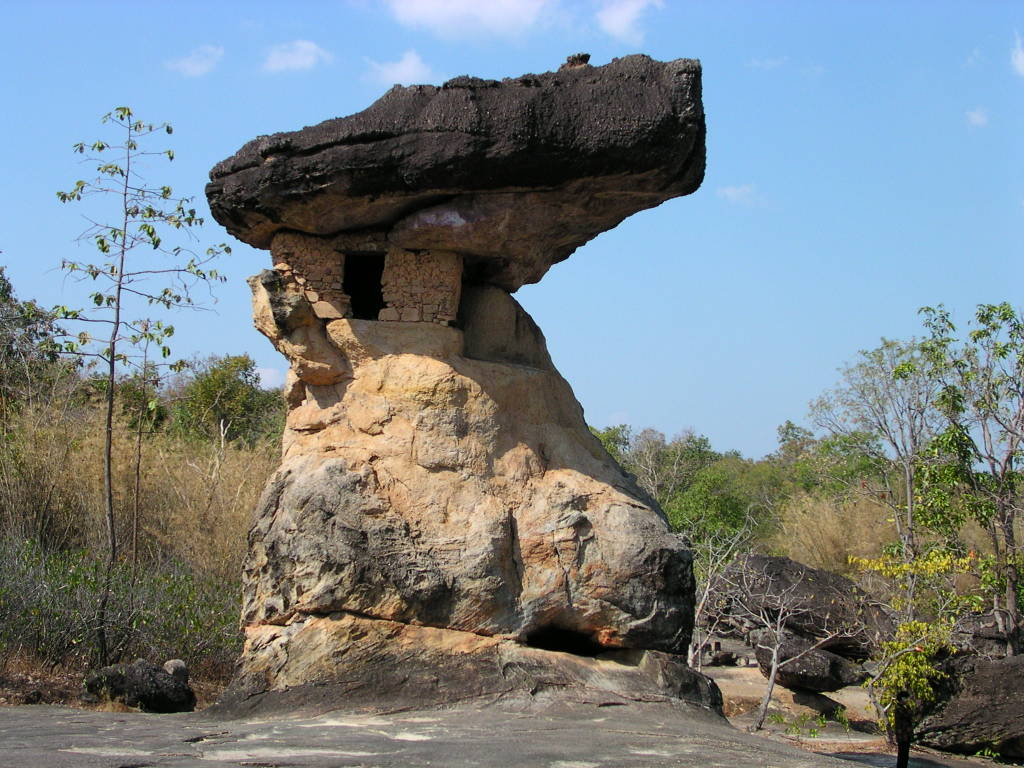
- Ho Nang Usa

- Location within Thailand
- Location: Ban Phue, Udon Thani, Thailand
- Part of: Phu Phrabat, a testimony to the Sīma stone tradition of the Dvaravati period
- Criteria: Cultural: (iii)(v)
- Reference: 1507
- Inscription: 2024 (46th Session)
- Area: 575.976 ha (1,423.27 acres)
- Buffer zone: 568.078 ha (1,403.75 acres)
- Coordinates: 17°43′51.8″N 102°21′22.6″E

Phu Phra Bat (Thai: ภูพระบาท, pronounced [pʰūː pʰráʔ bàːt]; Northeastern Thai: ภูพระบาท, pronounced [pʰûː pʰàʔ bàːt]) is a historical park in Ban Phue District, Udon Thani Province, Thailand. The park's distinguishing feature is its unusual rock formations around which religious shrines have been constructed. Some formations also feature prehistoric rock paintings.

The park was established by the Fine Arts Department of Thailand in 1991.

== Geography ==
Phu Phra Bat is located in the western zone of the Phu Phan Mountains between Udon Thani and Nong Khai, at a distance of about 65 kilometres (40 mi) from each city. The park's area is 1,200 acres (4.9 km^{2}) and is entirely within the Phu Phra Bat Buabok Forest Park.

== Rock formations ==
The unusual rock formations in the park include spires, massive boulders and balanced rocks and form the backdrop for the prehistoric art and religious shrines created there. The geological origins of these rocks are thought to be from under-sea erosion that occurred fifteen million years ago.

== Prehistoric art ==
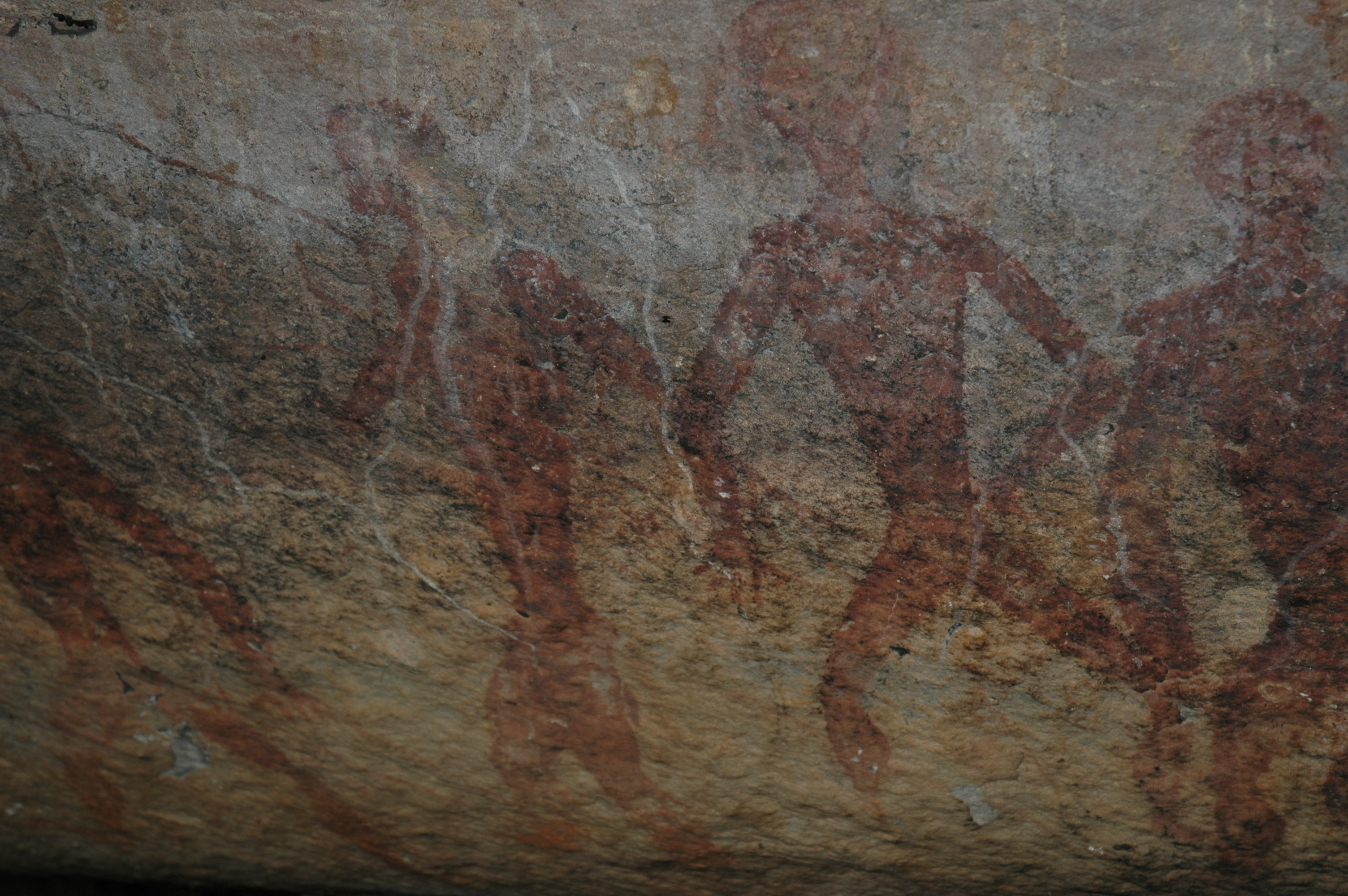
Tham Khon prehistoric rock painting

Prehistoric art paintings on the rocks can best be seen where some rocks have formed a natural shelter. Others have faded considerably. The formations named Tham Wua and Tham Khon are particularly good examples; in the former oxen are depicted, the latter has human figures. The park's rock paintings are believed to date from 6,000 years ago.

== Mythology ==
Phu Phra Bat's rock formations are the setting for a local legend about a king, his daughter and her suitor. The park's most striking rock formation, Ho Nang Usa, is where the overprotective king forced his beautiful daughter to live. Despite her confinement, she was able to get a message out to her suitor prince and the two were married in defiance of her father.

== Religious shrines ==
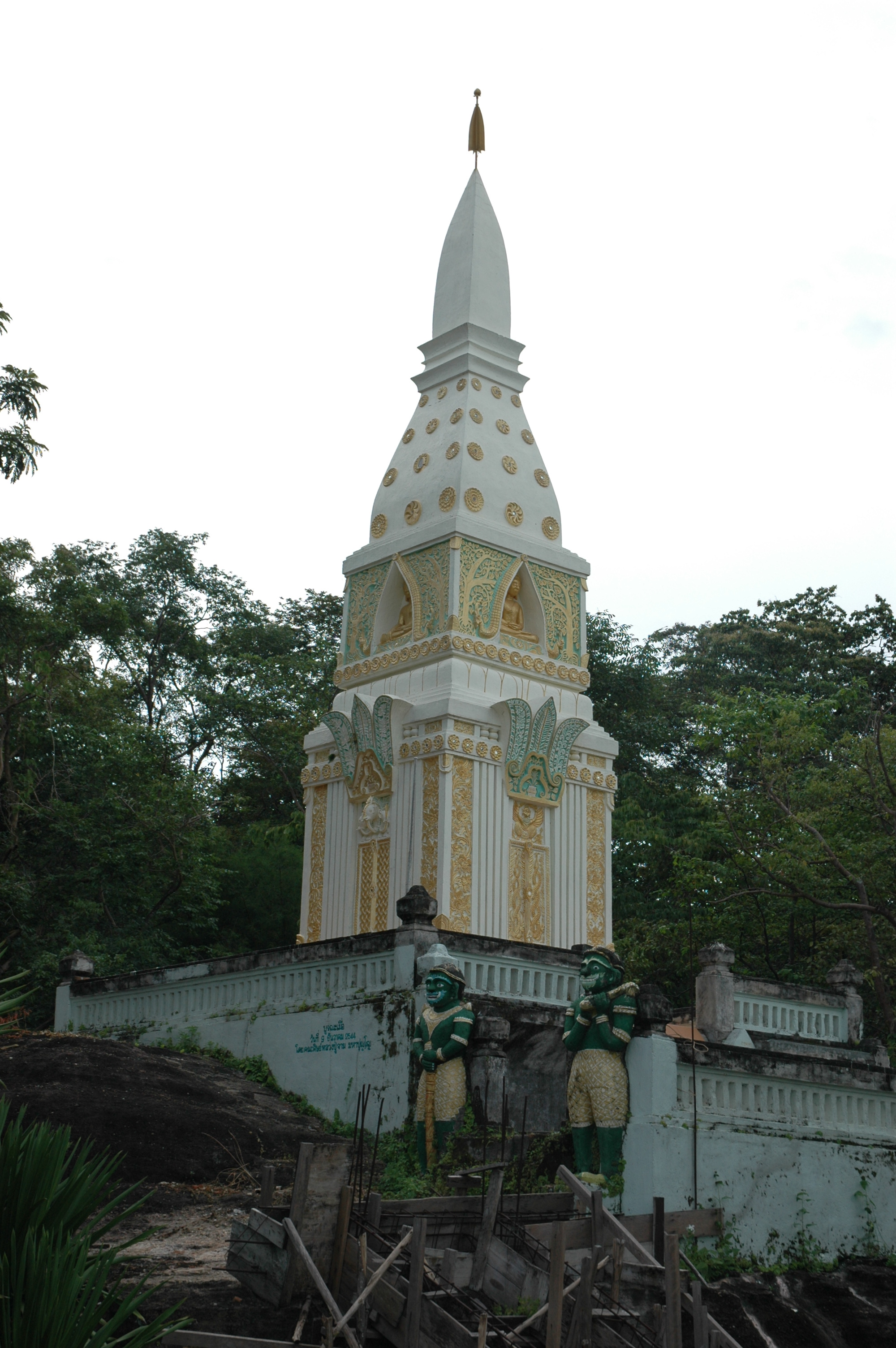
Shrine at Phu Phra Bat

Ho Nang Usa is one of a number of the rock formations where a shrine has been constructed. Early shrines date to the Dvaravati period in the seventh to tenth centuries. Shrines feature Hindu and Buddhist influences.

The park's most significant shrine is Wat Phra Putthabaht Bua Bok, where a Cham–Khmer style chedi covers a chamber housing a sandstone Buddha footprint. The shrine is a pilgrimage site with an annual festival held in March.

== See also ==
- Bai sema
- Prehistoric painting
- List of World Heritage Sites in Thailand
