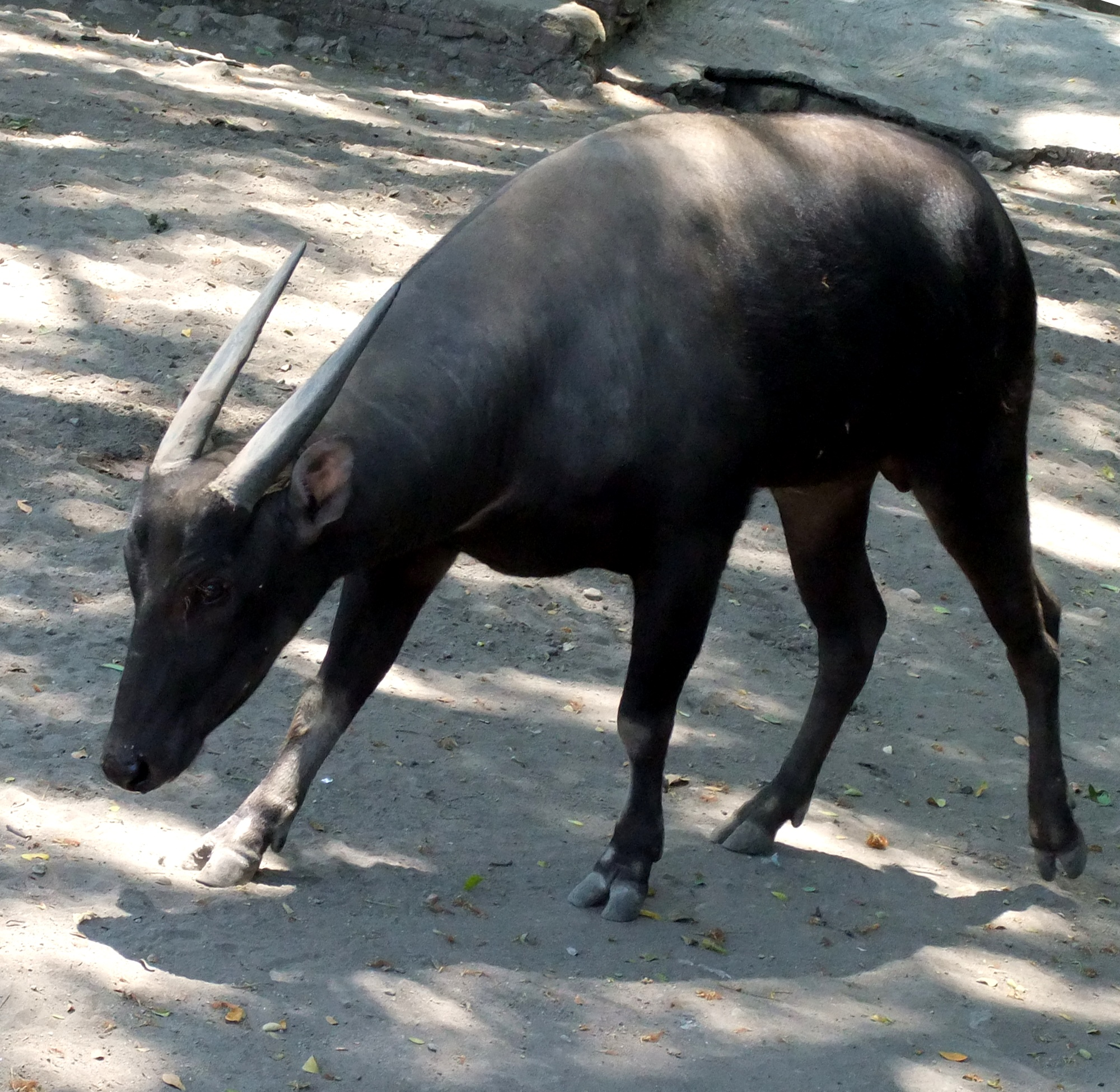
- Lowland anoa (B. depressicornis) at the Surabaya Zoo, Surabaya, East Java, Indonesia

Conservation status
- Endangered (IUCN 3.1)
- CITES Appendix I

Scientific classification
- Kingdom: Animalia
- Phylum: Chordata
- Class: Mammalia
- Infraclass: Placentalia
- Order: Artiodactyla
- Family: Bovidae
- Subfamily: Bovinae
- Genus: Bubalus
- Subgenus: Anoa
- Species: B. depressicornis

Binomial name
- Bubalus depressicornis Smith, 1827

Synonyms
- Anoa depressicornis

= Lowland anoa =

Species of dwarf buffalo

The lowland anoa (Bubalus depressicornis) is a species of buffalo endemic to Sulawesi. Its closest relative is the mountain anoa, and it is still a debate as to whether the two are the same species or not. It is also related to the water buffalo, and both are classified in the genus Bubalus.

== Taxonomy ==
Skulls of anoa cannot be accurately identified as to species, and there is likely hybridizing and interbreeding between the mountain anoa and lowland anoa in the zoo population. It is questioned as to whether the two species were actually different due to them occurring together in many different areas, as well as some interbreeding. A study of the mtDNA of ten specimens from different localities found a high mitochondrial genetic diversity between individuals identified as one or the other species, indicating support for recognition as two species.

The extinct Bubalus grovesi of southern Sulawesi appears to be a close relative of both anoa species.

== Description ==
The lowland anoa is a small bovid, only slightly larger than the mountain anoa. It stands barely over 90 cm (35 in) at the shoulder and weighs between 150–300 kg (330–660 lb). It is usually solitary, living in lowland forests, browsing on plants and understory. According to Groves (1969), the lowland anoa can be told apart from the other species by being larger, having a triangular horn cross-section, having sparse as opposed to thick and woolly hair, and always having white markings on the face and legs.

Both anoa species are found on the island of Sulawesi and the nearby island of Buton in Indonesia and live in undisturbed rainforest areas. They only live singly or in pairs, rather than in herds like most cattle, except when the cows are about to give birth. Little is known about their life history as well. However, in captive individuals, they have a life expectancy of 20–30 years. Anoa take two to three years before they reach sexual maturity have one calf a year and have very rarely been seen to have more.

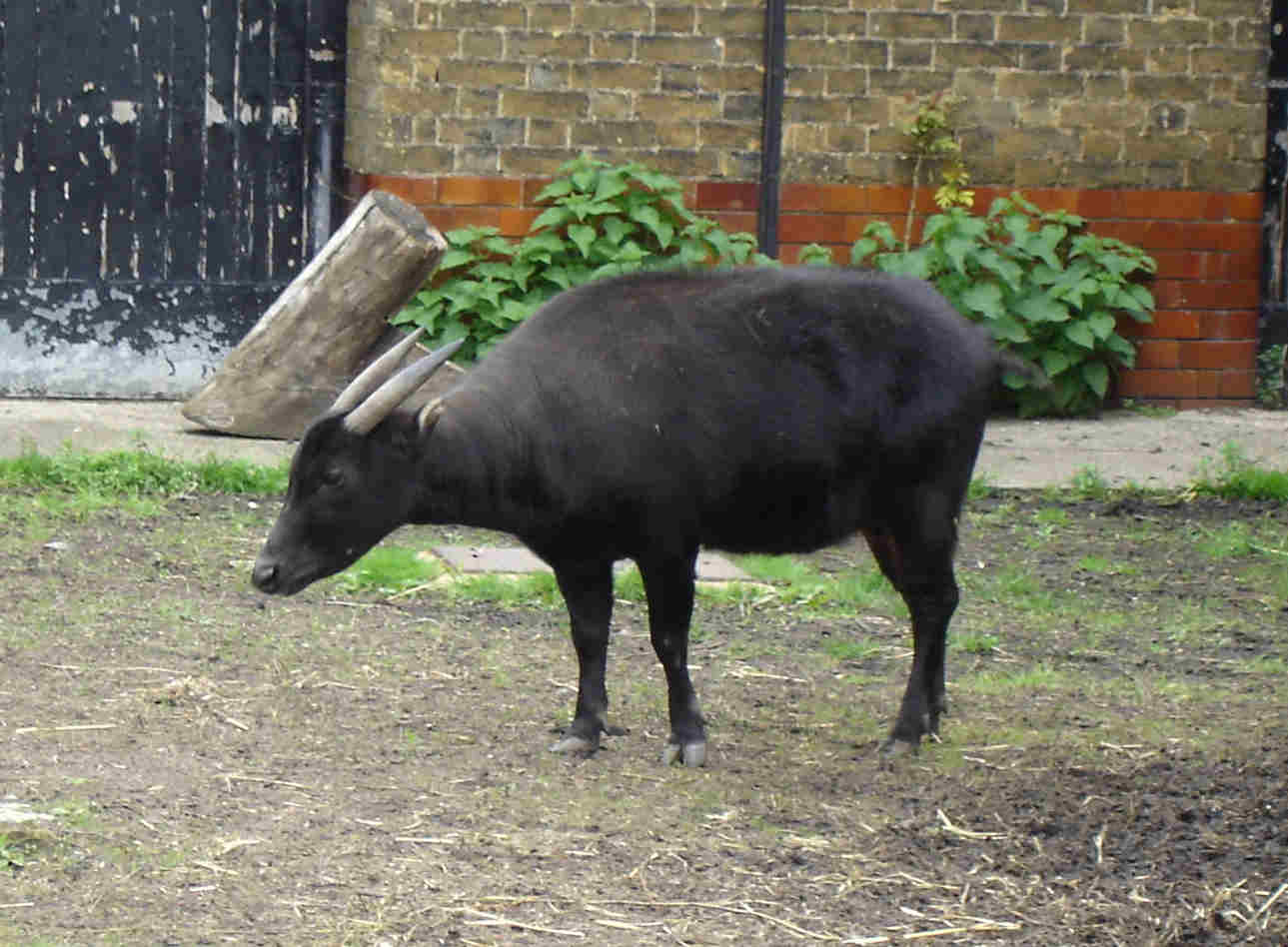
A lowland anoa in London Zoo, England

== Conservation ==
Both species of anoa have been classified as endangered since the 1960s and the populations continue to decrease. Fewer than 5,000 animals of each species likely remain. Reasons for their decline include hunting for hides, horns, and meat by the local peoples and loss of habitat due to the advancement of settlement. Currently, hunting is the more serious factor in most areas.

The leading cause of their population decline is hunting by local villagers for meat, with habitat loss also being significant. One benefit of the lack of knowledge about the legal status of what they are doing is that villagers are open to communication with researchers on their harvests and hunting practices; where awareness of conservation issues has penetrated, villagers will lie about their activities.

Logging is a large issue because both species prefer core forested habitats that are far away from humans and the influences that come with them. By logging, humans create much more fragmented habitats and, therefore, a decrease in the area where the anoa can breed and live. This habitat fragmentation also alters the natural mixing of populations of the anoa. This may lead to a loss in genetic diversity between the two species and, over time, could also lead to their decline.
