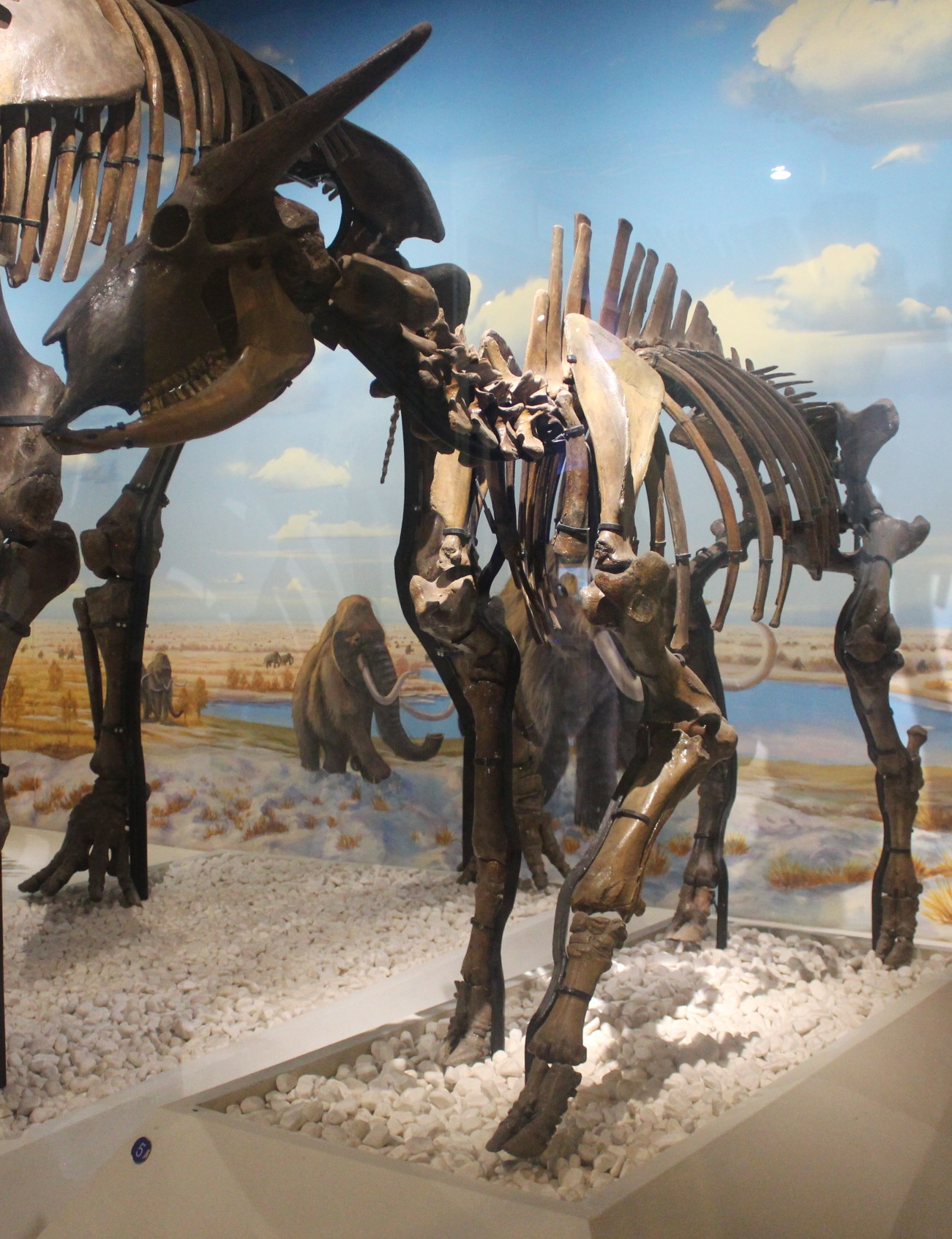
- Skeleton on display at the National Natural History Museum of China

Scientific classification
- Kingdom: Animalia
- Phylum: Chordata
- Class: Mammalia
- Infraclass: Placentalia
- Order: Artiodactyla
- Family: Bovidae
- Subfamily: Bovinae
- Genus: Bubalus
- Species: †B. wansjocki

Binomial name
- †Bubalus wansjocki Boule & Chardin, 1928

Synonyms
- Bubalus wansijocki (lapsus calami); Bubalus wangsjoki (lapsus calami)

= Bubalus wansjocki =

Bubalus wansjocki Temporal range: Late Pleistocene

Extinct species of bovid

Bubalus wansjocki is an extinct species of buffalo belonging to the genus Bubalus (which includes water buffalo) known from northern China during the Late Pleistocene.

== Taxonomy ==
The species was first described in 1928 by Marcellin Boule and Pierre Teilhard de Chardin. The species was named after the Mongol landowner Wansjock, who had assisted their colleague Émile Licent in paleontological excavations in the Ordos region.

A 2014 study on extinct Chinese buffalo species suggested that the related Bubalus fudi is a subspecies of B. wansjocki. A 2026 mitochondrial DNA study of found that that Bubalus wansjocki was part of the same clade that included the Chinese Holocene Bubalus mephistopheles, which led the authors to suggest that the two nominal species represented morphological variants of the same species. Their mitochondrial genomes were most closely related to anoa among living Bubalus species (though there is discordance between mitochondrial DNA trees and nuclear DNA trees in Bubalus), implying that the B. wansjocki/mephistopheles lineage is not closely related to or ancestral to swamp buffalo.

== Description ==
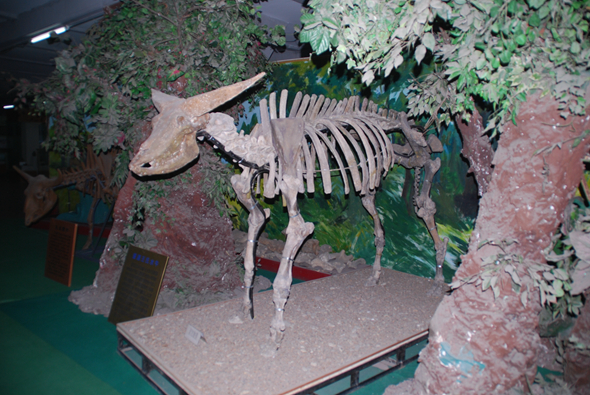
Skeleton of B. wansjocki

Bubalus wansjocki is a relatively large species. Like other Chinese Pleistocene Bubalus species as well as the European Bubalus murrensis, the horn cores have a triangular cross section, rather than a rounded one as found in the living Bubalus arnee. Compared to the European water buffalo, the horns of Bubalus wansjocki are shorter but more massive.

== Paleoecology ==
Bubalus wansjocki is known from remains spanning from Heilongjiang and Liaoning in Northeast China in the east, westwards to Inner Mongolia.^{including table S3}

Many of the faunal assemblages associated with Bubalus wansjocki indicate that it lived in a relatively warm and moist environment, with a mixture of grassland, forest and swamp. However, the period it lived in was associated with a cold environment and other assemblages its remains have been found in show it and other warm-adapted animals together with cold-adapted ones including woolly mammoth and woolly rhinoceros. It is now believed that northern China went through many short, abrupt periods of very warm and very cold climate change during the Late Pleistocene. It has been argued that Bubalus wansjocki may have only temporarily occupied Northern China during warm interstadials.
