= Bubalus mephistopheles =

Bubalus mephistopheles Temporal range: 1–0.0012 Ma Late Pleistocene - Late Holocene
- Bubalus mephistopheles skeleton

Scientific classification
- Kingdom: Animalia
- Phylum: Chordata
- Class: Mammalia
- Order: Artiodactyla
- Family: Bovidae
- Subfamily: Bovinae
- Genus: Bubalus
- Species: †B. mephistopheles

Binomial name
- †Bubalus mephistopheles (Hopwood, 1925)

Extinct species of bovid

Bubalus mephistopheles, also known as the short-horned water buffalo, is an extinct species of bovine that lived in China during the Pleistocene and Holocene. It survived into historic times, perhaps as recently as 1200 BC.

== Description ==
The short-horned water buffalo was first described in 1925. It is distinguished by its short, extremely triangular horn cores, which are crescent-shaped and gently curve inwards. The short-horned water buffalo is known with certainty to have disappeared during the Holocene. Although no direct radiometric dates are available, this species is present in a series of well-dated Neolithic and Bronze Age zooarchaeological deposits across southern, central and eastern China (from Yunnan to northern Henan).

== Domestication status ==
For many years since its description, the short-horned buffalo was considered a domesticated form of buffalo indigenous to China that played an integral part in the development of paddy rice cultivation in Neolithic and Bronze Age times. However such notions were challenged in the 2000s.

In 2004, fossils of the short-horned water buffalo from several Neolithic assemblages in China were compared with remains of domestic buffalo/cattle from Dholavira, an urban site of the Harappan civilization in South Asia dated to between 2600 - 1900 BC. At Dholavira, the ages of the bovines were categorized into six age-stages, ranging from infant (stage I) to adult (stage VI). Almost all the young bovines survived through stages I-III, but some were killed off before growth slowed down in stage IV and the rest mostly survived into full adulthood (stages V-VI). This pattern is consistent with the use of domestic animals for ploughing, hauling, and transport. In contrast, the three Neolithic assemblages from China all had large proportions of very young calves and some very old individuals, which most likely represents a pattern of hunting wild populations. Furthermore, wild and domestic buffaloes show a significant difference in body size, with wild buffaloes being much larger than domesticated ones. But a comparison from four different sites dated to 6000 - 1200 BC showed no reduction of body size in the B. mephistopheles populations during this period.

A 2008 study on the DNA sequences of B. mephistopheles showed that it was not a direct ancestor of domestic buffalo, although it was closely related. Domestic buffalo (Bubalus bubalis) were introduced into China from South Asia, most likely around the first millennium.

A 2026 mitochondrial DNA study of found that that Bubalus mephistopheles was part of the same clade that included Bubalus wansjocki from the Late Pleistocene of Northern China, which led the authors to suggest that the two nominal species represented morphological variants of the same species. Their mitochondrial genomes were found to be most closely related to anoa among living Bubalus species (though there is discordance between mitochondrial DNA trees and true ancestry trees in Bubalus), implying that the B. wansjocki/mephistopheles lineage is not closely related to or ancestral to swamp buffalo.

== Relationship with humans ==
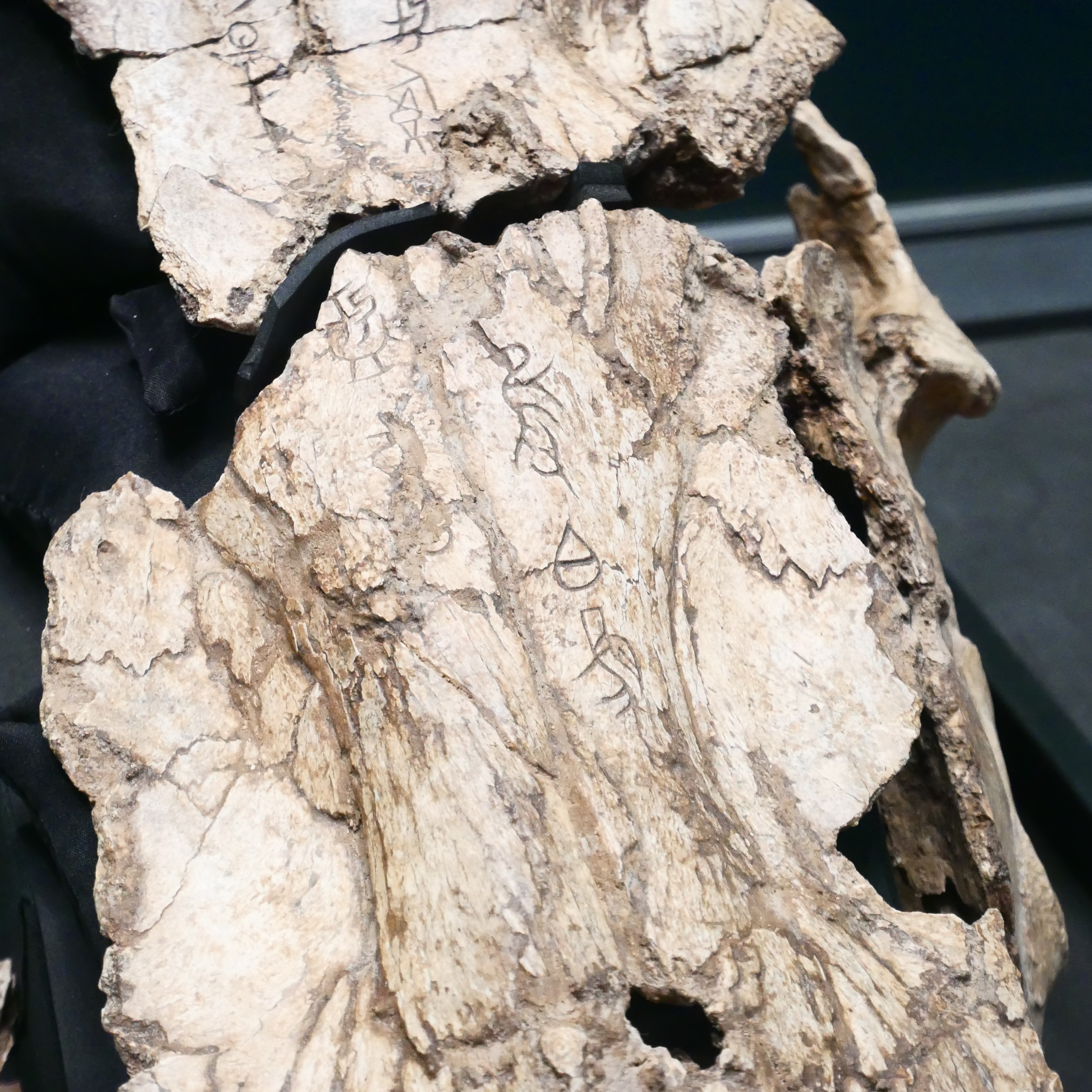
B. mephistopheles skull inscribed in oracle bone script.

During the Shang dynasty of Chinese history, B. mephistopheles bones were used in oracle bone divination, being observed in Yinxu and Zhoujiazhuang (周家莊).
