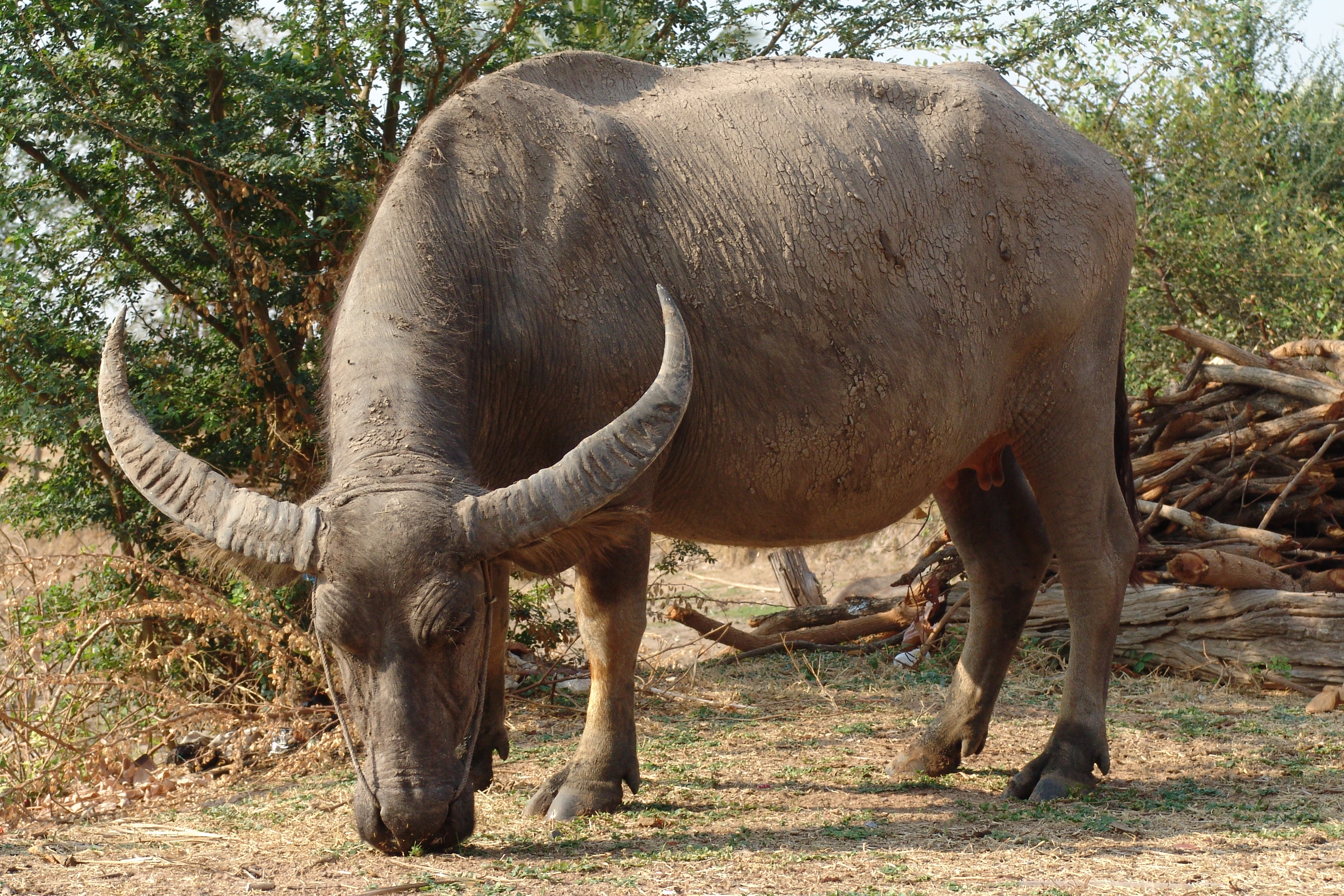

Scientific classification
- Kingdom: Animalia
- Phylum: Chordata
- Class: Mammalia
- Order: Artiodactyla
- Family: Bovidae
- Subfamily: Bovinae
- Subtribe: Bubalina
- Genus: Bubalus; C. H. Smith, 1827

Type species
- Bos bubalis Linnaeus, 1758

Species
- Bubalus arnee Bubalus bubalis Bubalus depressicornis Bubalus mindorensis Bubalus quarlesi

= Bubalus =

Genus of bovines

Bubalus is a genus of Asiatic bovines that was proposed by Charles Hamilton Smith in 1827. Bubalus and Syncerus form the subtribe Bubalina, the true buffaloes.

The International Code of Zoological Nomenclature and classification of domestic animals as species, subspecies, races or breeds has been discussed controversially for many years and was inconsistent between authors. Assessors of the Food and Agriculture Organization consider domestic water buffalo populations as breeds.

Bubalus species comprise the domestic water buffalo (B. bubalis), the wild water buffalo (B. arnee), the tamaraw (B. mindorensis), the lowland anoa (B. depressicornis), and the mountain anoa (B. quarlesi). The latter two anoa species were proposed to form a subgenus Anoa within Bubalus.

== Characteristics ==
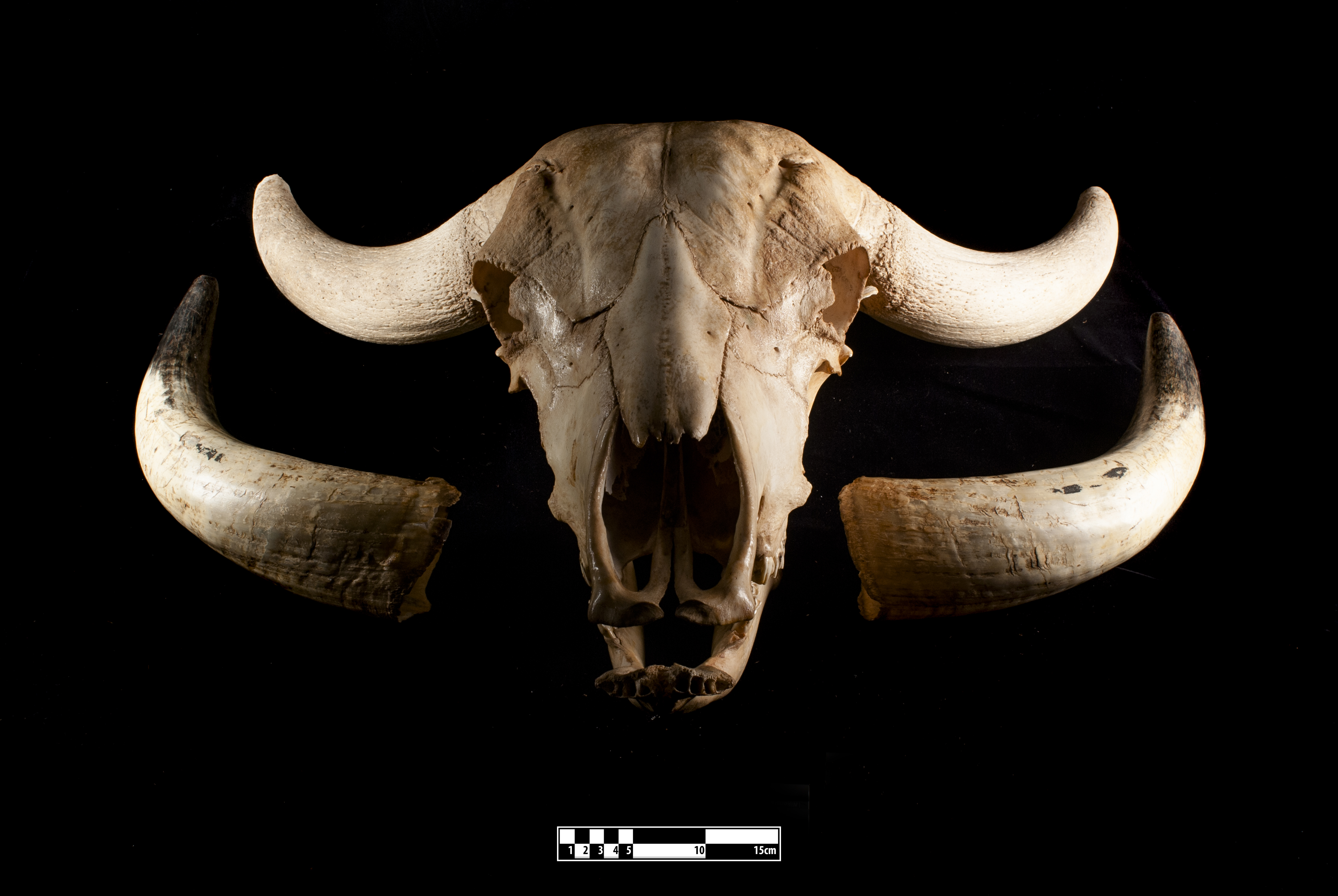
Bubalus skull

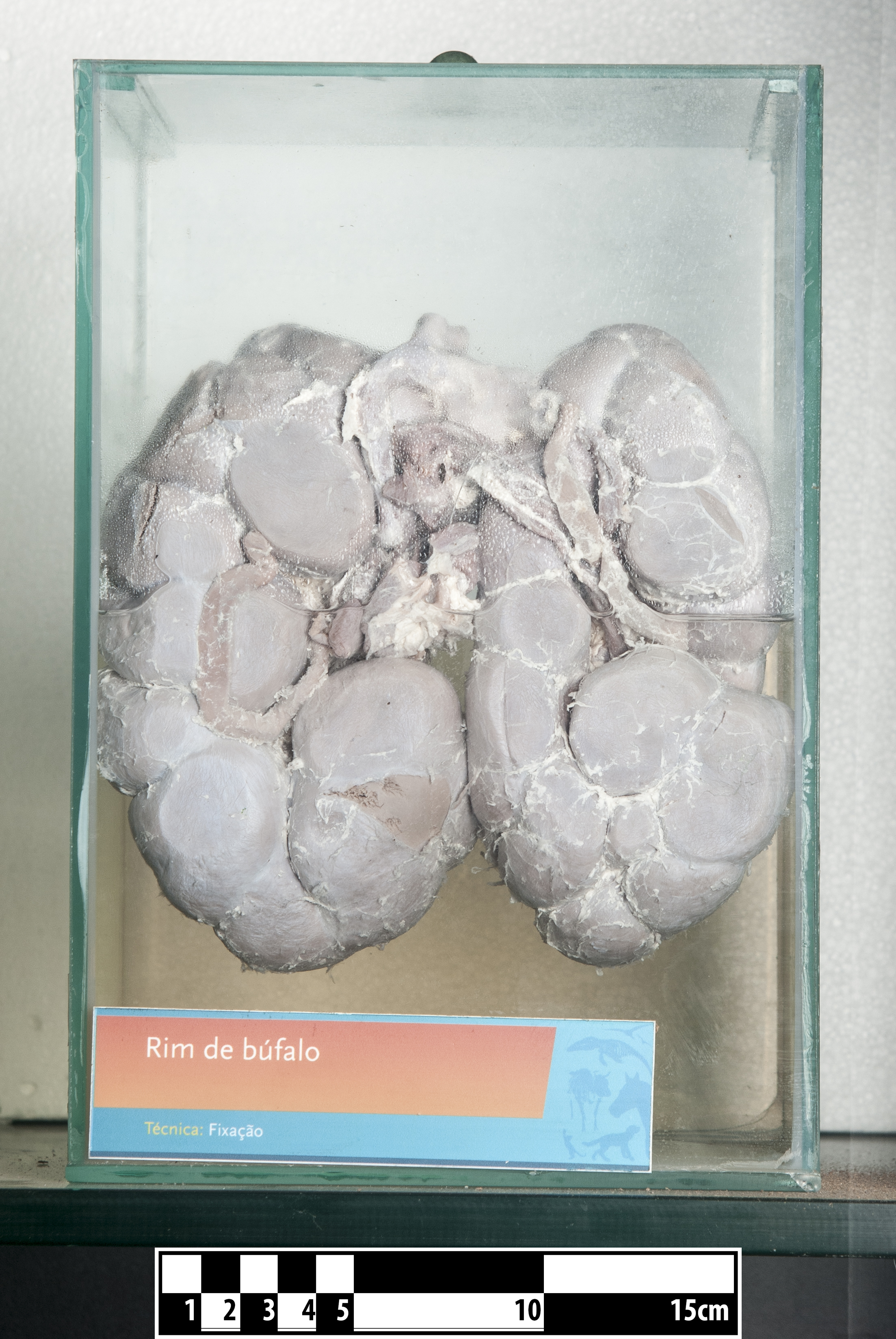
Kidney of a Bubalus

In 1827, Charles Hamilton Smith described Bubalus as low in proportion to the bulk with very solid limbs, a small dewlap and a long, slender tail; the head is large with a strong convex-shaped narrow forehead, large eyes and funnel-shaped ears; horns are lying flat or bending laterally with a certain direction to the rear; the female udder has four mammae. In 1913, Lydekker added that the line of back is nearly straight with 13 pairs of ribs; the tail is tufted and reaching about to the hocks; the horns are more or less markedly triangular for the greater part of their length and situated low down on the skull; the muzzle is broad, and the hair sparse in adults.

== Species ==
This genus comprises the following living species:

Image	Scientific name	Distribution
	Domestic water buffalo B. bubalis Linnaeus, 1758	Domestic in the Indian subcontinent, Southeast Asia, China, Italy and Romania; feral populations exist in South America and Australia
	Wild water buffalo B. arnee Kerr, 1792	Indian subcontinent and Southeast Asia
	Lowland anoa B. depressicornis Smith, 1827	Sulawesi in Indonesia
	Tamaraw B. mindorensis Heude, 1888	Mindoro in the Philippines
	Mountain anoa B. quarlesi Ouwens, 1910	Sulawesi

=== Valid names ===
The 2013 checklist of the Catalogue of Life lists as "accepted" five species binomina in the genus Bubalus:

- Bubalus bubalis Linnaeus, 1758
- Bubalus depressicornis Smith, 1827
- Bubalus mephistopheles Hopwood, 1925
- Bubalus mindorensis Heude, 1888
- Bubalus quarlesi Ouwens, 1910

Bubalus arnee is not listed here.

The Integrated Taxonomic Information System lists the same five species binomina as valid; it also lists as valid six subspecies of Bubalus bubalis:

- Bubalus bubalis arnee Kerr, 1792
- Bubalus bubalis bubalis Linnaeus, 1758
- Bubalus bubalis fulvus Blanford, 1891
- Bubalus bubalis kerabau Fitzinger, 1860
- Bubalus bubalis migona Deraniyagala, 1952
- Bubalus bubalis theerapati Groves, 1996

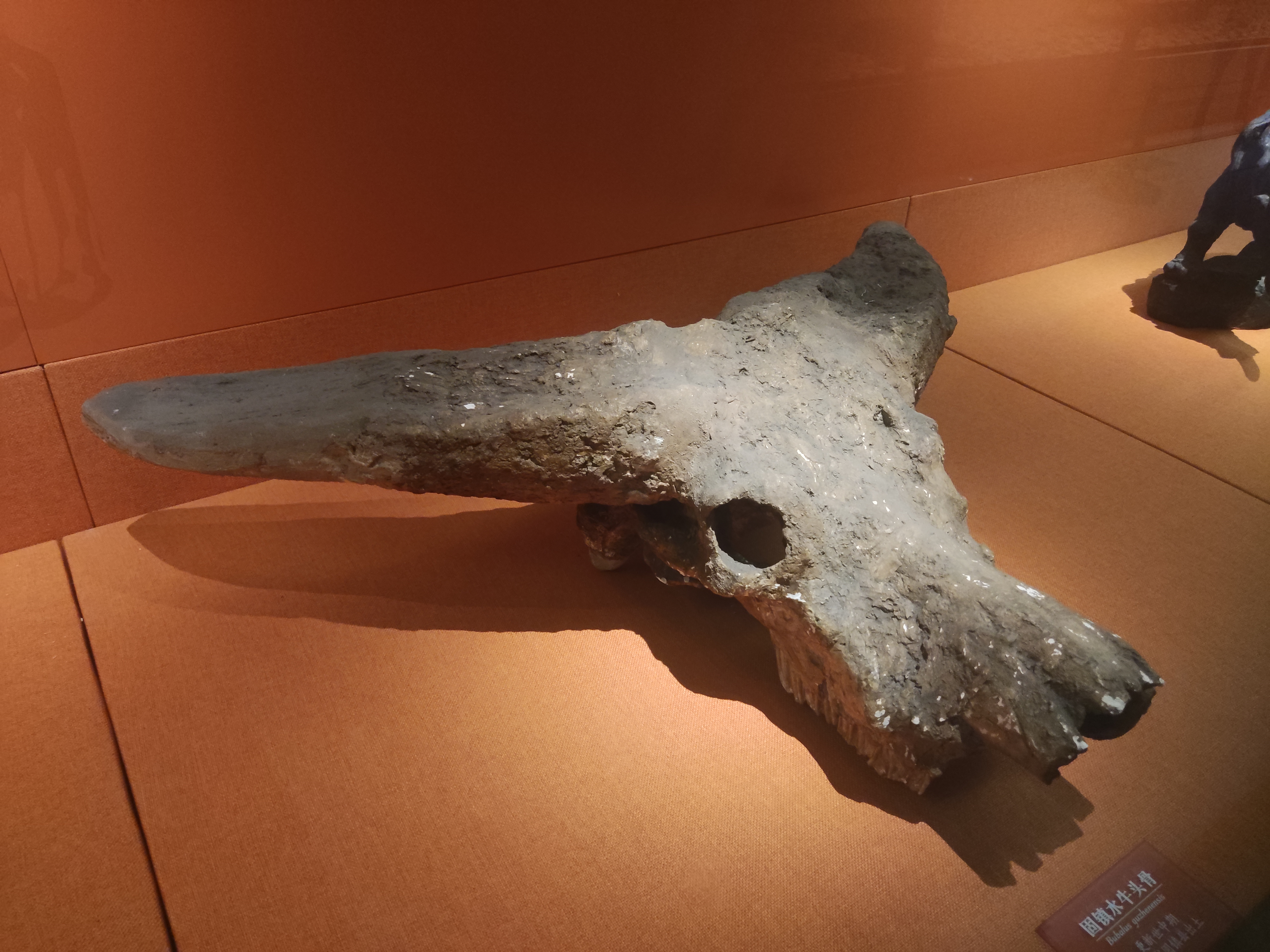
†Bubalus guzhenensis

=== Fossil species ===
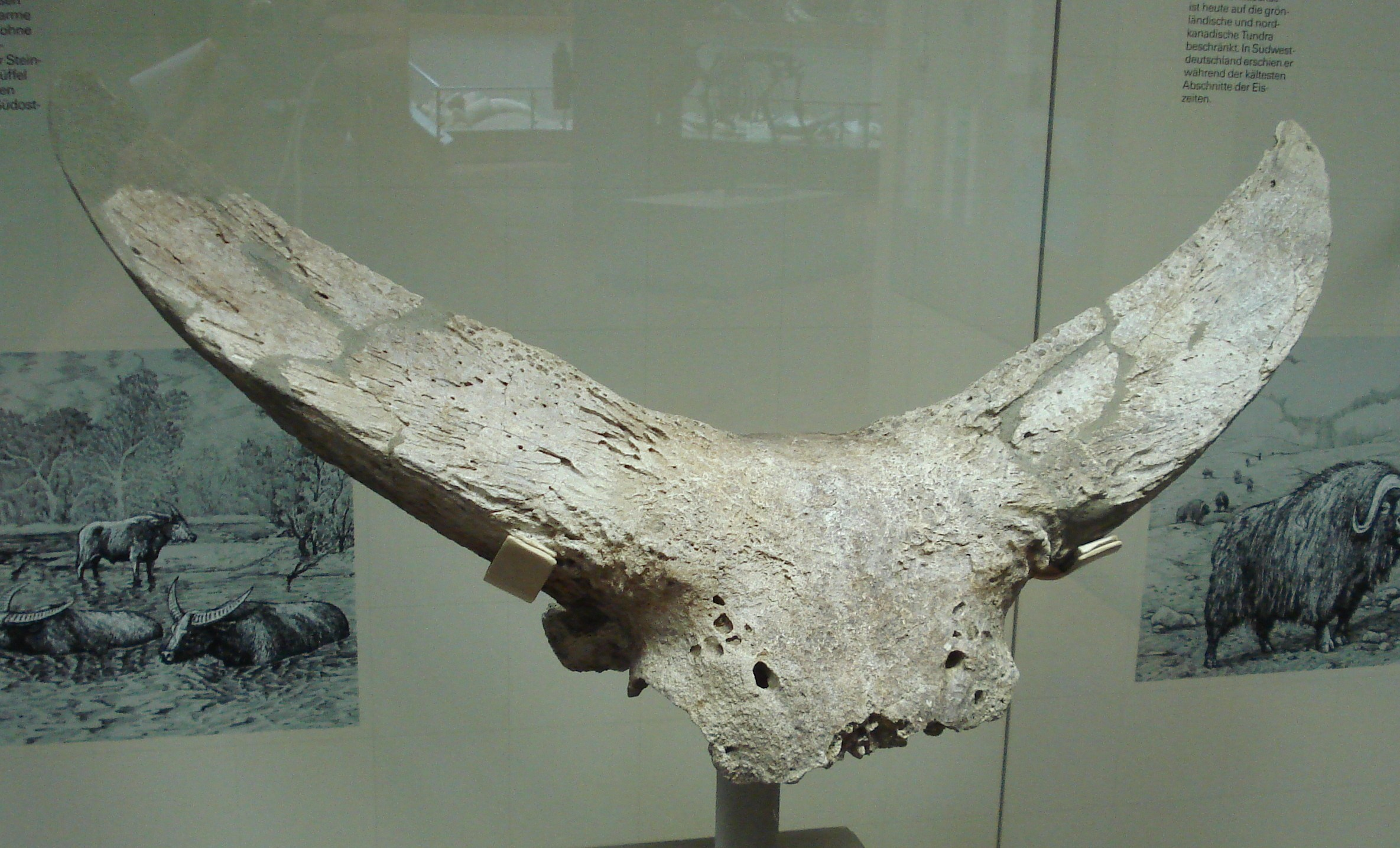
Bubalus murrensis horns

The following extinct fossil species have been described:

- Bubalus brevicornis - Young, 1936
- Bubalus cebuensis (Cebu tamaraw) - Croft, Heaney, Flynn and Bautista, 2006
- Bubalus fudi - Guo, 2008 - (possibly a subspecies of Bubalus wansijocki)
- Bubalus grovesi - Rozzi, 2017
- Bubalus mephistopheles (Short-horned water buffalo) - Hopwood, 1925
- Bubalus murrensis (European water buffalo) - Berckhemer, 1927
- Bubalus palaeokerabau (Long-horned Javan water buffalo) - E. Dubois, 1908
- Bubalus platyceros - Lydekker, 1877
- Bubalus teilhardi - Young, 1932
- Bubalus wansjocki - Chardin, 1928
- Bubalus youngi - Chow and Hsu, 1957

== See also ==
- List of water buffalo breeds
