= Caves in the Maros-Pangkep karst =

Cave and archaeological site in Indonesia

Pettakere Cave
- Leang Pettakere
- Leang-Leang Caves
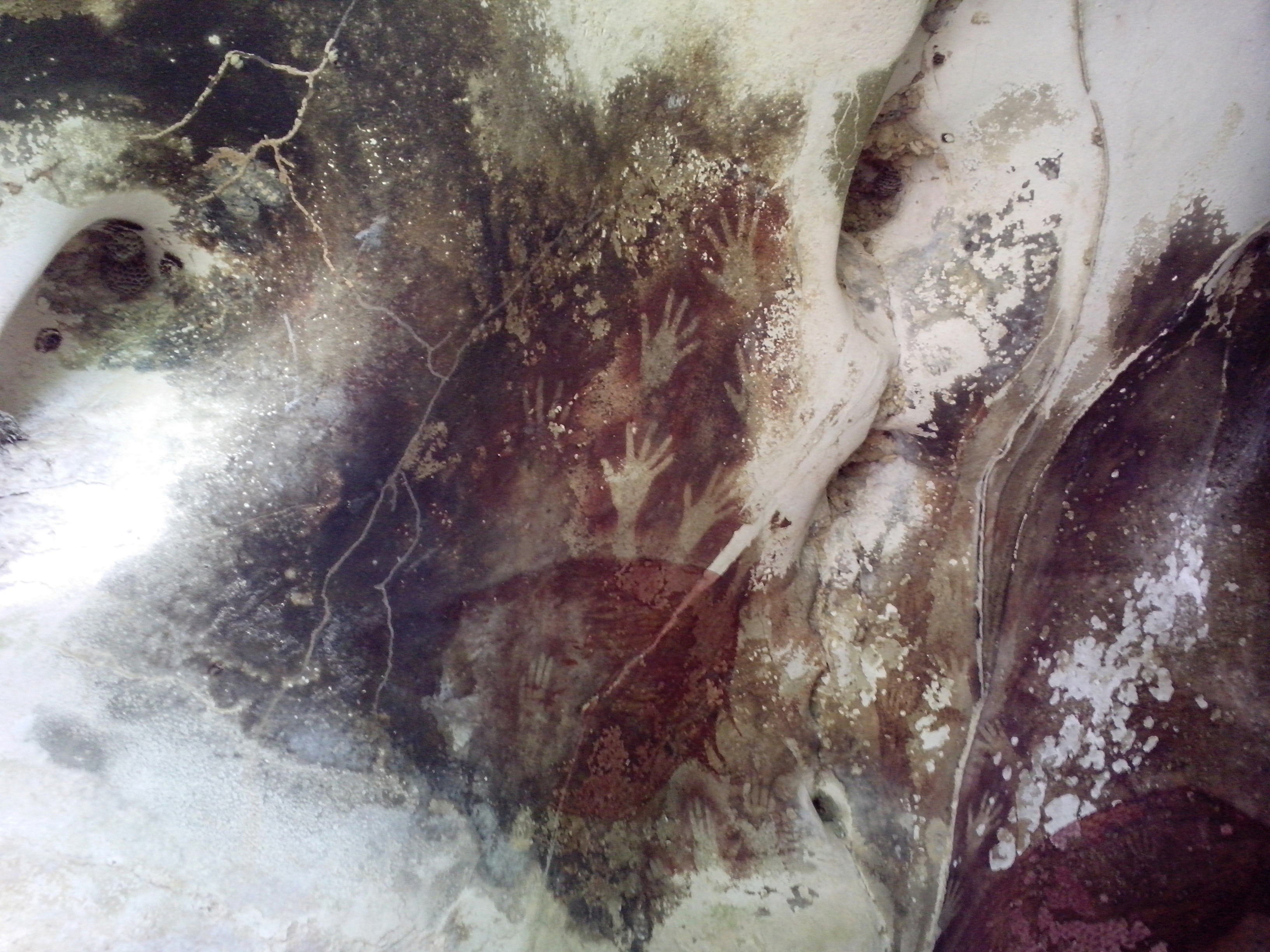
- Hand stencils on the wall of a cave in Leang-Leang.

- location in Indonesia Caves in the Maros-Pangkep karst (Indonesia)
- Interactive map of Pettakere Cave
- 5°0′11″S 119°41′40″E
- Type: Limestone caves with prehistoric rock art
- Periods: Palaeolithic
- Associated with: Paleo-humans
- Location: Maros Regency, South Sulawesi, Indonesia
- Region: Southeast Asia
- Part of: Prehistoric place Leang-Leang

History
- Built: c. 45,500 years ago
- Abandoned: c. 35,400 years ago

Site notes
- Material: limestone karst
- Excavation dates: 1973
- Archaeologists: Ian Glover
- Public access: Yes

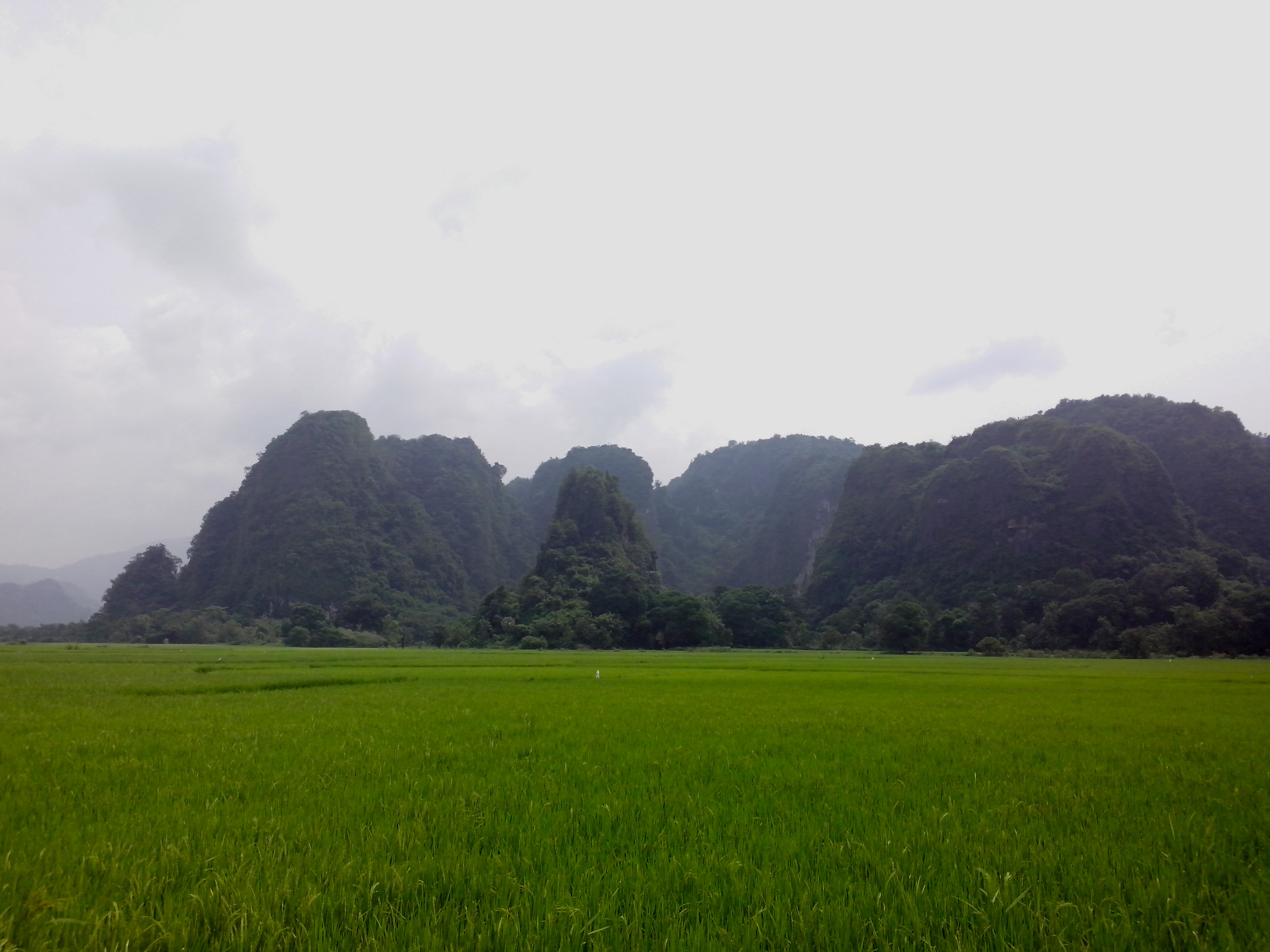
Karst landscape near the Leang-Leang Caves.

The caves in the Maros-Pangkep karst or Leang-Leang Caves (from the Makassarese word for "many caves") are located in Maros Regency, South Sulawesi, Indonesia, roughly one hour north of Makassar city. The Leang-Leang geopark lies in a limestone karst region densely packed with caves that contain paintings from the Paleolithic considered to be the earliest figurative art in the world, dated to at least 51,200 years ago.

Archaeological excavations have revealed evidence of human presence in several of these caves dating back approximately 50,000 years (circa 50,000 BCE), predating the first Austronesian migrations from Taiwan to the Philippines and the broader Indonesian archipelago, which began around 2000 BCE. Among the findings are prehistoric paintings, including red ochre negative hand stencils. In the Maros cave complex, some of these artworks have been dated to around 51,200 years ago. Similar techniques can be seen at prehistoric sites in Europe, such as the Pech Merle cave in the Lot region of France, dated to around 25,000 years ago.

== Caves ==
- Leang Karampuang: Holds the oldest known rock paintings of figures, dated to 51,200 years ago.
- Leang Tedongnge: Has paintings of pigs dating to at least 45,500 years ago.
- Bulu Sipong 4: Contains the oldest known hunting scene in the world, dated to 43,900 years ago.
- Gua Pettakere: Features hand stencils and depictions of what appear to be babirusas.
- Gua Pette
- Leang Jane
- Leang Saripa
- Leang Karrasa

The Indonesian government has designated the area as an archaeological park.

== History ==
The caves have been known and used by the local people for a long time. Dutch archaeologists began digging at nearby caves during the 1950s, but Pettakare cave was first examined by British archaeologist Ian Glover in 1973.

Scientific examinations conducted in 2011 estimated that the hand stencils and animal painting on the walls were between 35,000 and 40,000 years old. The age of the paintings was estimated through analysis of small radioactive traces of uranium isotopes present in the crust that had accumulated on top of the paintings. The hand paintings are at least as old as cave paintings in Europe, such as those at the Cave of El Castillo (Spain) and Gorham's Cave (Gibraltar).

In October 2014, the Indonesian government promised to "step up" the protection of ancient cave paintings, and announced plans to place all the caves in Sulawesi on the nation's official "cultural heritage" list, as well as apply for inclusion on UNESCO's list of World Heritage Sites.

== Description ==
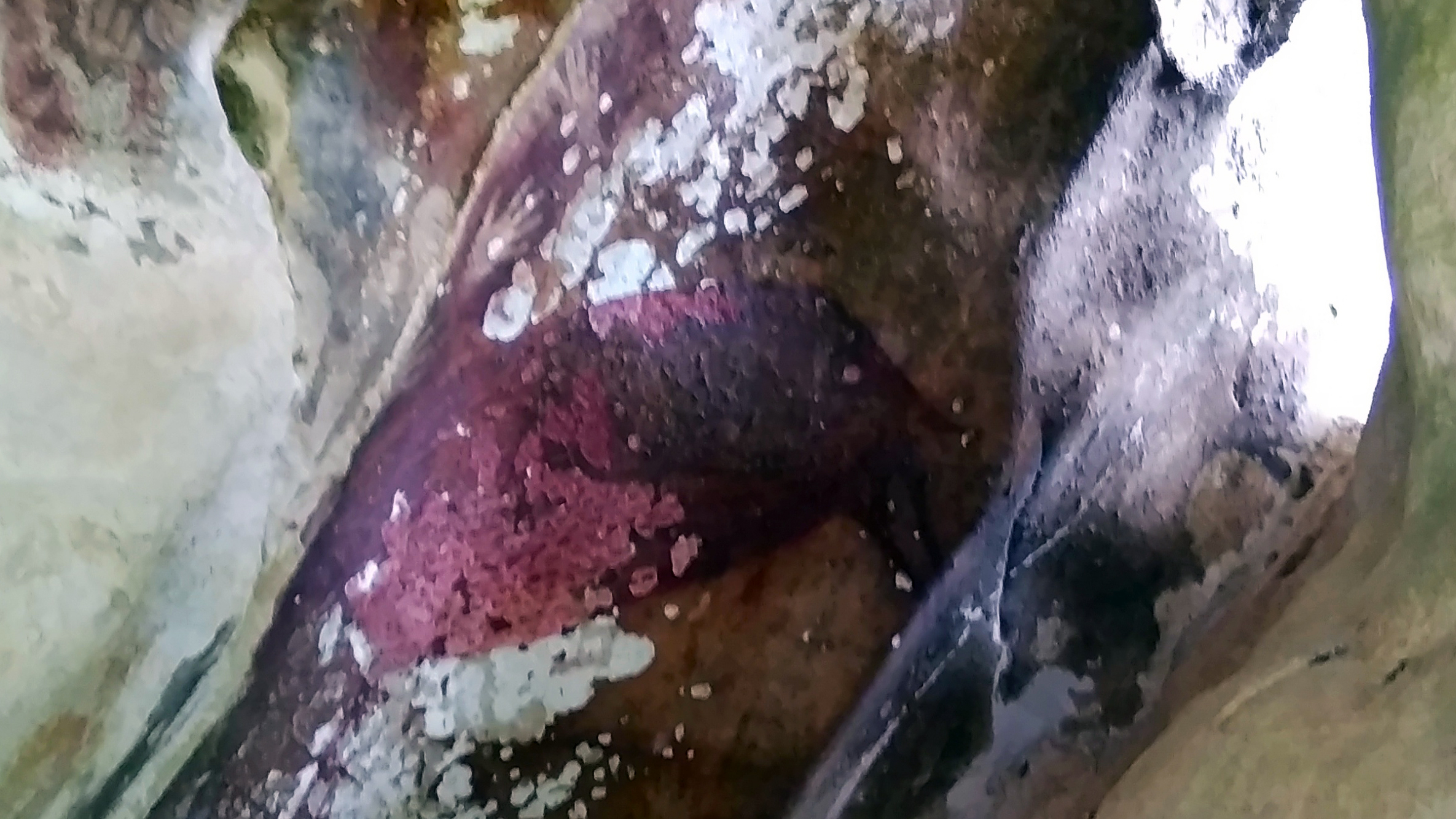
Pig-deer paint paintings

There are countless caves in the limestone Maros-Pangkep karst system, and many have been found to hold prehistoric finds. The whole complex is also called "Leang-Leang"; the name stems from the Makassarese language. The various caves — named Leang Pettae, Bulu Bettue, Burung, Saripa, Jarie, Karrasa, and more — have been formed in the limestone cliffs through water erosion. They are located roughly 12 kilometres (7.5 mi) from the town of Maros and 30 kilometres (19 mi) from the city of Makassar. The entrance to some the caves is located 30 metres (98 ft) above a rice field, accessible by ladder, while others are much higher or directly at the level of the rice fields.

A hand stencil in the Leang Tempuseng cave was dated to at least 39,900 years old in a 2014 study. The depiction of a babirusa is also located in this cave. It is estimated to be 35,400 years old. Two figurative paintings of warty pigs in Leang Tedongnge have been dated to at least 45,500 years old. A scene that appears to depict animal-headed humans hunting an anoa at Leang Bulu Sippong 4 has been dated to 50,200 years old, while a collection of human-like and animal figures at Leang Karampuang has been dated to 51,200 years ago. The paintings were dated using Uranium-Thorium dating of speleothems that have formed on top of and underneath the paintings.

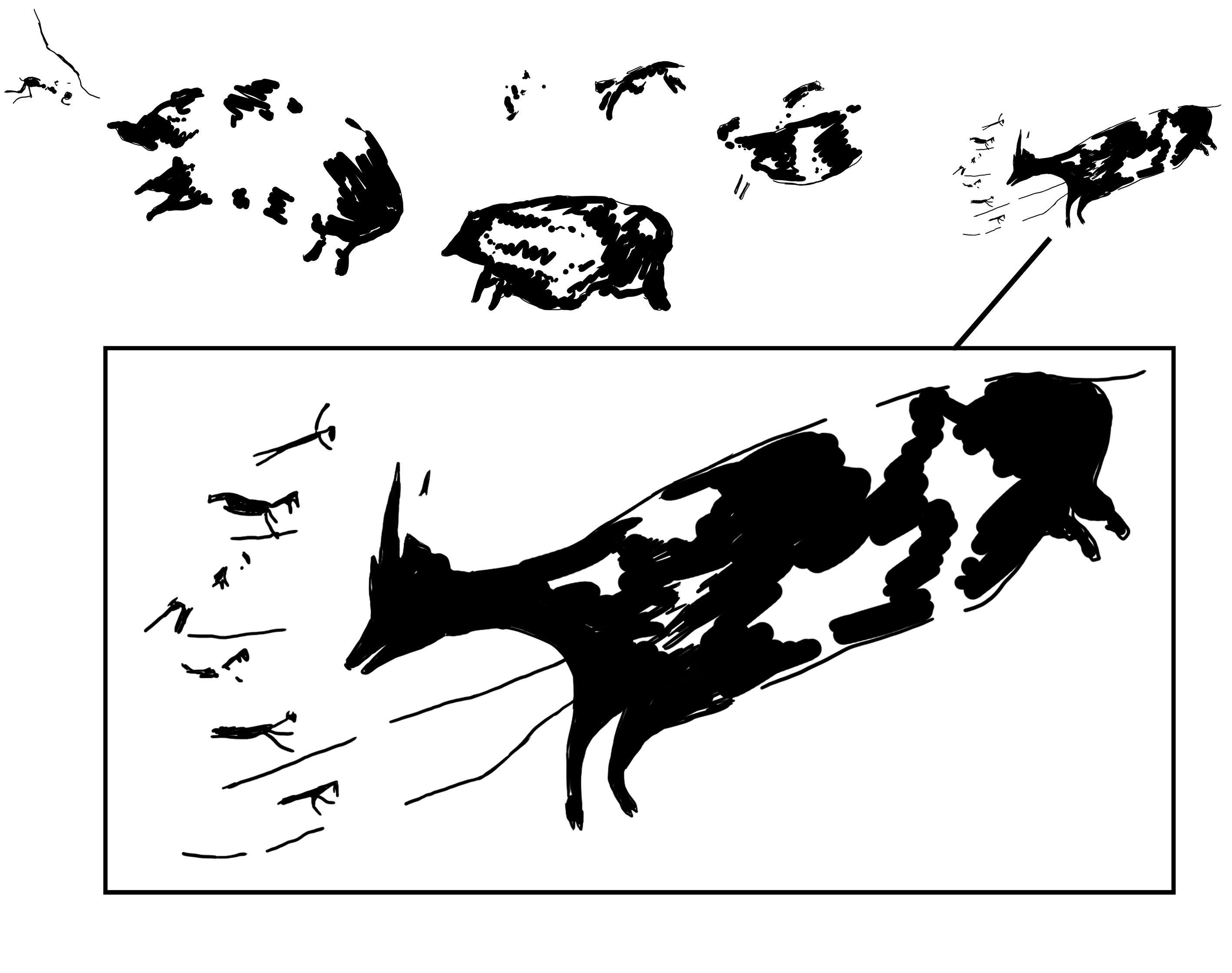
Redrawing of hunting scene from the Caves in the Maros-Pangkep karst

Inside the entrance of the Pettakare cave, on the roof, are 26 red and white hand prints, not yet dated as of 2014. These stencils of human hands were executed by "placing the hand up against the wall and then blowing a mixture of red ochre and water around them, leaving a negative image on the rock". The hand prints are of both left and right hands. Some are missing a thumb; historically it was common practice to cut off a finger when an elder died. According to an official with the Makassar Center for Cultural and Heritage Preservation, the palm of the hand was believed to have power to ward off "evil forces and wild animals", thus protecting the people who lived inside the cave. In addition to the hand prints, a roughly half-meter (two-foot) long painting of a red anoa is in the middle.

Pettakare cave's large room has several small niches. The cave has a temperature of 27 °C (81 °F) during the daytime.

On a rock wall in the cave of Leang Bulu’ Sipong 4 (in the Pangkep regency) representations of several animals and mixed animal-human beings (therianthropes) were found. A dark red pigment was used. In one scene several small humanoid figures (4 to 8 cm long) are connected with ropes or spears to a large anoa (74 by 29 cm). The paintings were examined by uranium series dating of the overlying speleothems. The paintings were initially dated to at least 43,900 years old with further work revising this to around 50,200 years. According to Aubert, it is the oldest hunting scene in prehistoric art. The wall paintings discovered by Pak Hamrullah in 2017 were dated and described in more detail by the research team around Maxime Aubert in 2019.

In 2021, an image of a roughly life-size Celebes warty pig (Sus celebensis, also called Sulawesi warty pig or Sulawesi pig) in Leang Tedongnge Cave was dated to be at least 45,500 years old, making it one of the oldest known figurative cave painting in the world. In 2025 a pig and human-like figures at Leang Karampuang was dated to 53,500 years old in research led by Indonesian researcher Dr Adhi Agus Oktaviana, making them the oldest known painted cave art in the world.

== See also ==
- History of painting
- Indonesian art
