= Prehistoric painting =

Prehistoric painting covers painting in Prehistoric art.

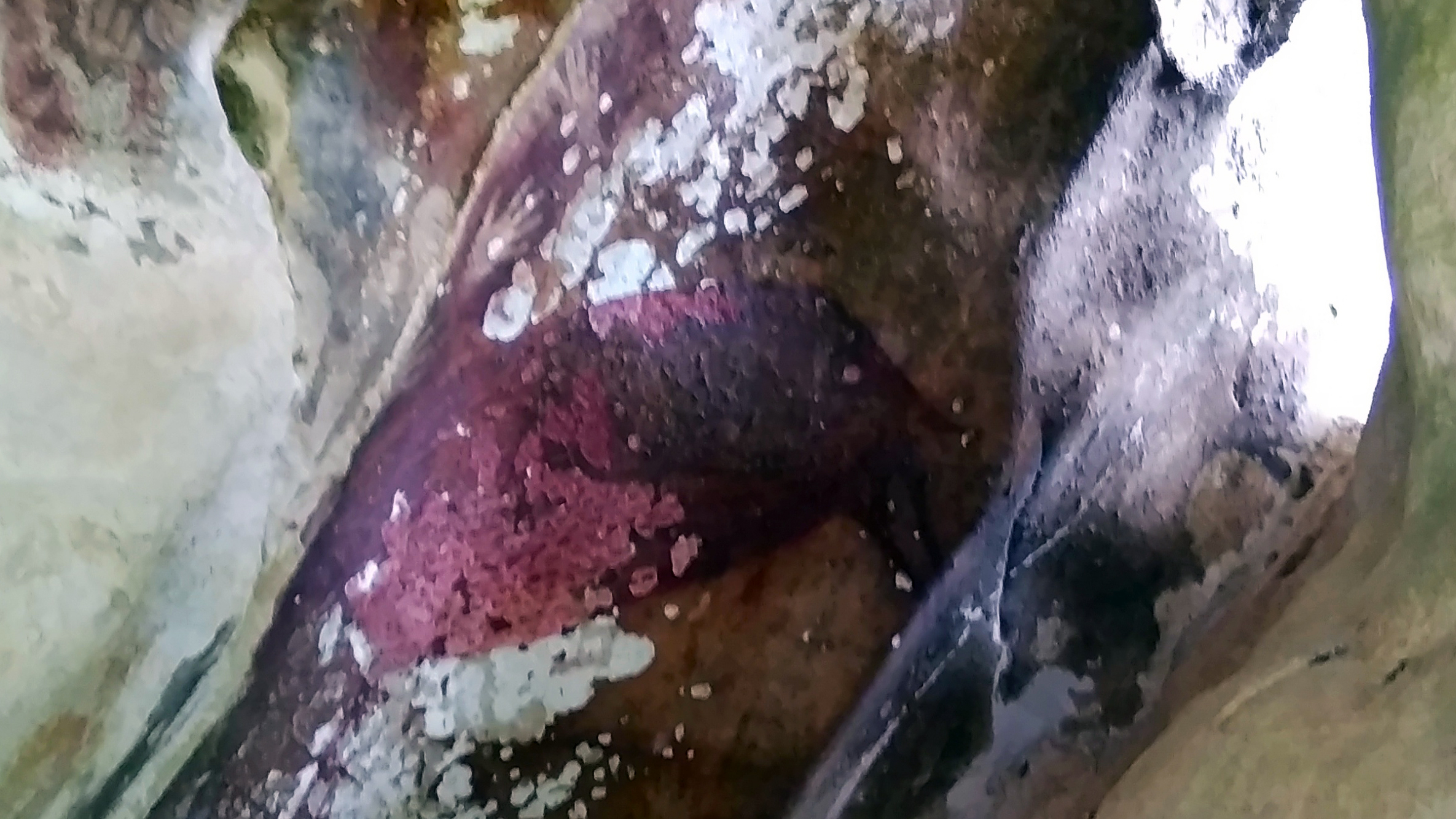
Cave paintings depicting a wild boar hunt in the Maros-Pangkep karst of Sulawesi are estimated to be at least 43,900 years old (2014). This finding was recognized as "the oldest known depiction of storytelling and the earliest instance of figurative art in human history."

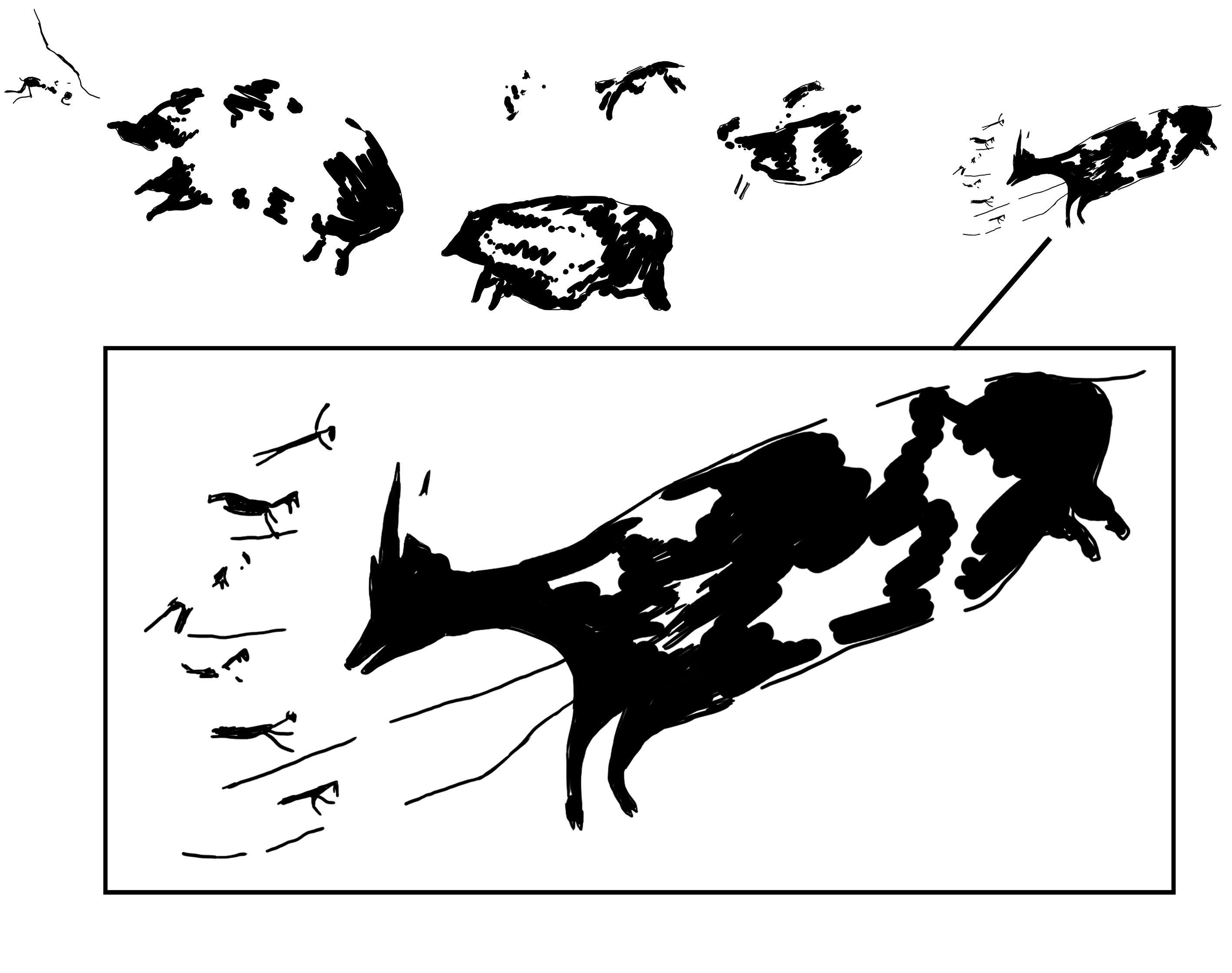
Redrawing of hunting scene from the Caves in the Maros-Pangkep karst

The oldest known paintings are more than 40,000-60,000 years old (art of the Upper Paleolithic) and found in the caves in the district of Maros (Sulawesi, Indonesia). They are constructed from hand stencils and simple geometric shapes. (Note: Some hand prints have been found in Tibet and dated to about 200,000 years-old.)

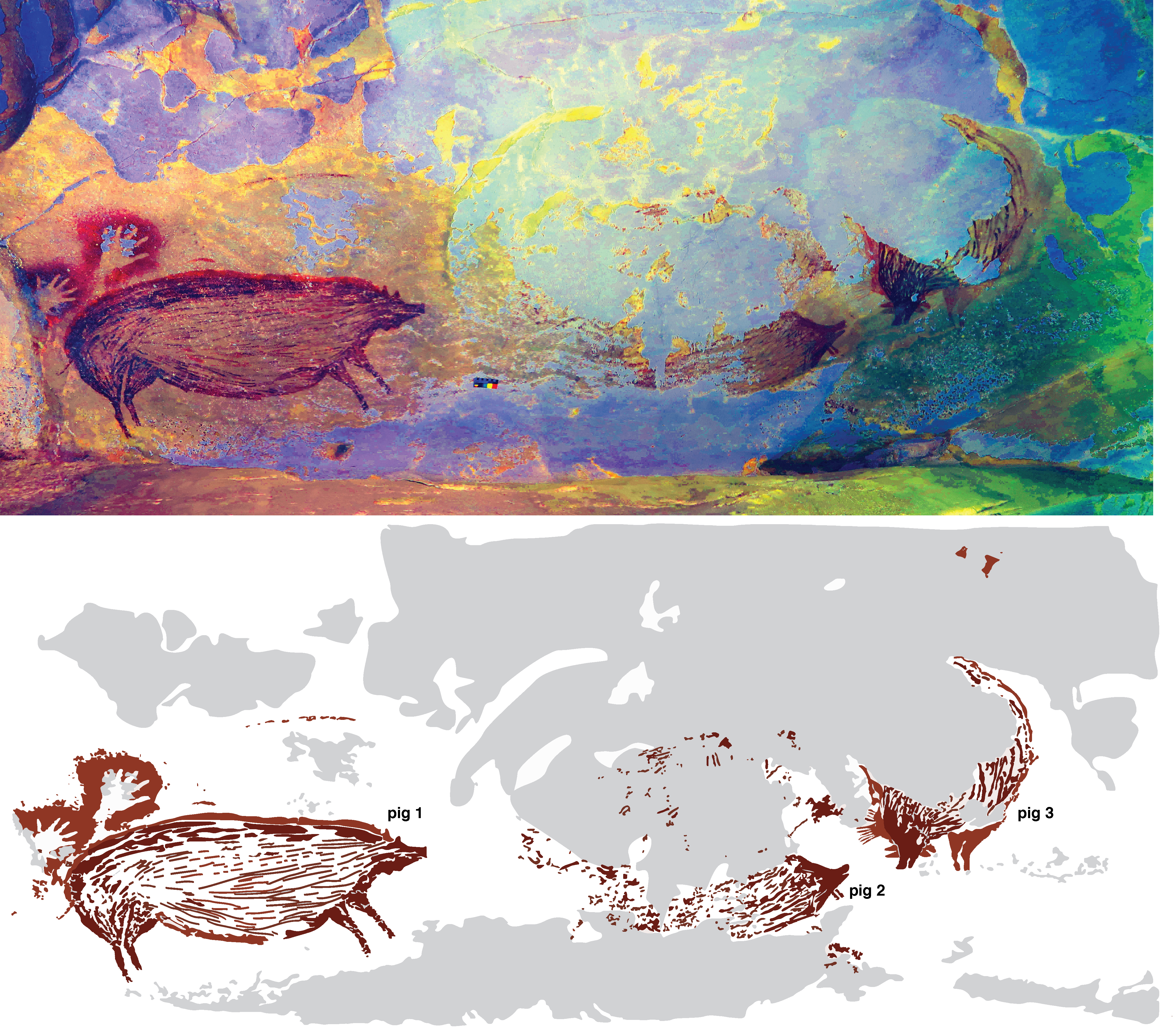
In 2021, researchers discovered ancient cave art in Leang Tedongnge, Sulawesi, Indonesia, estimated to be at least 45,500 years old. Depicting a warty pig, this artwork is recognized as the world's oldest known example of figurative or representational art.

In November 2018, scientists reported the discovery of the then-oldest known figurative art painting, over 40,000 (perhaps as old as 52,000) years old, of an unknown animal, in the cave of Lubang Jeriji Saléh in the Indonesian island of Borneo. In December 2019, cave paintings portraying pig hunting within the Maros-Pangkep karst region in Sulawesi were discovered to be even older, with an estimated age of at least 43,900 years. This finding was recognized as "the oldest known depiction of storytelling and the earliest instance of figurative art in human history." In 2021, cave art of a pig found in Sulawesi, Indonesia, and dated to over 45,500 years ago, has been reported. On July 3, 2024, the journal Nature published research findings indicating that the cave paintings which depict anthropomorphic figures interacting with a pig and measure 36 by 15 inches (91 by 38 cm) in Leang Karampuang are approximately 51,200 years old, establishing them as the oldest known paintings in the world.

There are examples of cave paintings all over the world—in Indonesia, France, India, Spain, Southern Africa, China, Australia etc.

Various conjectures have been made as to the meaning these paintings had to the people that made them. Prehistoric artists may have painted animals to "catch" their soul or spirit in order to hunt them more easily or the paintings may represent an animistic vision and homage to surrounding nature. They may be the result of a basic need of expression that is innate to human beings, or they could have been for the transmission of practical information.

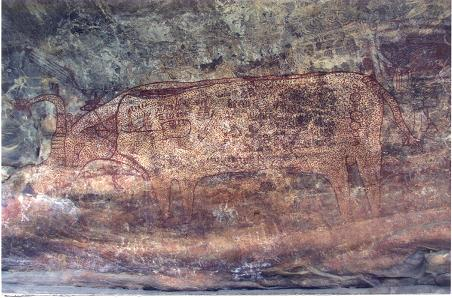
Rock Shelters of Bhimbetka, rock painting, Stone Age, India

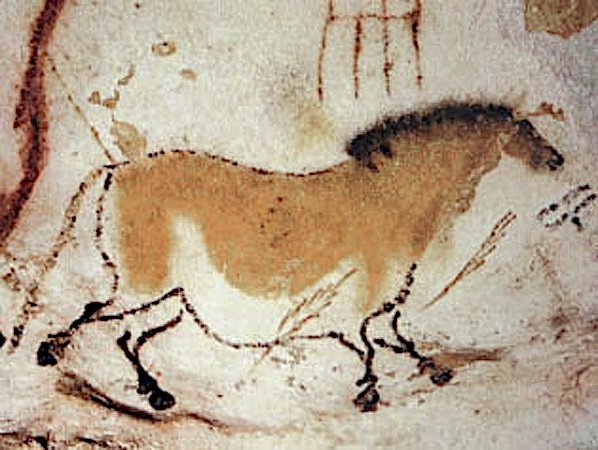
Lascaux, Horse

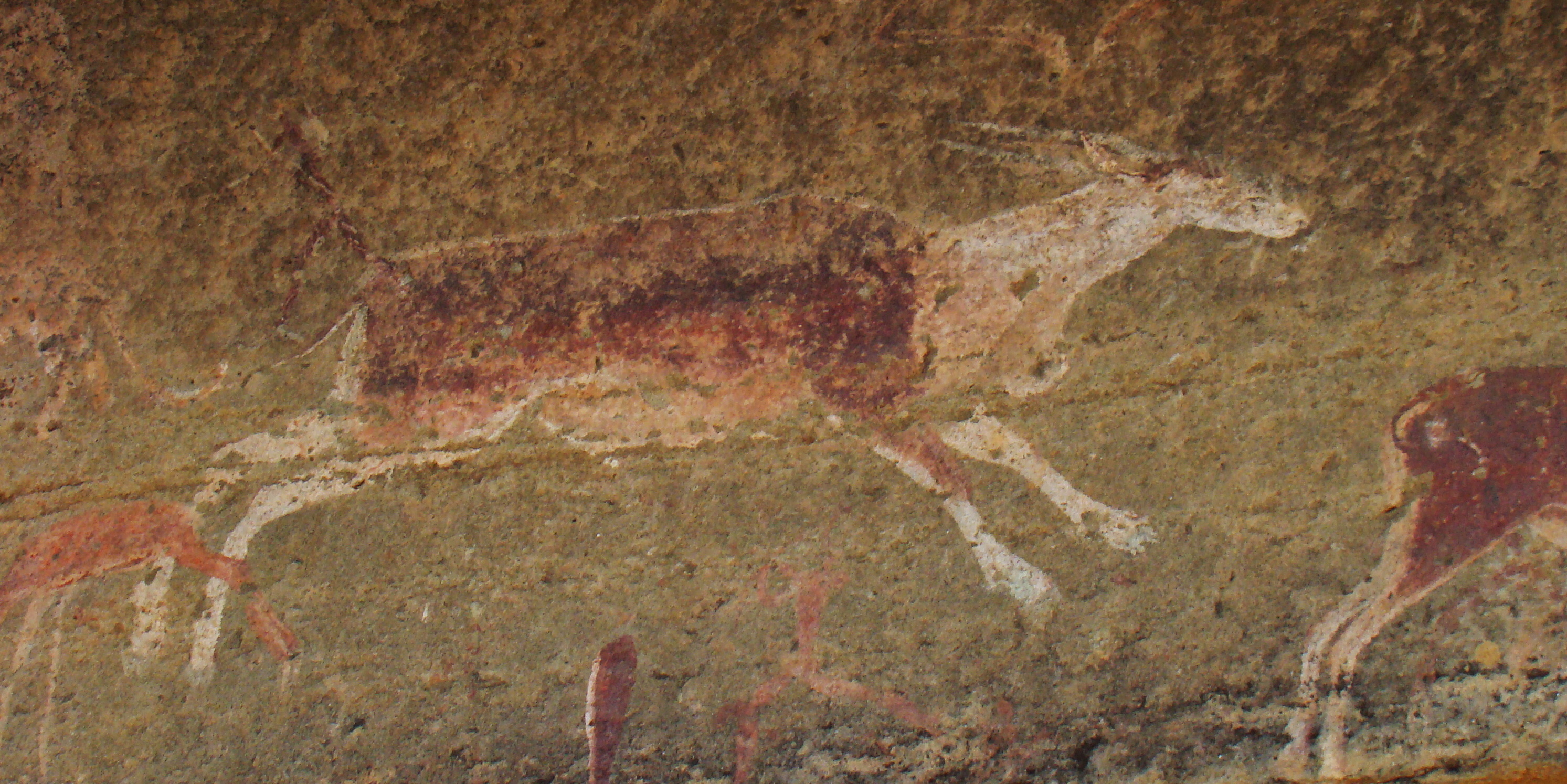
Eland, rock painting, Drakensberg, South Africa

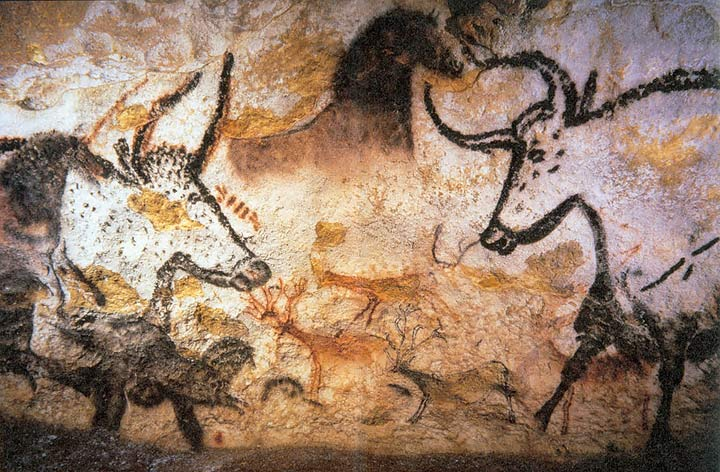
Lascaux, Bulls and Horses

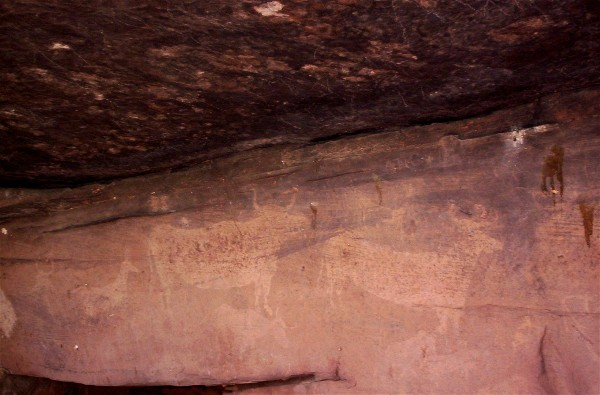
Spanish cave painting of Bulls

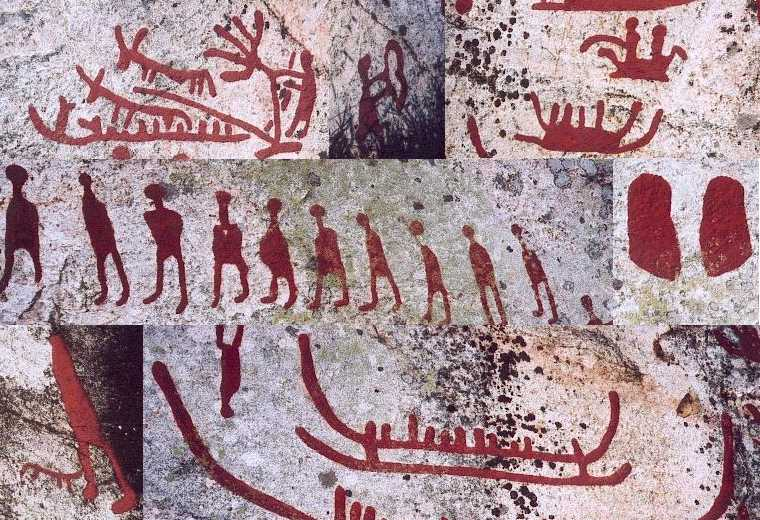
Petroglyphs, from Sweden, Nordic Bronze Age (painted)

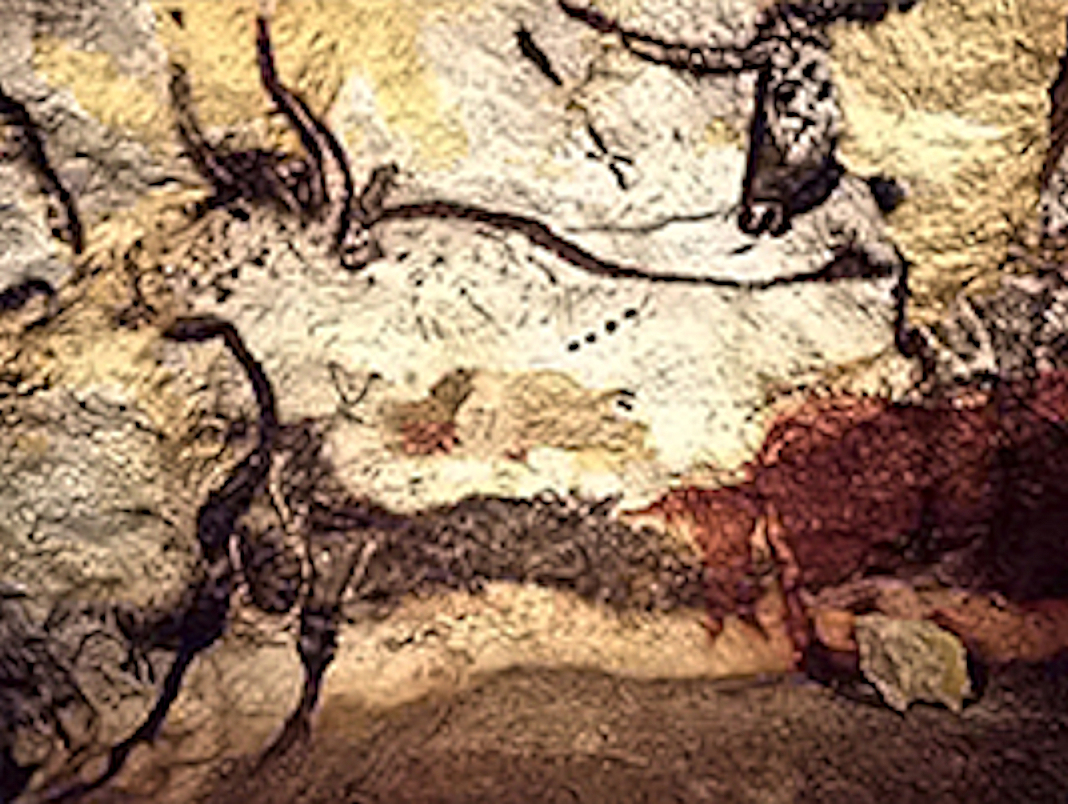
Lascaux, Aurochs (Bos primigenius primigenius)

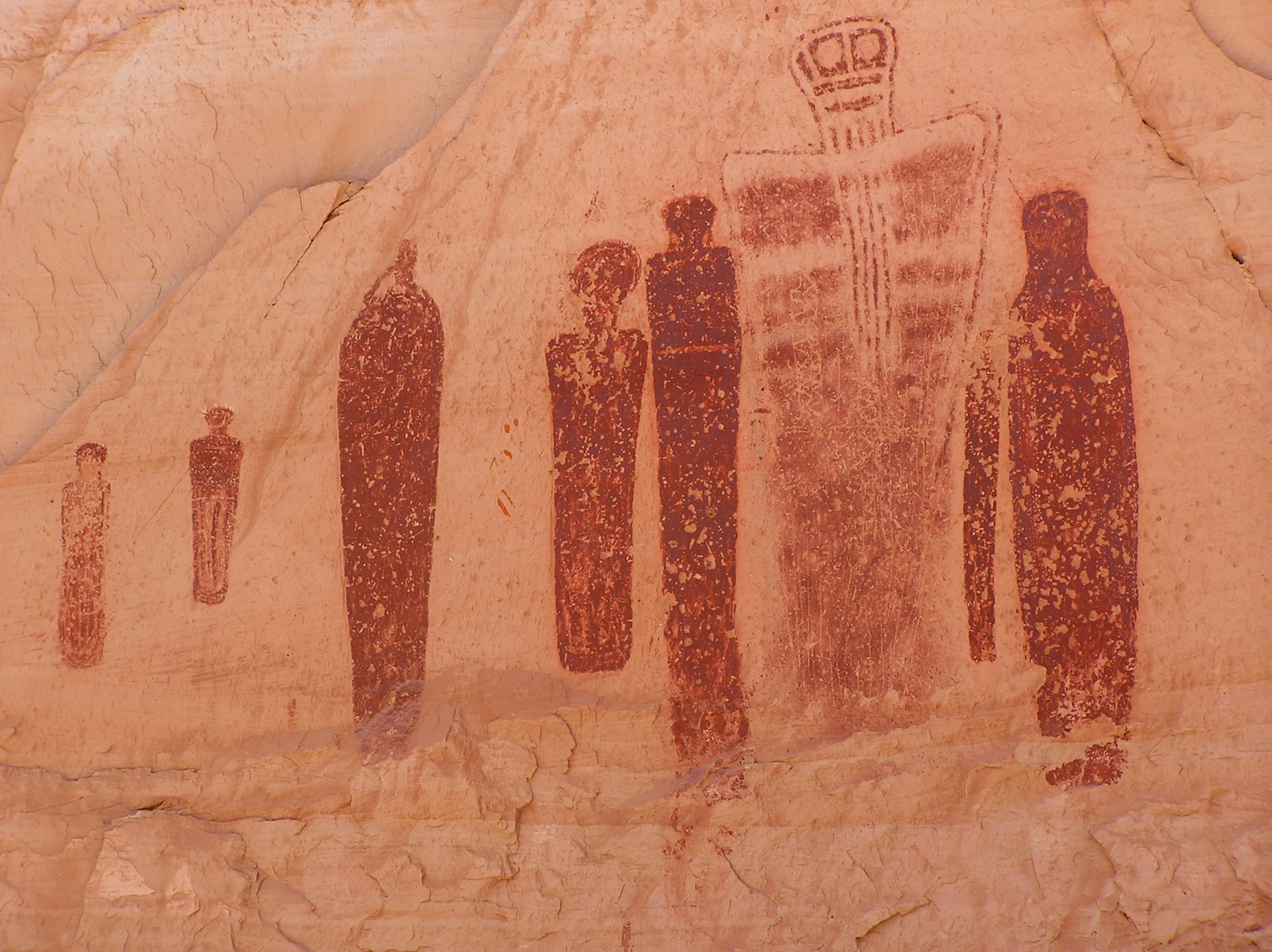
Pictographs from the Great Gallery, Canyonlands National Park, Horseshoe Canyon, Utah, c. 1500 BCE

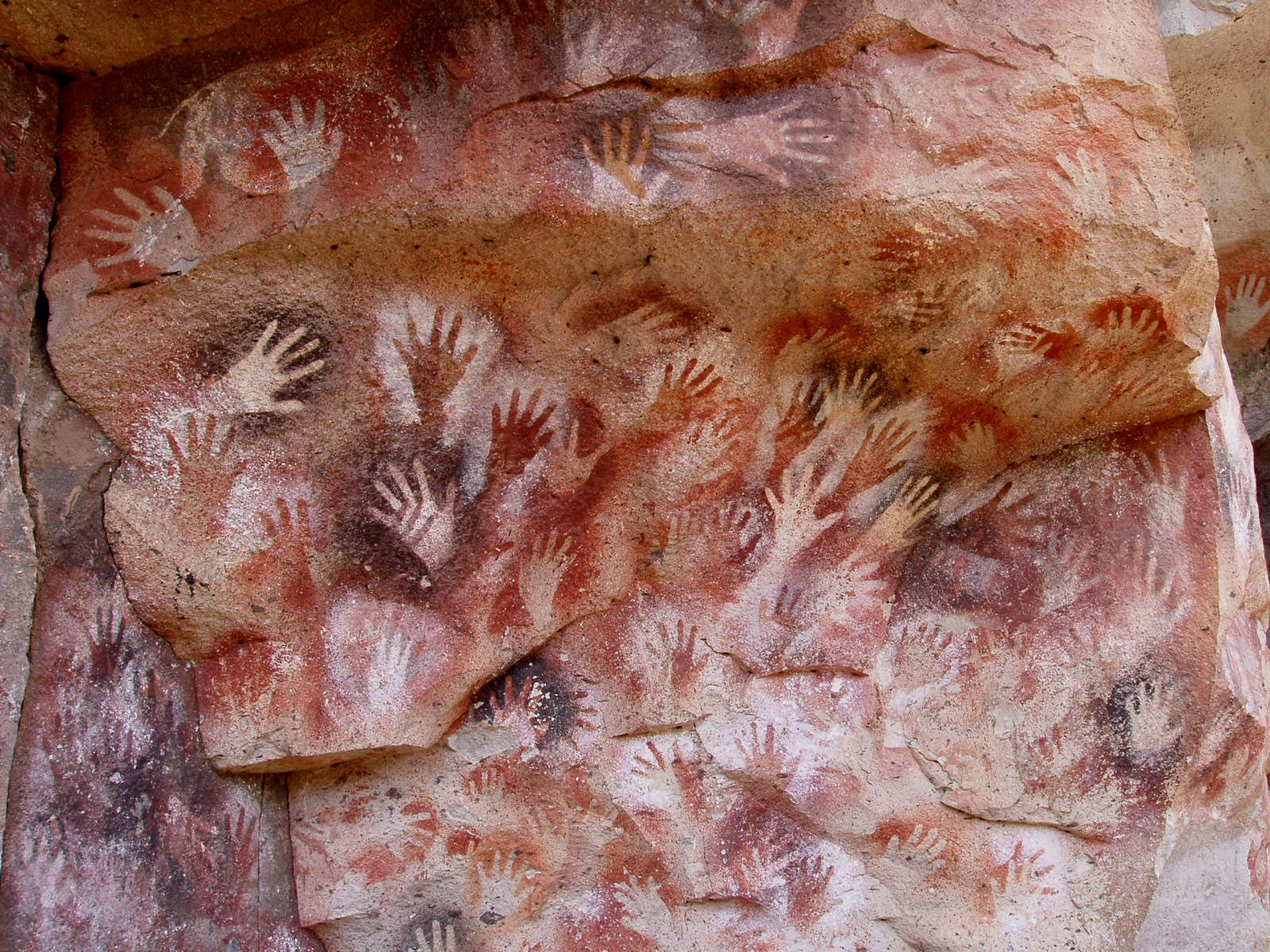
Cueva de las Manos (Spanish for Cave of the Hands) in the Santa Cruz province in Argentina, c. 7300 BC

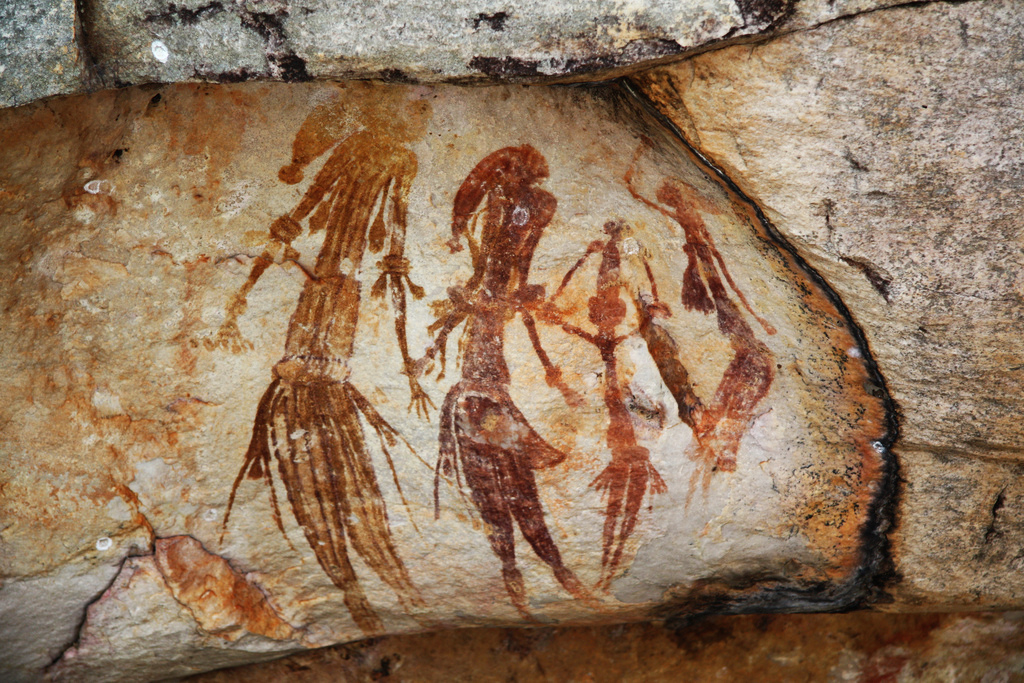
Gwion Gwion rock paintings found in the north-west Kimberley region of Western Australia c. 15,000 BC

In Paleolithic times, the representation of humans in cave paintings was rare. Mostly, animals were painted, not only animals that were used as food but also animals that represented strength like the rhinoceros or large Felidae, as in the Chauvet Cave. Signs like dots were sometimes drawn. Rare human representations include handprints and stencils, and figures depicting human–animal hybrids. The Chauvet Cave in the Ardèche Departments of France contains the most important preserved cave paintings of the Paleolithic era, painted around 31,000 BC. The Altamira cave paintings in Spain were done 14,000 to 12,000 BC and show, among others, bisons. The hall of bulls in Lascaux, Dordogne, France, is one of the best known cave paintings and dates to about 15,000 to 10,000 BC.

If there is meaning to the paintings, it remains unknown. The caves were not in an inhabited area, so they may have been used for seasonal rituals. The animals are accompanied by signs which suggest a possible magic use. Arrow-like symbols in Lascaux are sometimes interpreted as being used as calendars or almanacs, but the evidence remains inconclusive. The most important work of the Mesolithic era were the marching warriors, a rock painting at Cingle de la Mola, Castellón, Spain dated to about 7000 to 4000 BC. The technique used was probably spitting or blowing the pigments onto the rock. The paintings are quite naturalistic, though stylized. The figures are not three-dimensional, even though they overlap.

The earliest known Indian paintings were the rock paintings of prehistoric times, the petroglyphs as found in places like the Rock Shelters of Bhimbetka, and some of them are older than 5500 BC. Such works continued and after several millennia, in the 7th century, carved pillars of Ajanta, Maharashtra state present a fine example of Indian paintings. The colors, mostly various shades of red and orange, were derived from minerals.
