= Bubalus fudi =

Bubalus fudi Temporal range: Late Pleistocene

Scientific classification
- Kingdom: Animalia
- Phylum: Chordata
- Class: Mammalia
- Infraclass: Placentalia
- Order: Artiodactyla
- Family: Bovidae
- Subfamily: Bovinae
- Genus: Bubalus
- Species: †B. fudi

Binomial name
- †Bubalus fudi Guo, 2008

Extinct species of mammal

Bubalus fudi is an extinct relative of water buffalo, which survived in the late Pleistocene.

== Discovery ==
The fossil of Bubalus fudi was discovered by a company (Beijing Fudi Investment Co., Ltd) in 2002 while digging the foundations of a building near Haidian District Qinghe railway station. It was a complete skull fossil and published by researchers in 2008 as a new species. Researchers use the company's name (Fudi) as the specific epithet of the species. The holotype was collected by the company. Researchers think that the appearance of species is close to Bubalus youngi. The horns are both strong and there are no obvious back bump on the skull occipital bone, but the occipital bone position is higher than Bubalus youngi. The results of the analysis of phylogenetics based on skull characteristics showed that Bubalus fudi was a sister group of Bubalus youngi, Bubalus triangulus and the clade of the living bubalus, while the clade of the four was the sister group of Bubalus wansjocki.

In 2014, some scholars proposed that Bubalus fudi should be regarded as a subspecies of Bubalus wansjocki.

== See also ==
Below are other water buffalo fossils unearthed in China:

- B. teilhardi
- B. youngi
- B. wansijocki
- B. tingi
- B. guzhenensis
- B. mephistophele
- B. brevicornis
- B. triangulus
