= Bubalus grovesi =

Bubalus grovesi Temporal range: Late Pleistocene - Holocene

Scientific classification
- Kingdom: Animalia
- Phylum: Chordata
- Class: Mammalia
- Order: Artiodactyla
- Family: Bovidae
- Subfamily: Bovinae
- Genus: Bubalus
- Subgenus: Anoa
- Species: †B. grovesi

Binomial name
- †Bubalus grovesi Rozzi, 2017

Extinct species of bovid

Bubalus grovesi is an extinct species of bovine that once lived in southern Sulawesi during the Late Pleistocene and Early Holocene epochs.

B. grovesi was an extremely small buffalo species, estimated at only 117 kg (258 lb). It experienced a body size reduction of about 90% from the typical water buffalo. The closest relatives of B. grovesi are the two living species of anoa, which still inhabit Sulawesi today.
