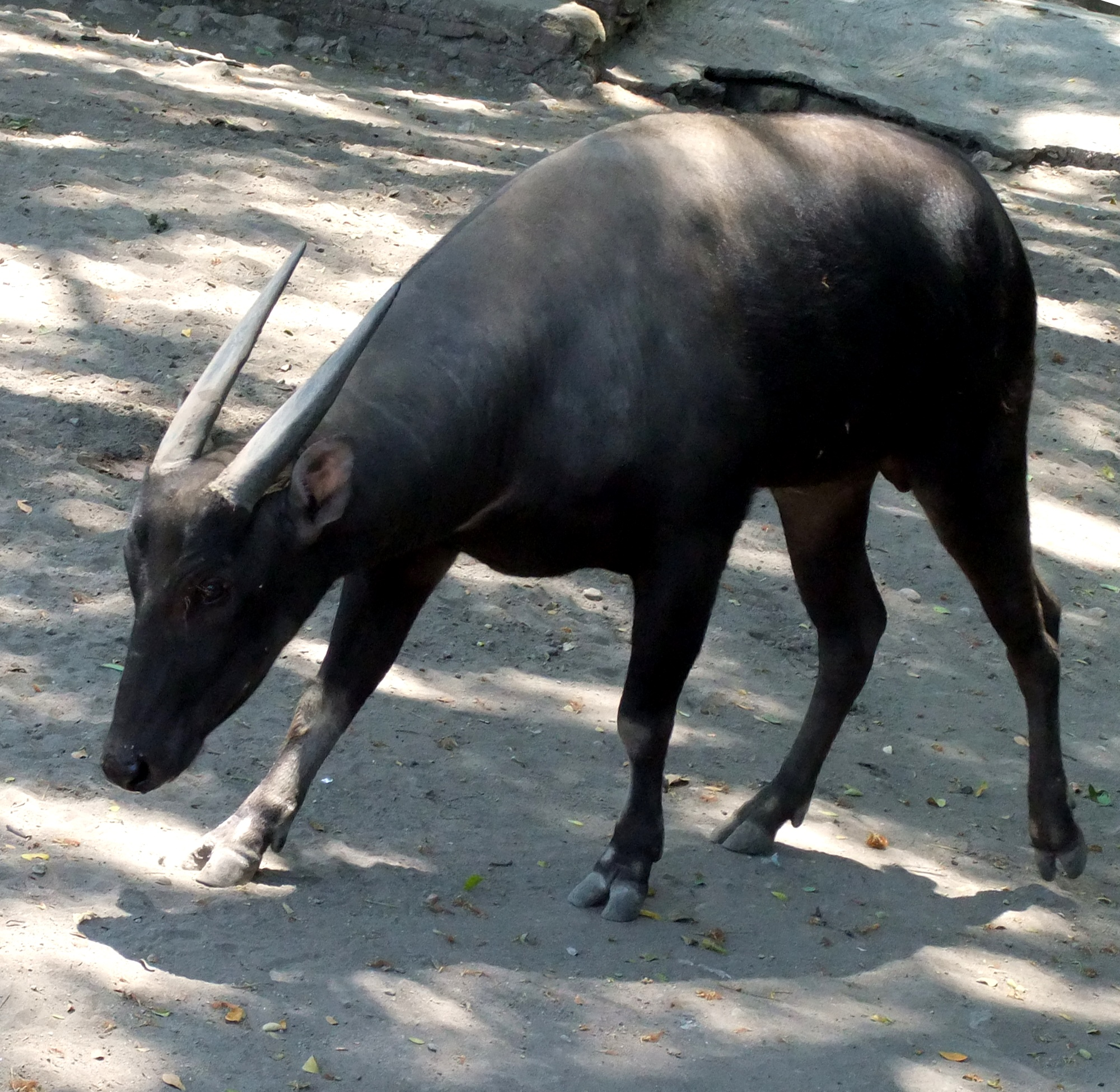
- Lowland anoa (B. depressicornis) at the Surabaya Zoo, Surabaya, East Java, Indonesia
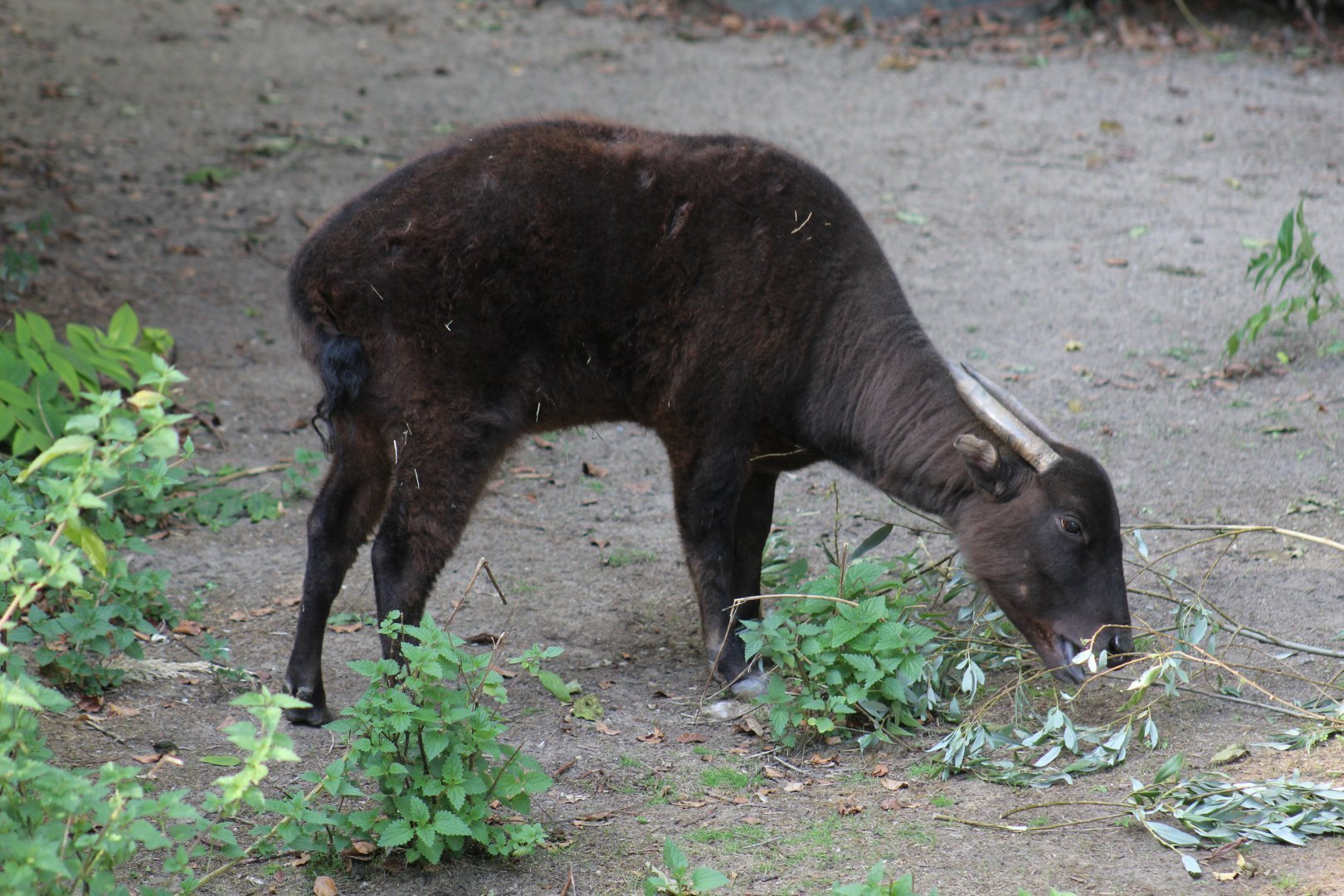
- Mountain anoa (B. quarlesi) at the Krefeld Zoo, Krefeld, Germany

Scientific classification
- Kingdom: Animalia
- Phylum: Chordata
- Class: Mammalia
- Order: Artiodactyla
- Family: Bovidae
- Subfamily: Bovinae
- Genus: Bubalus
- Subgenus: Anoa

Species
- Bubalus depressicornis Smith, 1827 (type); †Bubalus grovesi Rozzi, 2017; Bubalus quarlesi Ouwens, 1910

= Anoa =

Dwarf buffalo from Sulawesi

Anoa, also known as dwarf buffalo and sapiutan, are two living species of the genus Bubalus, placed within the subgenus Anoa and endemic to the island of Sulawesi in Indonesia: the mountain anoa, Bubalus quarlesi, and the lowland anoa, Bubalus depressicornis. Both live in undisturbed rainforests and are similar in appearance to miniature water buffaloes, weighing up to 150kg (quarlesi) and 300kg (depressicornis). Images of anoas may be present in the oldest rock art known as of 2024, from more than 51,000 years ago. The name "Anoa", itself, is Celebic in origin, cognate to words in related Philippine languages in the same Austronesian family that name the common water buffalo (anwáng in Tagalog, nuáng in Ilocano, nuwang in Ifugaw etc.).

== Endangered status ==
Both described species of anoa have been classified as endangered since the 1960s, and as of this date, the populations continue to decrease, with likely fewer than 5,000 animals of each species remaining. Reasons for their decline over this period include poaching for hides, horns, and meat by the local peoples, and loss of habitat due to the advancement of settlement. Currently, poaching is the most serious factor in most areas.

== Morphology ==
The anoa have many physical characteristics of bovine relatives and are considered to be most closely related to the water buffalo, which was confirmed through DNA analysis. The physical characteristics of the two species are described as being similar. They are the smallest of the wild cattle species. They are stocky, short limbed and thick necked. When anoa are born, they have a set of thick, woolly fur that comes in many color variations ranging from yellow to brown. In adults, the fur is typically dark brown and wooly (quarlesi) or black and sparse (depressicornis) and males tend to have darker variations. In both species, horns are present in both males and females, and are typically straight protuberances. Another defining characteristic of the anoa is an extremely thick hide underneath the thick fur.

Species identification can difficult due to overlap in morphological characteristics. It is suggested that horn cross-sections, fur, and leg markings can be used for provisional identification. Notably, the lowland anoa always has white markings on its forelimbs under the knee.

== Behavior and life expectancy ==
The 1911 Encyclopedia Britannica source states, with regard to behavior, that B. depressicornis "in habits... appears to resemble the Indian buffalo". Other sources state, with regard to both species, that they live singly or in pairs, rather than in herds like most cattle, except when the cows are about to give birth, that they take two to three years before they reach sexual maturity. Anoa are described as having one calf a year, and have very rarely been seen to have more.

In captive individuals, anoa have a life expectancy of 20–30 years.

== Distribution and habitat ==
Both the lowland anoa (Bubalus depressicornis) and the mountain anoa (Bubalus quarlesi) are endemic to the islands of Sulawesi, on the island of Sulawesi and the nearby island of Buton in Indonesia. Both species appear to occupy the same areas. Sulawesi is a unique area because roughly 61% of the species found there are endemic species, including both anoa species.

Traditionally, a key difference between the two species is the altitude at which they occur. The mountain anoa can be found at higher elevations than its lowland counterpart and is found in the forests. The lowland anoa was said to spend its time in the lower elevation areas and is also found in forests. Since 2005, however, these differences do not seem to be accurate, both species occur in the same areas in the same habitats.

== Species ==
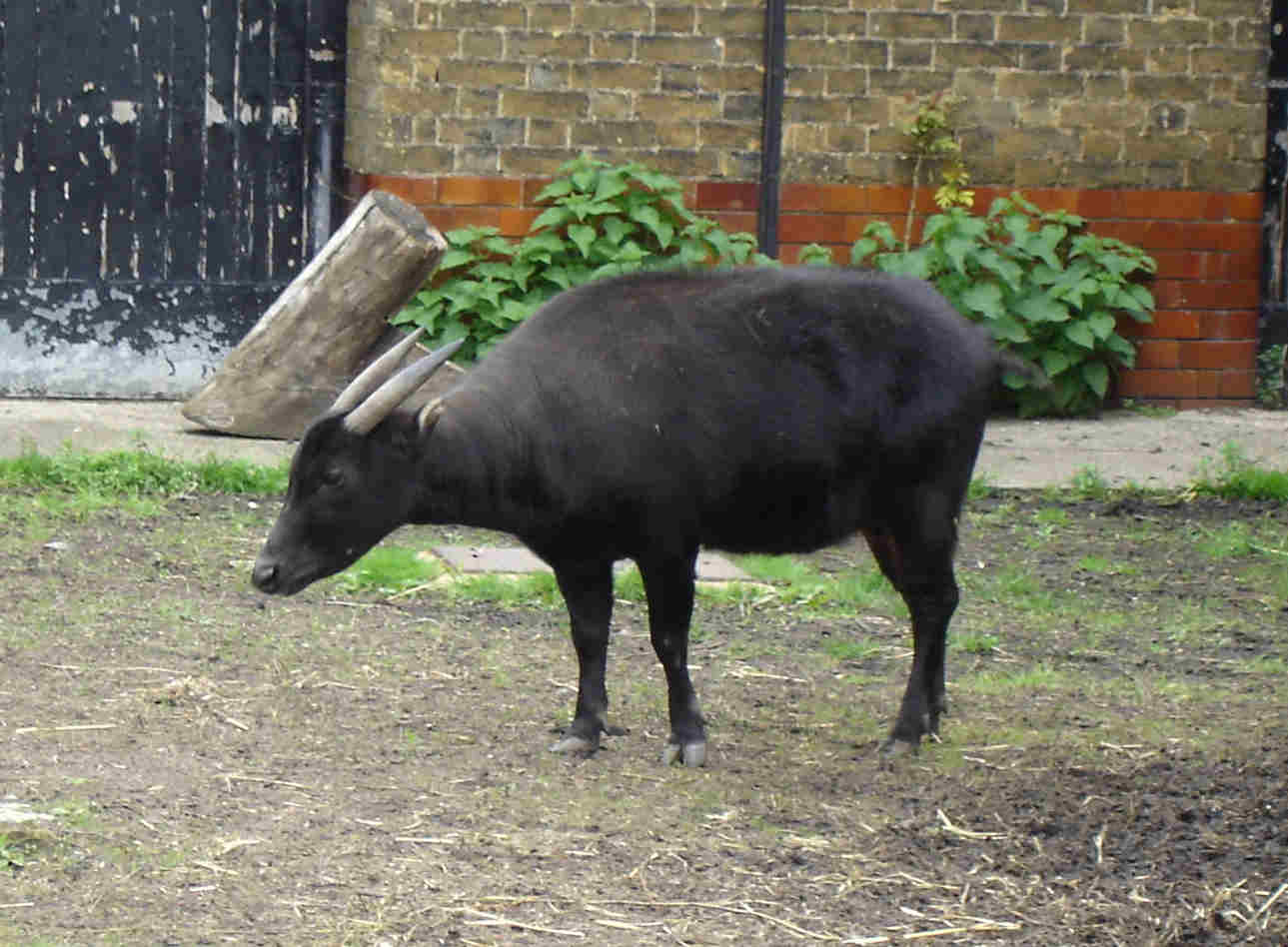
Lowland anoa

There has been uncertainty regarding the two species hypothesis due to the original taxonomic distinction being made due to habitat variation and subtle morphological differences. However, studies of the mtDNA of zoological specimens from different localities found a high mitochondrial genetic diversity between individuals identified as one or the other species, indicating support for recognition as two species.

- The lowland anoa (Bubalus depressicornis) is a small bovid, standing barely over 90 cm (35 in) at the shoulder. It is usually solitary, living in lowland forests, browsing on plants and understory. According to Groves (1969) the lowland anoa can be told apart from the other species by being larger, having a triangular horn cross-section, sparse as opposed to thick and woolly hair, and always having white markings on the face and legs.

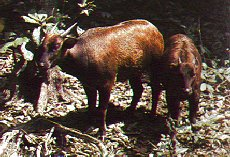
Mountain anoa

- The mountain anoa (Bubalus quarlesi) is also known as Quarle's anoa and anoa pegunungan. Standing at 70 cm (28 in) at the shoulder, it is even smaller than the lowland anoa and the smallest of all living wild cattle. They also have longer, woolier hair that moults every year, showing faint spots on the head, neck, and limbs. According to Groves (1969), the mountain anoa can be told apart from the other species by being smaller, having a round horn cross-section, thick and woolly hair, and sometimes having white markings on the face and legs.

== Conservation ==
Both anoa species are endemic to the island of Sulawesi and are currently experiencing large declines in their populations. Knowledge of their decline has only recently been documented, however, and the villages and villagers lack the knowledge of how to help maintain or increase populations.

The leading cause of their population decline is hunting by local villagers for meat, with habitat loss also being significant. One benefit of the lack of knowledge about the legal status of what they are doing is that villagers are open to communication with researchers on their harvests and hunting practices; where awareness of conservation issues has penetrated, villagers will lie about their activities.

Logging is a large issue because both species prefer core forested habitats that are far away from humans and the influences that come with them. By logging, humans create much more fragmented habitats and, therefore, a decrease in the area where the anoa can breed and live. This habitat fragmentation also alters the natural mixing of populations of the anoa. This may lead to a loss in genetic diversity between the two species and, over time, could also lead to their decline.
