= Equus semiplicatus =

Equus semiplicatus Temporal range: 2.588–0.009 Ma

Scientific classification
- Kingdom: Animalia
- Phylum: Chordata
- Class: Mammalia
- Order: Perissodactyla
- Family: Equidae
- Genus: Equus
- Subgenus: incertae sedis
- Species: †E. semiplicatus

Binomial name
- †Equus semiplicatus Cope, 1893

Synonyms
- Onager semiplicatus (Cope, 1893)

Extinct species of mammal

Equus semiplicatus was a Pleistocene species of New World stilt-legged horse, and considered the type species for the stilt legged horses, one of three lineages of equids within the Americas, the other two being hippidionid and caballine horses. Now extinct, Equus semiplicatus once inhabited North America.

Fossils found William's Cave in Texas have been identified as Equus semiplicatus.

== See also ==
- Evolution of the horse
