= Equus major =

Equus major Temporal range: Early Pleistocene (Gelasian) 2.6–1.8 Ma

Scientific classification
- Kingdom: Animalia
- Phylum: Chordata
- Class: Mammalia
- Order: Perissodactyla
- Family: Equidae
- Genus: Equus
- Species: †E. major

Binomial name
- †Equus major Delafond and Depéret, 1893

Synonyms
- Equus robustus Pomel, 1853

Extinct species of large equine native to Europe during the Early Pleistocene

Equus major is an extinct species of large equine native to Europe during the Early Pleistocene epoch.

== Taxonomy ==
The species was first recognised as Equus stenonis race major in 1893 by Delafond and Depéret, 1893 based on remains found near Chagny, France. In 1954, Equus bressanus was proposed as a replacement name, but later authors have judged that the 1893 naming has priority, with the correct name being E. major. It is considered to be a "stenonine" equine with a close relationship to other Early Pleistocene European equines, with a close relationship in particular being suggested with the later Equus suessenbornensis.

== Description ==
Equus major was a very large equine, with an estimated body mass ranging from 500 kilograms (1,100 lb) to over 800 kilograms (1,800 lb) in the largest individuals. The limb bones are massive. There are a number of distinctive dental characters.

== Distribution and chronology ==
Equus major is known from fossils across Europe, spanning from France, Britain, and the Netherlands in the west, eastwards to Romania and southern Russia. These remains span from the Pliocene-Pleistocene boundary, around 2.6-2.5 million years ago, to around 1.8 million years ago, to the end of the Gelasian stage of the Early Pleistocene. Remains from Spain previously attributed to E. cf major are now attributed to Equus livenzovensis.

== Ecology ==
Unlike living equines, Equus major is thought to have had a diet ranging from that of a browser to a mixed feeder based on dental wear analysis. It is suggested to have been associated with forested, humid environments. It is found at some localities with the somewhat smaller fellow "stenonine" Equus stenonis.
