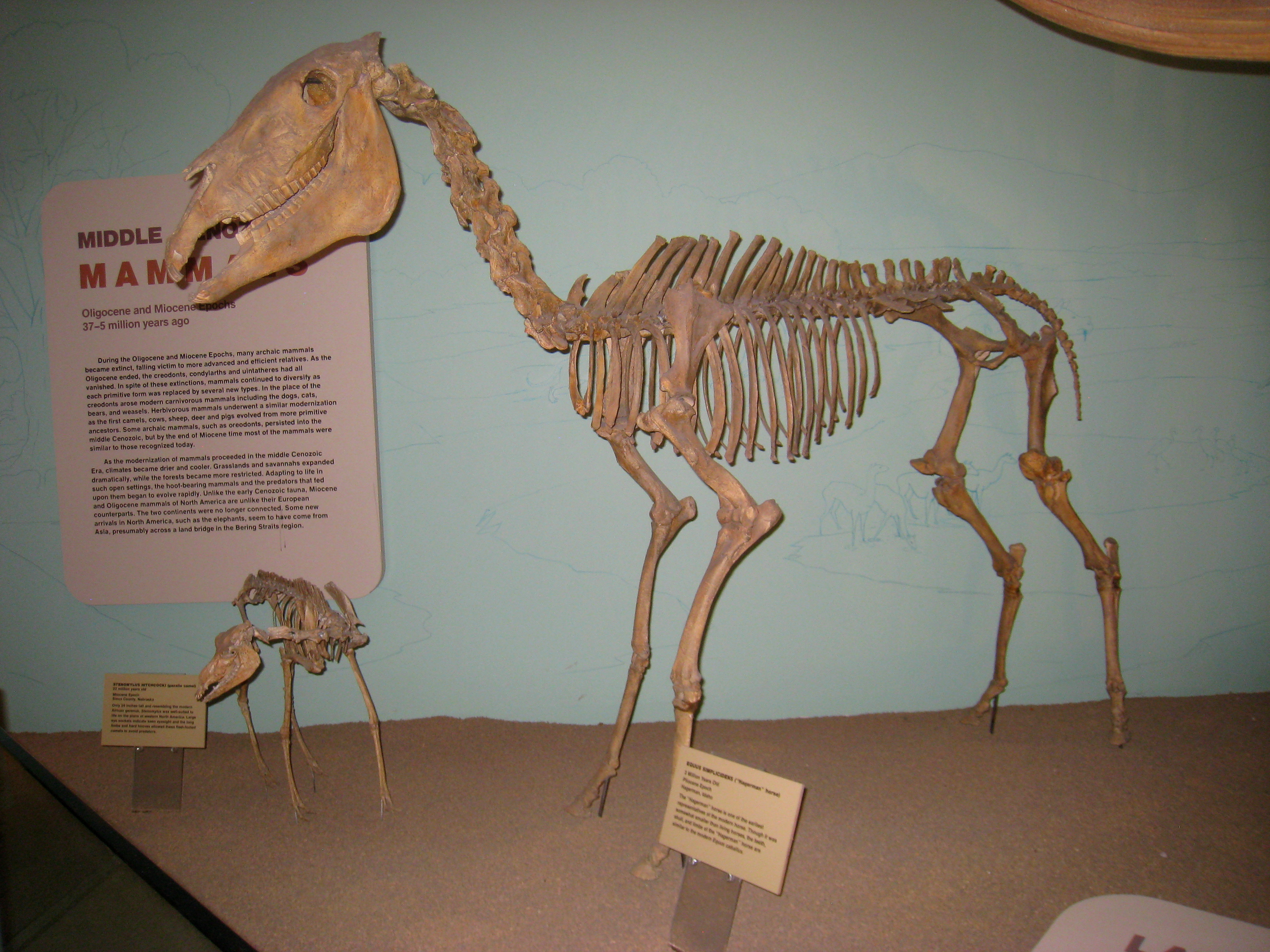
- Mounted skeleton of a Hagerman horse

Scientific classification
- Kingdom: Animalia
- Phylum: Chordata
- Class: Mammalia
- Infraclass: Placentalia
- Order: Perissodactyla
- Family: Equidae
- Genus: Equus
- Species: †E. simplicidens

Binomial name
- †Equus simplicidens Cope, 1892

Synonyms
- Plesippus shoshonensis Gidley, 1930

= Hagerman horse =

Hagerman horse Temporal range: Pliocene–Early Pleistocene

Extinct species of mammal

Equus simplicidens, also known as the Hagerman horse and American zebra, is an extinct species of equine native to North America during the Pliocene and Early Pleistocene. It is one of the oldest and most primitive members of the genus Equus. It is the state fossil of Idaho, where abundant remains of the species were discovered near the town of Hagerman in 1928.

== Discovery ==
A cattle rancher named Elmer Cook discovered some fossil bones on his land in Hagerman, Idaho. In 1928, he showed them to Dr. H. T. Stearns of the U.S. Geological Survey who then passed them on to Dr. James W. Gidley at the Smithsonian Institution. Identified as bones belonging to an extinct horse, the area where the fossils were discovered, called the Hagerman Horse Quarry, was excavated and three tons of specimens were sent back to the Smithsonian in Washington, D.C.

Excavation of the fossils continued into the early 1930s. The Hagerman Horse Quarry floor grew to 5,000 square feet (460 m^{2}) with a backwall 45 feet (14 m) high. Ultimately five nearly complete skeletons, more than 100 skulls, and forty-eight lower jaws as well as numerous isolated bones were found. Gidley believed that such a large amount of fossils found in one location was because of the quarry area being a watering hole at one point. The waterhole could have been where the bones of the Hagerman horses accumulated as injured, old, and ill animals, drawn to water, died there. A study by H. Gregory McDonald in 1996 alternatively suggested based on the age distribution of remains at the quarry, which span from newborns to adults, that a herd died in a single catastrophic event, perhaps attempting to cross a swelled/flooded river.

== Classification ==
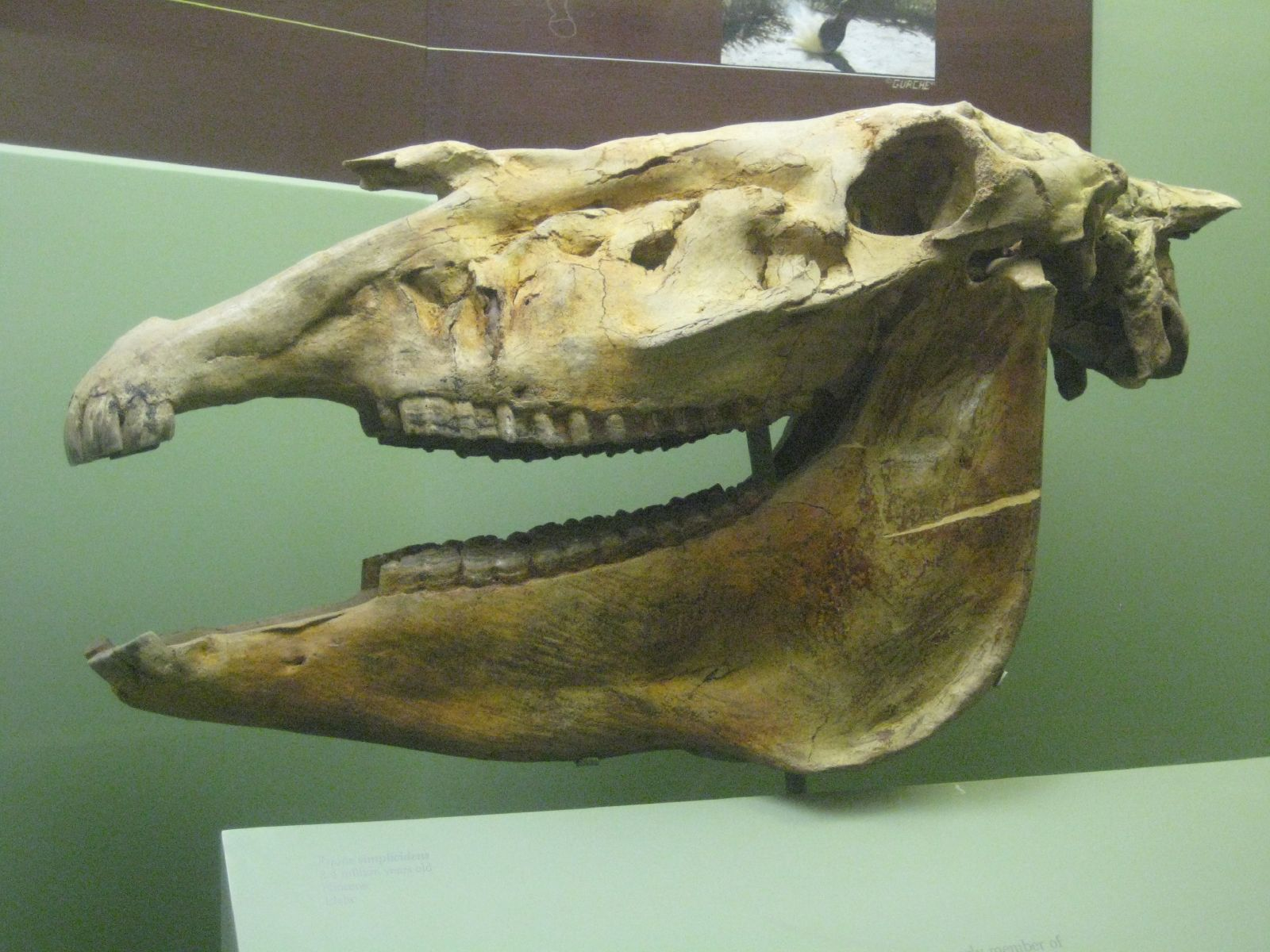
Equus simplicidens skull

The Hagerman horse was given the scientific name of Plesippus shoshonensis in 1930 by a Smithsonian paleontologist named James W. Gidley who led the initial excavations at Hagerman that same year.

However further study by other paleontologists determined that fossils closely resembled fossils of a primitive horse from Texas named Equus simplicidens, named by paleontologist Edward Drinker Cope in 1892. Because of this similarity, the two forms were interpreted to be the same species, and since the name Equus simplicidens was the older name, it was retained following the taxonomic Principle of Priority. The Hagerman fossils represent some of the oldest widely accepted remains of the genus Equus.

The genus placement of the species is controversial, with some authors choosing to place the species in Plesippus instead. A 2019 phylogenetic analysis found it to be more closely related to living Equus than to Hippidion or Dinohippus, but outside the group containing all living equines.

== Evolution ==
The earliest remains of Equus simplicidens date to the Pliocene, around 4.1-3.2 million years ago. Equus simplicidens has been suggested to be the ancestor of the Eurasian "stenonine" equines such as Equus stenonis, which first appeared in Eurasia at the beginning of the Pleistocene, around 2.6 million years ago, which have been proposed to be the ancestors of living zebras and asses. The youngest fossils of E. simplicidens date to the Irvingtonian.

== Description ==
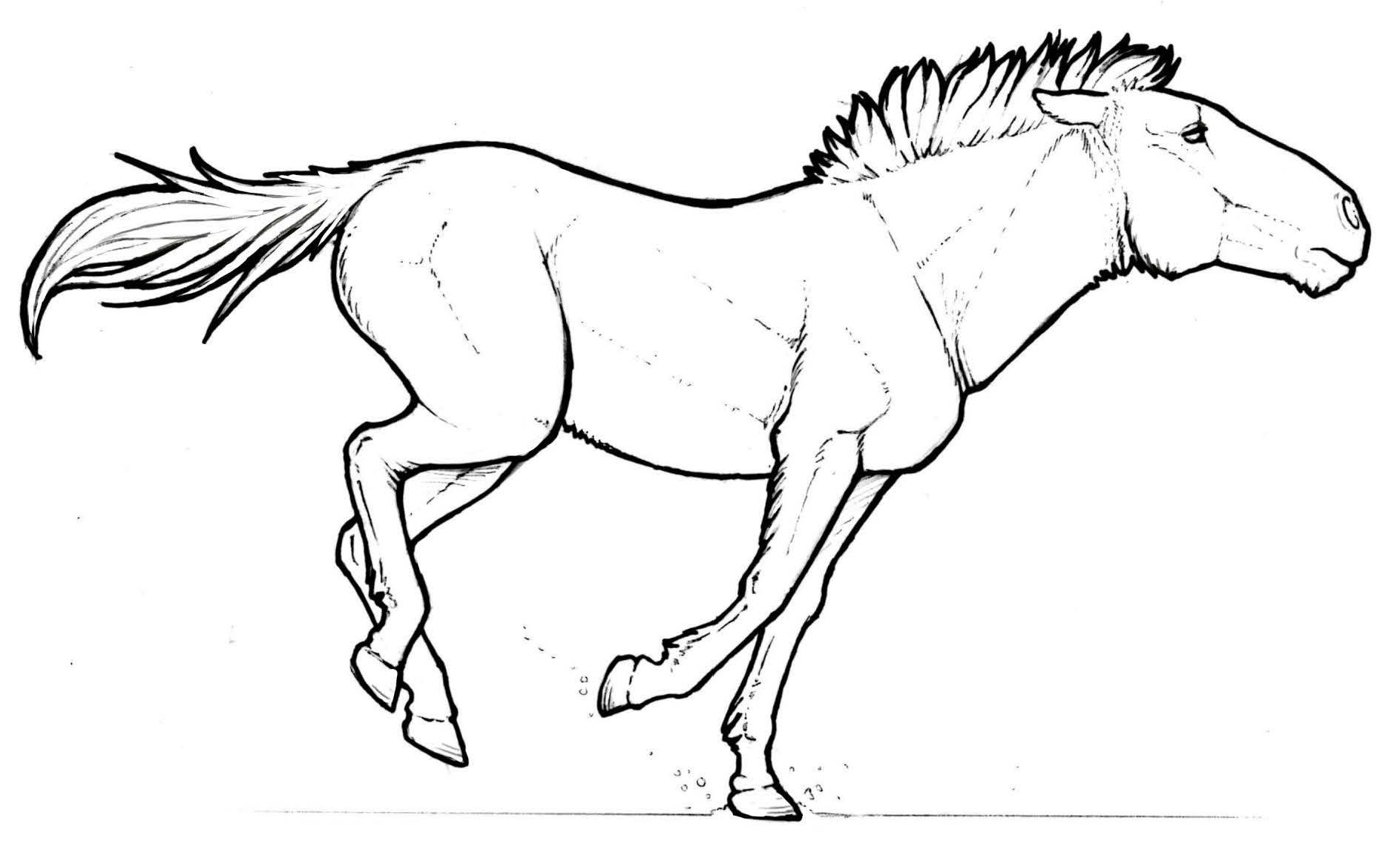
Life restoration

The body mass of adult Equus simplicidens been estimated at 300–400 kilograms (660–880 lb) in life, comparable to a zebra. The overall form of the skull has been considered comparable to those of zebras, though the dental morphology is more primitive. The vomer bone of the skull is noticeably elongated, with the preorbital fossa being relatively large. The ramus of the mandible is angled posteriorly.

== Distribution ==
Remains of Equus simplicidens are known from across Western and Central North America, including Idaho, Arizona, California, Texas, Nebraska, Kansas, and further southward down towards Mexico.

== Ecology ==
Equus simplicidens is thought to have had a highly abrasive almost exclusively grazing based diet, similar to that of modern equines, particularly zebras. The species is suggested to have had a herding social structure similar to living Equus, perhaps led by a dominant harem stallion male similar to living horses.

== See also ==
- Equus scotti
