= David W. Horohov =

American veterinary scientist

David W. Horohov is a retired American veterinary scientist and was the William Robert Mills Chair in Equine Infectious Diseases at University of Kentucky.
