= Fishtail projectile point =

Type of projectile point used in South America during the Late Pleistocene

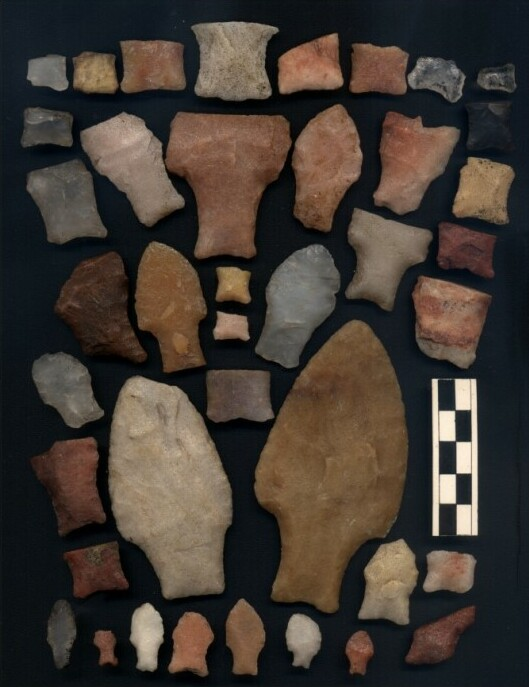
Variety of Fishtail projectile points (both whole and fragments) found in Argentina and Chile

Fishtail points, also known as Fell points, are a style of Paleoindian projectile point widespread across much of South America at the end of the Late Pleistocene, around 13-12,000 years ago. They are thought to have been multifunctional, serving as cutting tools, as well as hafted to spears to use as hunting weapons, possibly in combination with spear throwers. Fishtail points have been found in association with extinct Pleistocene megafauna, such as the equine Hippidion, and it has been argued that hunting using these points may have been a factor in their extinction.

== Chronology and origin ==
Their chronological timing is disputed. Some authors favour a short chronology spanning 12,800–12,200 years Before Present (BP), while others favour a long chronology spanning 13,500–10,200 years BP. It is the earliest widespread lithic style in South America, being contemporaneous in its earlier stages to the use of Clovis points in North America. Fishtail points may be derived from Clovis points, or possibly from Fishtail-like points found on the Gulf Coast of North America and in Central America.

== Description, use and association with other tools ==
The name "Fishtail point" derives from their fish-like shape, with broad shoulders, indented stems and flared bases, while the name "Fell point" originally given by Junius Bird derives from Cueva Fell (Fell's Cave) in southern Patagonia, where the first points were found. They are typically bifacially thinned, though some unifacial Fishtail points are known. The points were manufactured from blanks with a combination of percussive flaking and pressure flaking. In comparison to Clovis points, Fishtail points are often but not always fluted (having a long flake running along the length of the point removed, leaving a groove at the base).

In Uruguay, Fishtail points were most often manufactured from silcrete (54%), with other source rocks including chert (10%) jasper (9%) quartzite (7%) opal (7%) and quartz (5%), while in the Tandilia Range of the Argentine Pampas, local quartzite was preferred (>75%).

Fishtail points varied significantly in size and form, and many were likely hafted to spears, which were possibly used in combination with spear throwers, though some are suggested to have served other purposes, like as knives or as cutting tools, and the same point may have been used for multiple functions. Following being damaged, the points were often later recycled into burins or cutting tools, or less often scrapers or other lithic types, sometimes in combination on the same artefact. Other lithic tools utilized by Fishtail producing peoples include blades.

== Distribution ==
Fishtail points have the highest find frequency in the open regions of the Pampas and Patagonia, but are also found with some frequency in the Andes, extending as far north as Ecuador. While Brazilian finds are most common in Southern Brazil, some finds are also known from central, northern and northeastern Brazil, including in the states of Mato Grosso, Goiás, Amazonas and Bahia. Finds in Patagonia extend to the farthest south of the region, including Tierra del Fuego.

Like the Clovis culture, the people who produced Fishtail points were willing to transport rocks and stone tools hundreds of kilometers away from the original outcrop, in one case 482 kilometres (300 mi), which may have been the result of exchanges between different groups.

== Lifestyle ==
The people who produced Fishtail points are suggested to have been highly-mobile hunter-gatherers. Fishtail points are suggested to have been utilized for big-game hunting of megafaunal mammals and the peak abundance of the points coincides with the proposed extinction interval for most large mammals in South America as part of the Late Pleistocene megafauna extinctions. This suggests that the hunting may have had a causal role in the extinctions. Fishtail points disappeared following the extinction of the megafauna, and were replaced by projectile point styles better suited for hunting smaller prey.

=== Association with extinct megafauna ===
Direct association between Fishtail points and extinct megafauna are rare, though such an association is preserved at several sites. These include Piedra Museo in Santa Cruz Province in Southern Argentina and in Cueva del Medio in southern Chile, where Fishtail points were found in association with the extinct equine Hippidion saldiasi, some of which show cut marks indicative of butchery. Evidence of hunting of members of the living llama genus Lama was also found at both sites. At both sites the extinct large ground sloth Mylodon was also found. While there is no clear evidence for its consumption at Cueva del Medio, cut marks were found on a mylodont rib at Piedra Museo. At the Paso Otero 5 site in the Pampas of northeast Argentina, Fishtail points are associated with burned bones of the elephant-sized giant ground sloths Megatherium americanum and Lestodon, the somewhat smaller but still large ground sloths Scelidotherium, Glossotherium and Mylodon, the glyptodont Glyptodon, the equine Equus neogeus, the rhinoceros-like ungulate Toxodon, the camel-like ungulate Macrauchenia, and the extinct llama Hemiauchenia. The bones appear to have been deliberately burned as a source of fuel. Due to the poor preservation of the bones, there is no clear evidence of human modification, with the possible exception of a fracture on a Hemiauchenia tibia; however, it has been argued that the animals present at the site had probably been consumed prior to burning, whether procured by hunting or scavenging.
