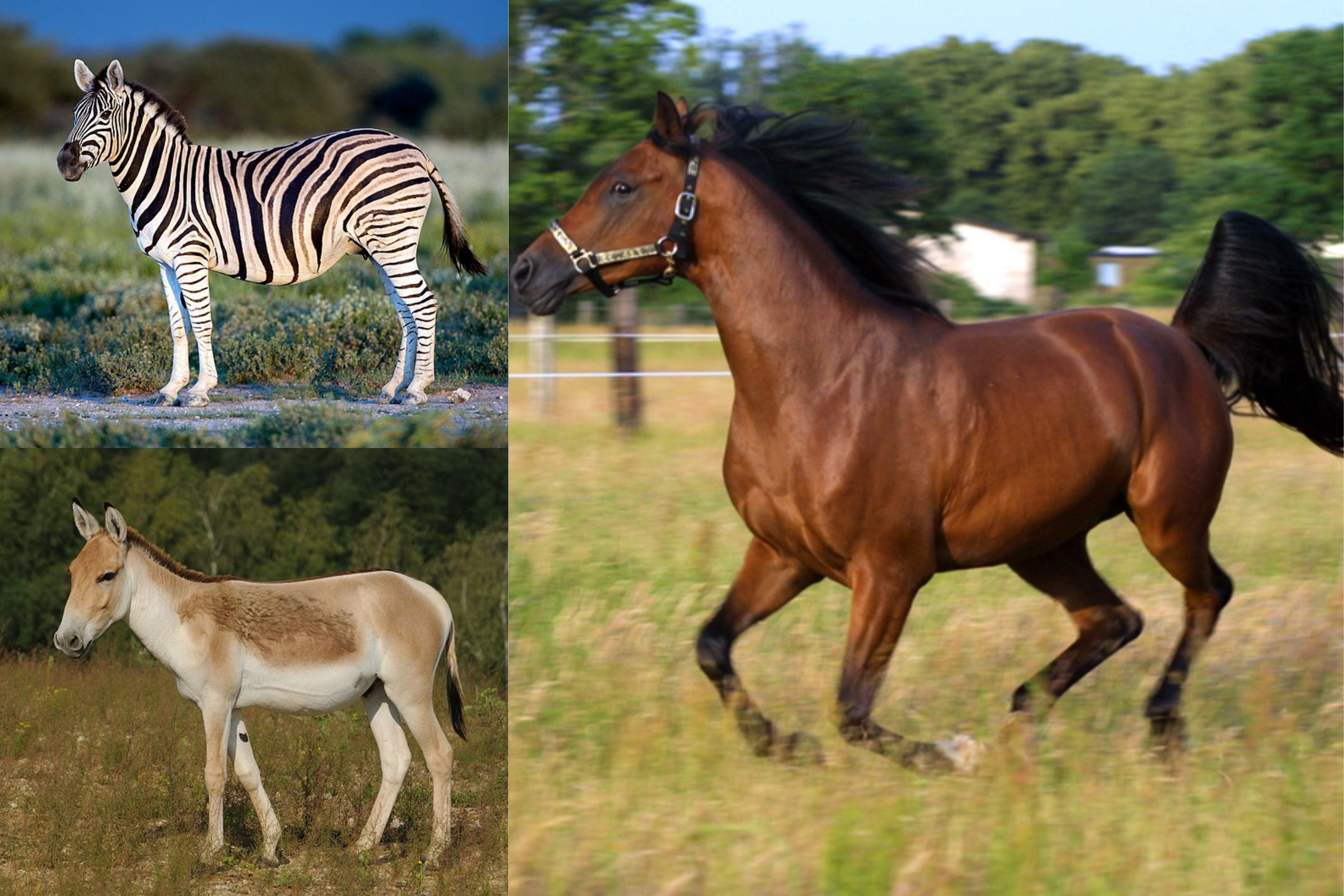
- Clockwise (from top left): plains zebra (E. quagga), domestic horse (E. f. caballus), onager (E. hemionus)

Scientific classification
- Kingdom: Animalia
- Phylum: Chordata
- Class: Mammalia
- Order: Perissodactyla
- Family: Equidae
- Subtribe: Equina
- Genus: Equus; Linnaeus, 1758

Type species
- Equus caballus Linnaeus, 1758

Extant species
- Horses; E. caballus (domestic horse); E. ferus (wild horse); Asses (Asinus); E. africanus (African wild ass and domestic donkey); E. hemionus (onager or Asiatic wild ass); E. kiang (kiang or Tibetan wild ass); Zebras (Hippotigris); E. grevyi (Grévy's zebra); E. quagga (plains zebra); E. zebra (mountain zebra)
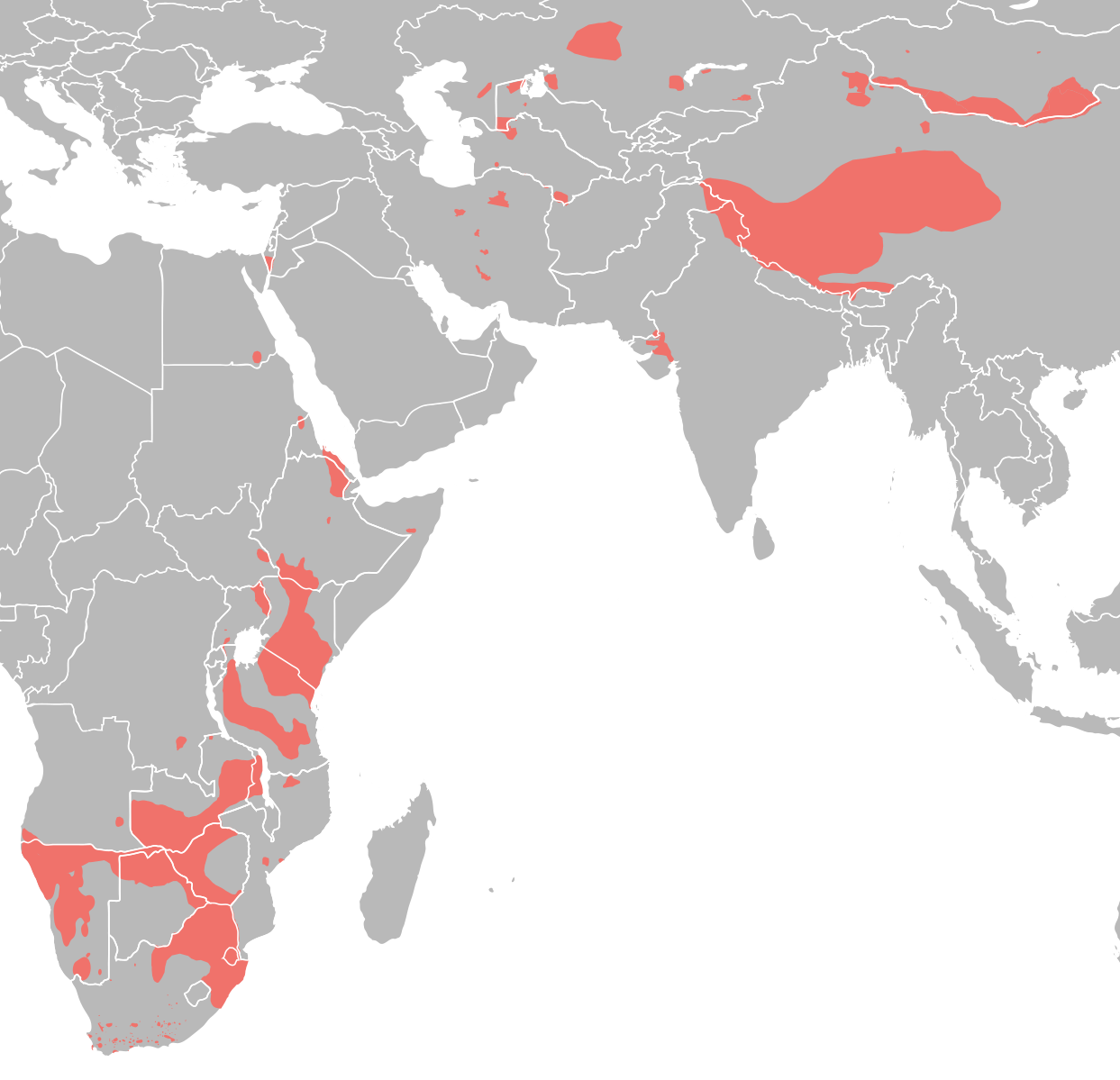
- Equus distribution (excluding domesticated horse and donkey)

= Equus (genus) =

Equus Temporal range: 5.33–0 Ma Earliest Pliocene to recent

Genus of mammals that includes horses, asses, and zebras

Equus (/ˈɛkwəs, ˈiːkwəs/) is a genus of herbivorous mammals in the perissodactyl (odd-toed ungulates) family Equidae, which includes horses, asses and zebras. Within the Equidae, Equus is the only recognized extant taxon, comprising eight living species, as well as numerous extinct species known only from fossils. All members of the genus are cursorial quadrupeds with slender unguligrade (toe walking) legs, long-snouted head with hypsodonty, relatively long necks with dorsal manes (erect in most subspecies), and long multi-stranded tail. They are mostly pseudoruminant grazers with simpler digestive systems than ruminants but able to subsist on lower-quality vegetation.

The genus originated in North America during the Eocene and dispersed into the Old World and South America during the Early and Middle Pleistocene. While the domestic horse breeds and donkeys now exist worldwide due to human introduction and husbandry, wild equine populations are limited only to Africa and Asia and threatened by human activities. Equines are social animals that communicate with each other both visually and vocally, and wild equine social systems are in two forms; a harem system with tight-knit familial herds consisting of one adult alpha male (known as the stallion for horse and zebras, or jackass for donkeys), several females (i.e. mares for horse and zebras, or jennets for donkeys), and their juveniles (i.e. foals, more specifically colts for males and fillies for females), while grown beta males live in separate bachelor herds; or a territorial system where different males establish individual domains with resources that attract females, which associate very fluidly. In both systems, females predominantly take care of parenting the offspring, but males may play a role as well.

== Etymology ==
The word equus is Latin for "horse" and is cognate with the Greek ἵππος (hippos, "horse") and Mycenaean Greek i-qo /ikkʷos/, the earliest attested variant of the Greek word, written in Linear B syllabic script. Compare the alternative development of the Proto-Greek labiovelar in Ionic ἴκκος (ikkos).

== Taxonomic and evolutionary history ==
- Equus
  - Horses
    - E. caballus
    - †E. ferus ferus
    - E. ferus przewalskii
  - - - Zebras
        - E. zebra
        - - E. grevyi
          - E. quagga
            - E. quagga chapmani
            - †E. quagga quagga
      - Asses
        - - E. africanus africanus
          - E. africanus somaliensis
        - - E. kiang
          - - E. hemionus kulan
            - E. hemionus onager

Cladogram of Equus after Vilstrup et al. (2013).

The genus Equus was first described by Carl Linnaeus in 1758. It is the only recognized extant genus in the family Equidae. The first equids were small, dog-sized mammals (e.g. Eohippus) adapted for browsing on shrubs during the Eocene, around 54 million years ago (Mya). These animals had three toes on the hind feet and four on the front feet with small hooves in place of claws, but also had soft pads. Equids developed into larger, three-toed animals (e.g. Mesohippus) during the Oligocene and Miocene. From there, the side toes became progressively smaller through the Pleistocene until the emergence of the single-toed Equus.

The genus Equus, which includes all extant equines, is believed to have evolved from Dinohippus, via the intermediate form Plesippus. One of the oldest species is Equus simplicidens, described as zebra-like with a donkey-like head shape. The oldest material to date was found in Idaho, USA. The genus appears to have spread quickly into the Old World, with the similarly aged E. livenzovensis documented from western Europe and Russia. Molecular phylogenies indicate that the most recent common ancestor of all modern equines (members of the genus Equus) lived ~5.6 (3.9-7.8) Mya. Direct paleogenomic sequencing of a 700,000-year-old middle Pleistocene horse metapodial bone from Canada implies a more recent 4.07 Mya for the most recent common ancestor within the range of 4.0 to 4.5 Mya.

Mitochondrial evidence supports the division of Equus species into noncaballoid (which includes zebras and asses) and caballoids or "true horses" (which includes E. caballus and E. ferus przewalskii, alternatively E. przewalskii). Of the extant equine species, the lineage of the asses may have diverged first, possibly as soon as Equus reached the Old World. Zebras appear to be monophyletic and differentiated in Africa, where they are endemic. Members of the subgenus Sussemionus were abundant during the Early and Middle Pleistocene of North America and Afro-Eurasia, but only a single species, Equus ovodovi survived into the Late Pleistocene and Holocene in south Siberia and China, with the youngest remains from China dating to around 3500 BP (1500 BC), during the Shang dynasty. Genetic data from E. ovodovi has placed the Sussemionus lineage as closer to zebras and asses than to caballine horses.

Molecular dating indicates the caballoid lineage diverged from the noncaballoids 4 Mya. Genetic results suggest that all North American fossils of caballine equines, as well as South American fossils traditionally placed in the subgenus E. (Amerhippus), belong to E. ferus. Remains attributed to a variety of species and lumped together as New World stilt-legged horses (including E. francisci, E. tau, and E. quinni) probably all belong to a second species that was endemic to North America. This was confirmed in a genetic study done in 2017, which subsumed all the specimens into the species E. francisci which was placed outside all extant horse species in the new genus Haringtonhippus, although its placement as a separate genus was subsequently questioned. A separate genus of horse, Hippidion existed in South America. The possible causes of the extinction of horses in the Americas (about 12,000 years ago) have been a matter of debate. Hypotheses include climatic change and overexploitation by newly arrived humans. Horses only returned to the American mainland with the arrival of the conquistadores in 1519.

=== Extant species ===
Subgenus	Image	Scientific name	Common name	Distribution
Equus (Horses)	Nokota Horses cropped	Equus ferus przewalskii / E. przewalskii and Equus caballus	(Przewalski's horse and domesticated horse)	Eurasia
Asinus (Asses)		Equus africanus	African wild ass (includes domesticated donkey)	Horn of Africa, in Eritrea, Ethiopia and Somalia
Asinus (Asses)		Equus hemionus	Onager, hemione, or Asiatic wild ass	Iran, Pakistan, India, and Mongolia, including in Central Asian hot and cold deserts of Kazakhstan, Uzbekistan, Turkmenistan, and China
Asinus (Asses)		Equus kiang	Kiang	Tibetan Plateau
Hippotigris (Zebras)		Equus grevyi	Grévy's zebra	Kenya and Ethiopia
Hippotigris (Zebras)		Equus quagga	Plains zebra	south of Ethiopia through East Africa to as far south as Botswana and eastern South Africa
Hippotigris (Zebras)		Equus zebra	Mountain zebra	south-western Angola, Namibia and South Africa.

=== Prehistoric species ===
Many extinct prehistoric species of Equus have been described. The validity of some of these species is questionable and a matter of debate. For example, Equus niobrarensis is likely synonymous with Equus scotti, while Equus alaskae is most likely the same species as Equus lambei, which itself may be a North American form of the living Equus przewalskii.

DNA studies on American horse remains found frozen into permafrost have shown that several of the supposed American species, as well as the European Equus ferus, are actually a single highly-variable widespread species, as if the evolutionary process of speciation was persistently being frustrated by large herds moving long distances and mixing.

- American species
  - Equus alaskae – Alaskan horse
  - Equus conversidens – Mexican horse
  - Equus fraternus
  - Equus francisi – now placed in a separate genus, Haringtonhippus
  - Equus giganteus – Giant horse
  - Equus lambei – Yukon horse
  - Equus neogeus – often placed in a separate genus, Amerhippus
  - Equus niobrarensis – Niobrara horse
  - Equus occidentalis – Western horse
  - Equus scotti – Scott's horse
  - Equus semiplicatus
  - Equus simplicidens – Hagerman horse
- Eurasian species
  - Equus altidens
  - Equus major
  - Equus suessenbornensis
  - Equus livenzovensis
  - Equus senezensis
  - Equus dalianensis
  - Equus lenensis – Siberian horse
  - Equus latipes
  - Equus hydruntinus – European wild ass
  - Equus namadicus
  - Equus ovodovi
  - Equus yunnanensis
  - Equus stenonis – Stenon zebra
  - Equus sivalensis - Sivalik horse
- African species
  - Equus algericus
  - Equus capensis – Giant zebra
  - Equus mauritanicus – Saharan zebra

=== Domestic species ===
- Equus caballus – Domestic horse
- Equus asinus – Domestic donkey

=== Hybrids ===
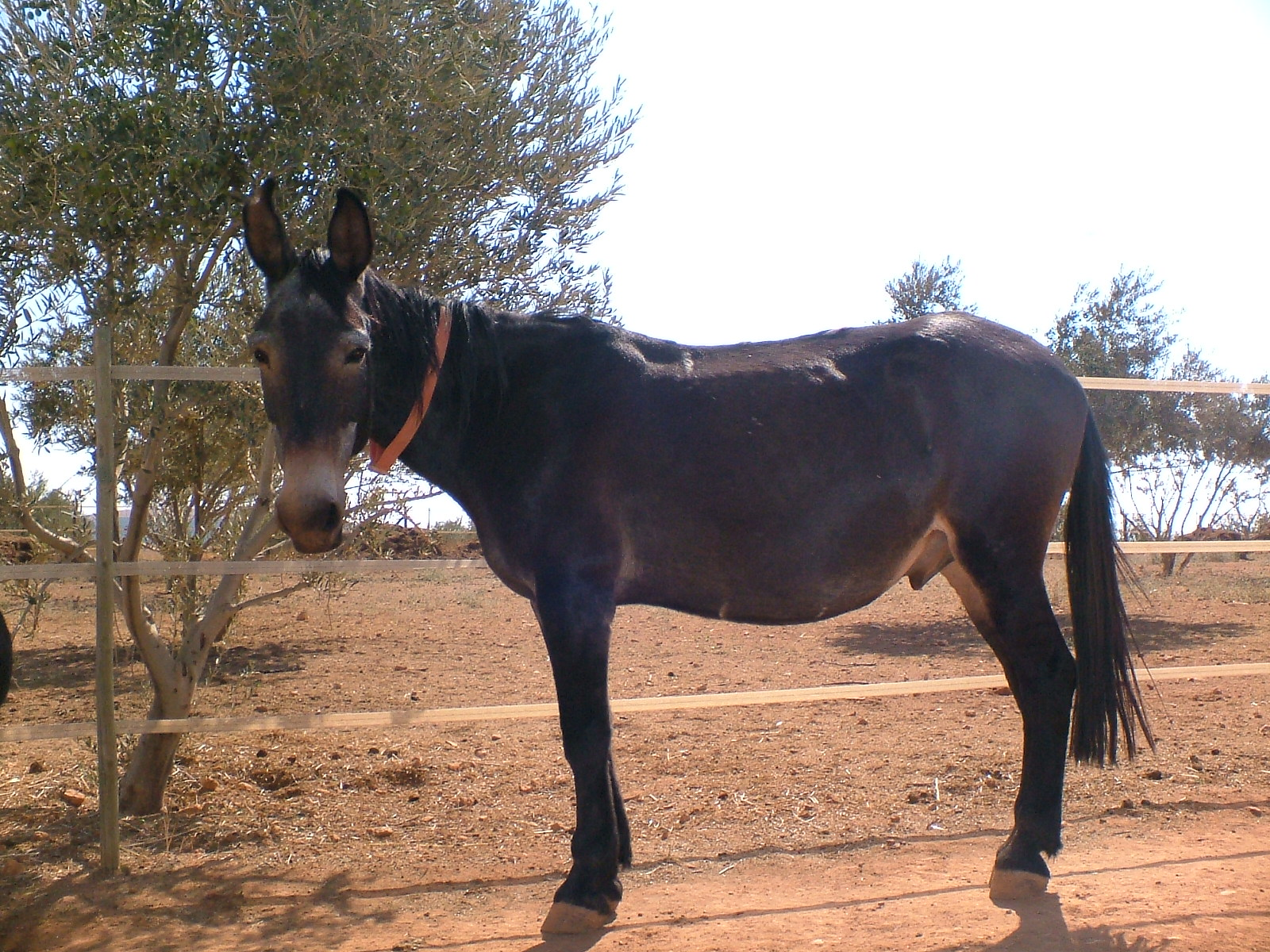
A mule (horse and donkey hybrid)

Equine species can crossbreed with each other. The most common hybrid is the mule, a cross between a male donkey and a female horse. With rare exceptions, these hybrids are sterile and cannot reproduce. A related hybrid, a hinny, is a cross between a male horse and a female donkey. Other hybrids include the zorse, a cross between a zebra and a horse and a zonkey or zedonk, a hybrid of a zebra and a donkey. In areas where Grévy's zebras are sympatric with plains zebras, fertile hybrids do occur. Ancient DNA identifies the Bronze Age kunga as a cross between the Syrian wild ass and the donkey.

== Biology ==
=== Physical characteristics ===
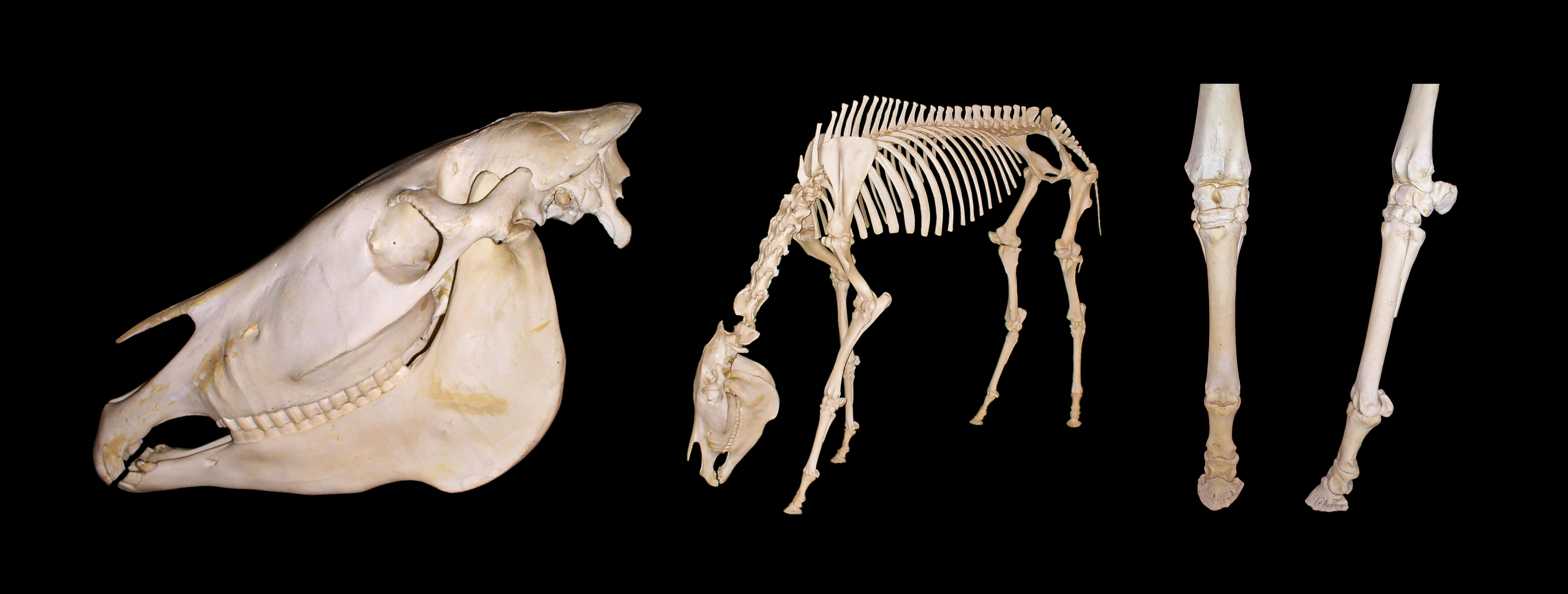
From left to right: a cranium, a complete skeleton, a left forefoot frontal, and a left forefoot lateral from a Grévy's zebra

Equines have significant differences in size, though all are characterized by long heads and necks. Their slender legs support their weight on one digit (which evolved from the middle digits). Grévy's zebra is the largest wild species, standing up to 13.2 hands (54 inches, 137 cm) and weighing up to 405 kg (890 lb). Domesticated horses have a wider range of sizes. Heavy or draft horses are usually at least 16 hands (64 inches, 163 cm) high and can be as tall as 18 hands (72 inches, 183 cm) and weigh from about 700 to 1,000 kg (1,500 to 2,200 lb). Some miniature horses are no taller than 30 inches (76 cm) in adulthood. Sexual dimorphism is limited in equines. The penis of the male is vascular and lacks a bone (baculum). Equines are adapted for running and traveling over long distances. Their dentition is adapted for grazing; they have large incisors that clip grass blades and highly crowned, ridged molars well suited for grinding. Males have spade-shaped canines ("tushes"), which can be used as weapons in fighting. Equines have fairly good senses, particularly their eyesight. Their moderately long, erect ears are movable and can locate the source of a sound.

A dun-colored coat with primitive markings that include a dorsal stripe and often leg striping and transverse shoulder stripes reflect the wildtype coat and are observed in most wild extant equine species. Only the mountain zebra lacks a dorsal stripe. In domestic horses, dun color and primitive markings exist in some animals across many breeds. The purpose of the bold black-and-white striping of zebras has been a subject of debate among biologists for over a century, but 2014 evidence supports the theory that they are a form of protection from biting flies. These insects appear to be less attracted to striped coats, and compared to other wild equines, zebras live in areas with the highest fly activity. With the exception of the domestic horses, which have long manes that lay over the neck and long tail hair growing from the top of the tailhead or dock, most equines have erect manes and long tails ending in a tuft of hair. The coats of some equine species undergo shedding in certain parts of their range and are thick in the winter.

=== Ecology and daily activities ===
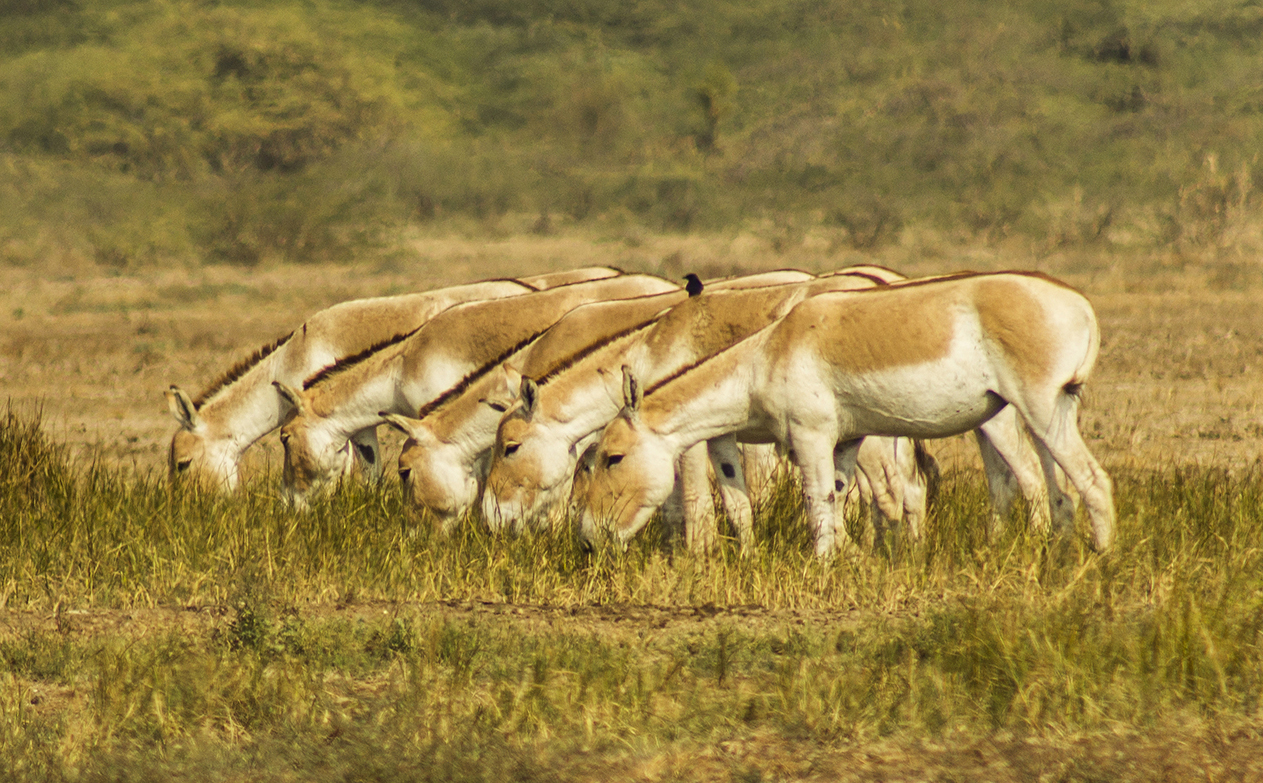
Group of onagers grazing

Extant wild equines have scattered ranges across Africa and Asia. The plains zebra lives in lush grasslands and savannas of Eastern and Southern Africa, while the mountain zebra inhabits mountainous areas of southwest Africa. The other equine species tend to occupy more arid environments with more scattered vegetation. Grévy's zebra is found in thorny scrubland of East Africa, while the African wild ass inhabits rocky deserts of North Africa. The two Asian wild ass species live in the dry deserts of the Near East and Central Asia and Przwelski's wild horse's habitat is the deserts of Mongolia. Only the range of the plains and Grévy's zebras overlap. In addition to wild populations, domesticated horses and donkeys are widespread due to humans. In certain parts of the world, populations of feral horses and feral donkeys exist, which are descended from domesticated animals that were released or escaped into the wild.

Equines are monogastric hindgut fermenters. They prefer to eat grasses and sedges, but they, particularly asses, may also consume bark, leaves, buds, fruits, and roots if their favored foods are scarce. Compared to ruminants, they have a simpler and less efficient digestive system. Nevertheless, they can subsist on lower-quality vegetation. After food is passed through the stomach, it enters the sac-like cecum, where cellulose is broken down by micro-organisms. Fermentation is quicker in equines than in ruminants—30–45 hours for a horse compared to 70–100 hours for cattle. Equines may spend 60–80% of their time feeding, depending on the availability and quality of vegetation. In the African savannas, the plains zebra is a pioneer grazer, mowing down the upper, less nutritious grass canopy and preparing the way for more specialized grazers such as blue wildebeests and Thomson's gazelles, which depend on shorter and more nutritious grasses below.

Wild equines may spend seven hours a day sleeping. During the day, they sleep standing up, while at night they lie down. They regularly rub against trees, rocks, and other objects and roll around in dust for protection against flies and irritation. Except the mountain zebra, wild equines can roll over completely.

=== Social behavior ===
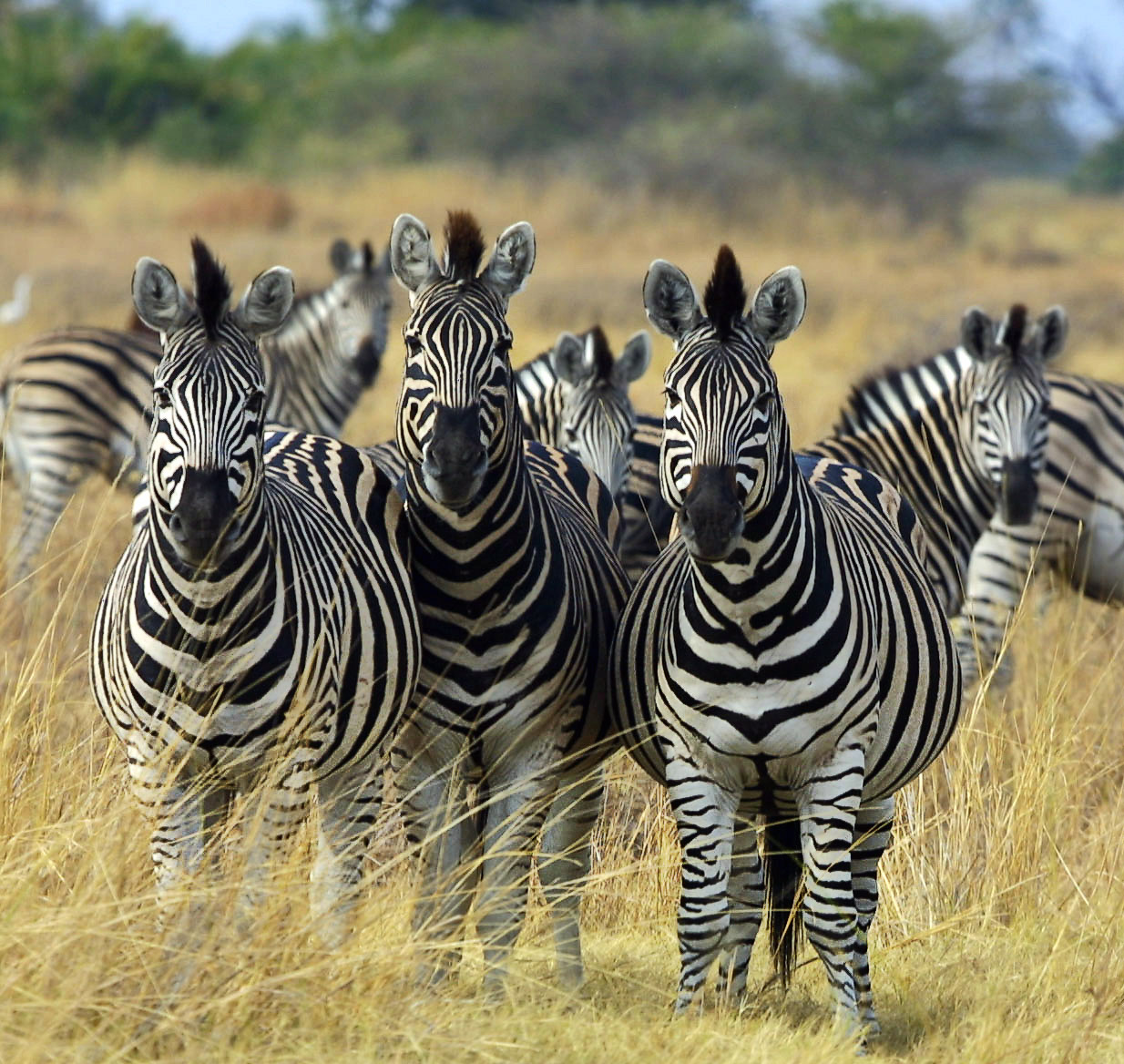
Plains zebra group

Equines are social animals with two basic social structures.

Horses, plains zebras, and mountain zebras live in stable, closed family groups or harems consisting of one adult male, several females, and their offspring. These groups have their own home ranges, which overlap and they tend to be nomadic. The stability of the group remains even when the family stallion dies or is displaced. Plains zebra groups gather into large herds and may create temporarily stable subgroups within a herd, allowing individuals to interact with those outside their group. Among harem-holding species, this behavior has only otherwise been observed in primates such as the gelada and the hamadryas baboon. Females of harem species benefit as males give them more time for feeding, protection for their young, and protection from predators and harassment by outside males. Among females in a harem, a linear dominance hierarchy exists based on the time at which they join the group. Harems travel in a consistent filing order with the high-ranking mares and their offspring leading the groups followed by the next-highest ranking mare and her offspring, and so on. The family stallion takes up the rear. Social grooming (which involves individuals rubbing their heads against each other and nipping with the incisors and lips) is important for easing aggression and maintaining social bonds and status. Young of both sexes leave their natal groups as they mature; females are usually abducted by outside males to be included as permanent members of their harems.

In Grévy's zebras and the wild ass species, adults have more fluid associations and adult males establish large territories and monopolize the females that enter them. These species live in habitats with sparser resources and standing water, and grazing areas may be separated. Groups of lactating females are able to remain in groups with nonlactating ones and usually gather at foraging areas. The most dominant males establish territories near watering holes, where more sexually receptive females gather. Subdominants have territories farther away, near foraging areas. Mares may wander through several territories, but remain in one when they have young. Staying in a territory offers a female protection from harassment by outside males, as well as access to a renewable resource. Some feral populations of horses exhibit features of both the harem and territorial social systems.

In both equine social systems, excess males gather in bachelor groups. These are typically young males that are not yet ready to establish a harem or territory. With the plains zebra, the males in a bachelor group have strong bonds and have a linear dominance hierarchy. Fights between males usually occur over estrous females and involve biting and kicking.

=== Communication ===
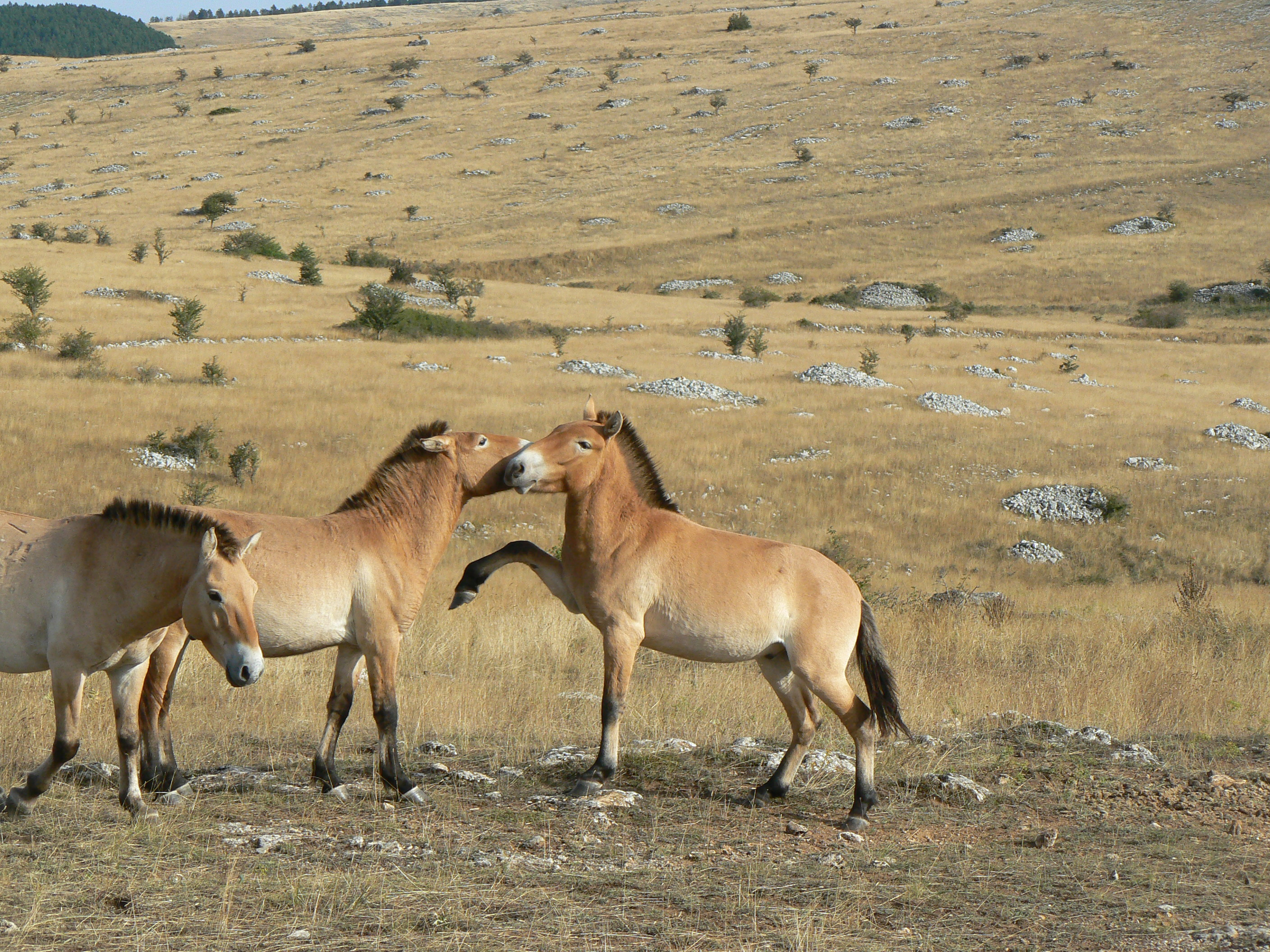
Przewalski's horses interacting

When meeting for the first time or after they have separated, individuals may greet each other by rubbing and sniffing their noses followed by rubbing their cheeks, moving their noses along their bodies and sniffing each other's genitals. They then may rub and press their shoulders against each other and rest their heads on one another. This greeting is usually performed among harem or territorial males or among bachelor males playing.

Equines produce a number of vocalizations and noises. Loud snorting is associated with alarm. Squealing is usually made when in pain, but bachelors also squeal while play fighting. The contact calls of equines vary from the whinnying and nickering of the horse and the barking of plains zebras to the braying of asses, Grévy's zebras, and donkeys. Equines also communicate with visual displays, and the flexibility of their lips allows them to make complex facial expressions. Visual displays also incorporate the positions of the head, ears, and tail. An equine may signal an intention to kick by laying back its ears and sometimes lashing the tail. Flattened ears, bared teeth, and abrupt movement of the heads may be used as threatening gestures, particularly among stallions.

=== Reproduction and parenting ===
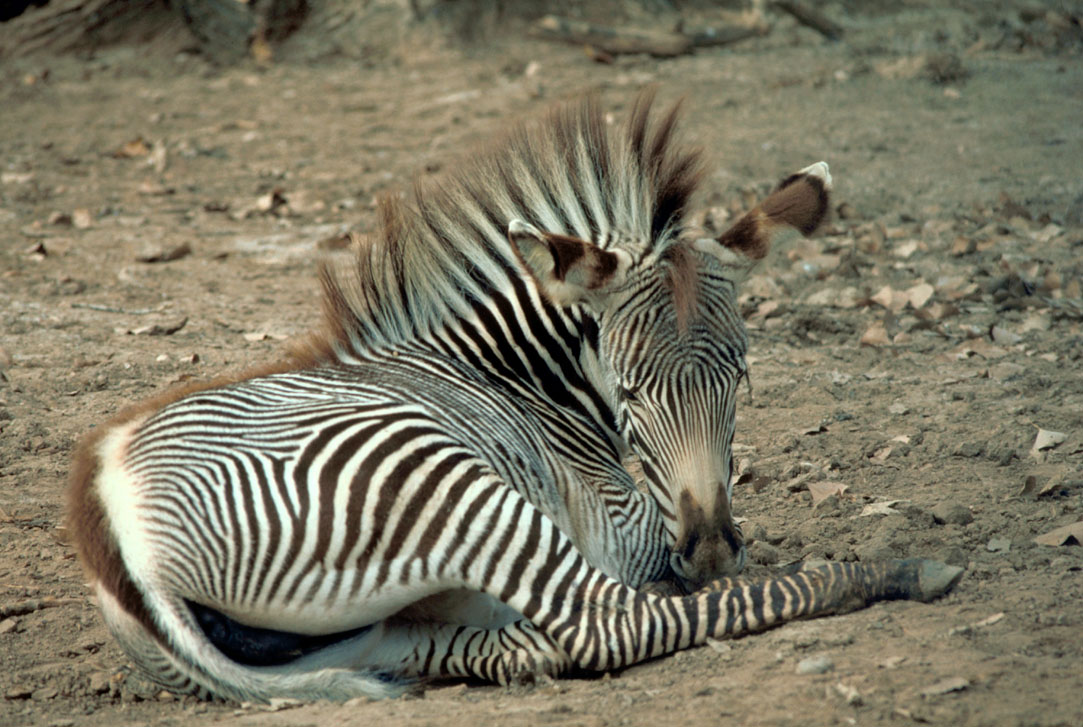
Grévy's zebra foal

Among harem-holding species, the adult females mate only with their harem stallion, while in other species, mating is more promiscuous and the males have larger testes for sperm competition. Estrus in female equines lasts 5–10 days; physical signs include frequent urination, flowing muscus, and swollen, everted labia. In addition, estrous females will stand with their hind legs spread and raise their tails when in the presence of a male. Males assess the female's reproductive state with the flehmen response and the female will solicit mating by backing in. Length of gestation varies by species; it is roughly 11–13 months, and most mares come into estrus again within a few days after foaling, depending on conditions. Usually, only a single foal is born, which is capable of running within an hour. Within a few weeks, foals attempt to graze, but may continue to nurse for 8–13 months. Species in arid habitats, like Grévy's zebra, have longer nursing intervals and do not drink water until they are three months old.

Among harem-holding species, foals are cared for mostly by their mothers, but if threatened by predators, the entire group works together to protect all the young. The group forms a protective front with the foals in the center and the stallion will rush at predators that come too close. In territory-holding species, mothers may gather into small groups and leave their young in "kindergartens" under the guard of a territorial male while searching for water. A Grévy's zebra stallion may look after a foal in his territory to ensure that the mother stays, though it may not be his.

== Human relations ==
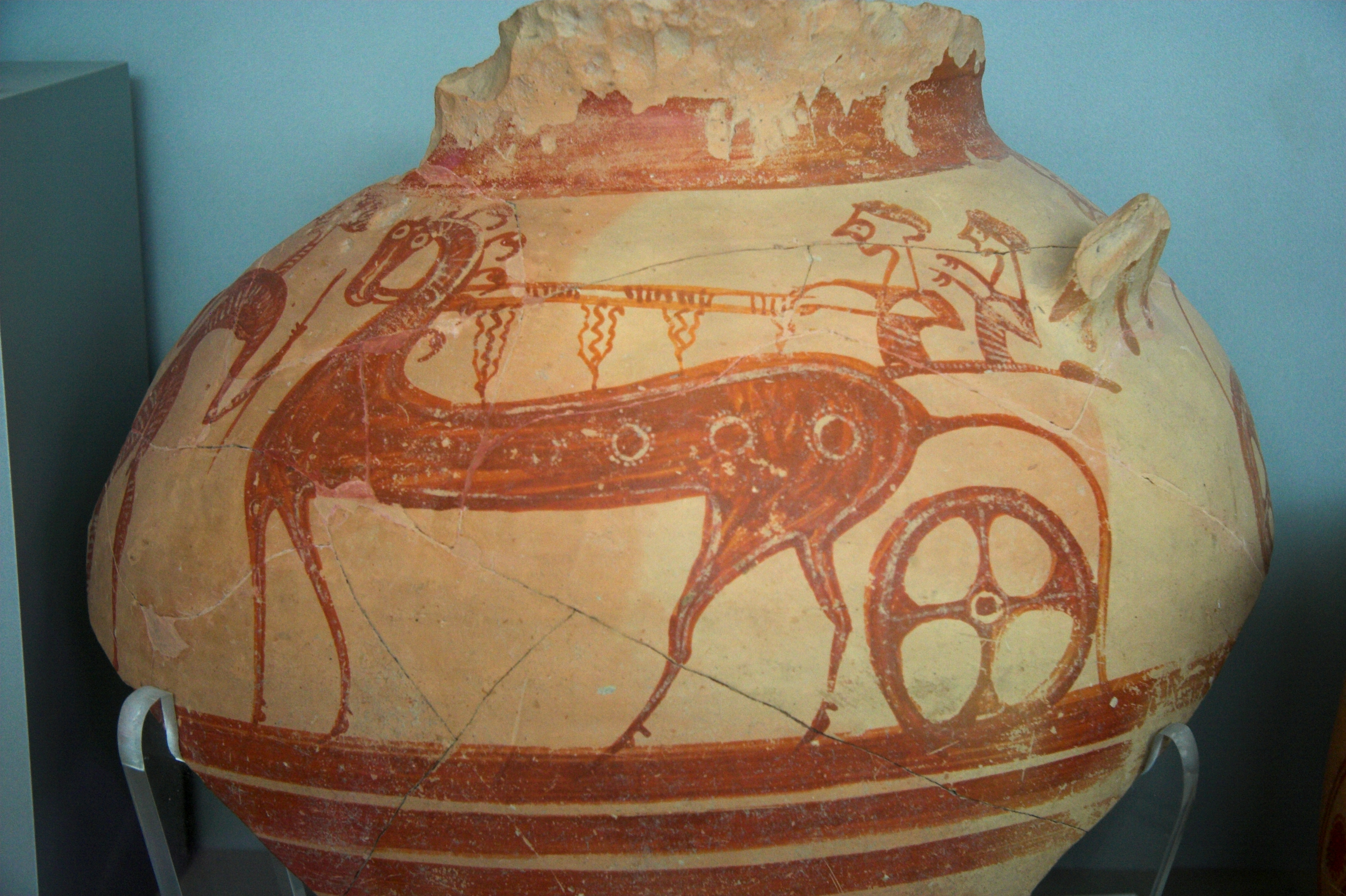
Bronze Age pottery depicting horse and chariot

The earliest archaeological evidence for the domestication of the horse comes from sites in Ukraine and Kazakhstan, dating to around 4000–3500 BCE. By 3000 BCE, the horse was completely domesticated, and by 2000 BCE, a sharp increase occurred in the number of horse bones found in human settlements in northwestern Europe, indicating the spread of domesticated horses throughout the continent. The most recent, but most irrefutable, evidence of domestication comes from sites where horse remains were buried with chariots in graves of the Sintashta and Petrovka cultures c. 2100 BCE. Studies of variation in genetic material shows that a very few wild stallions, possibly all from a single haplotype, contributed to the domestic horse, mating with many mares in early domesticated herds.

Przewalski's horse has been conclusively shown not to be an ancestor of the domestic horse, though the two can hybridize and produce fertile offspring. The split between Przewalskii's horse and E. caballus is estimated to have occurred 120,000–240,000 years ago, long before domestication. Of the caballine equines of E. ferus, E. f. ferus, also known as the European wild horse or "tarpan", shares ancestry with the modern domestic horse. In addition, tarpans that lived into modern times may have been hybridized with domestic horses.

Archaeological, biogeographical, and linguistic evidence suggests that the donkey was first domesticated by nomadic pastoral people in North Africa over 5,000 years ago. The animals were used to help cope with the increased aridity of the Sahara and the Horn of Africa. Genetic evidence finds that the donkey was domesticated twice based on two distinct mitochondrial DNA haplogroups. It also points to a single ancestor, the Nubian wild ass. Attempts to domesticate zebras were largely unsuccessful, though Walter Rothschild trained some to draw a carriage in England.

=== Conservation issues ===
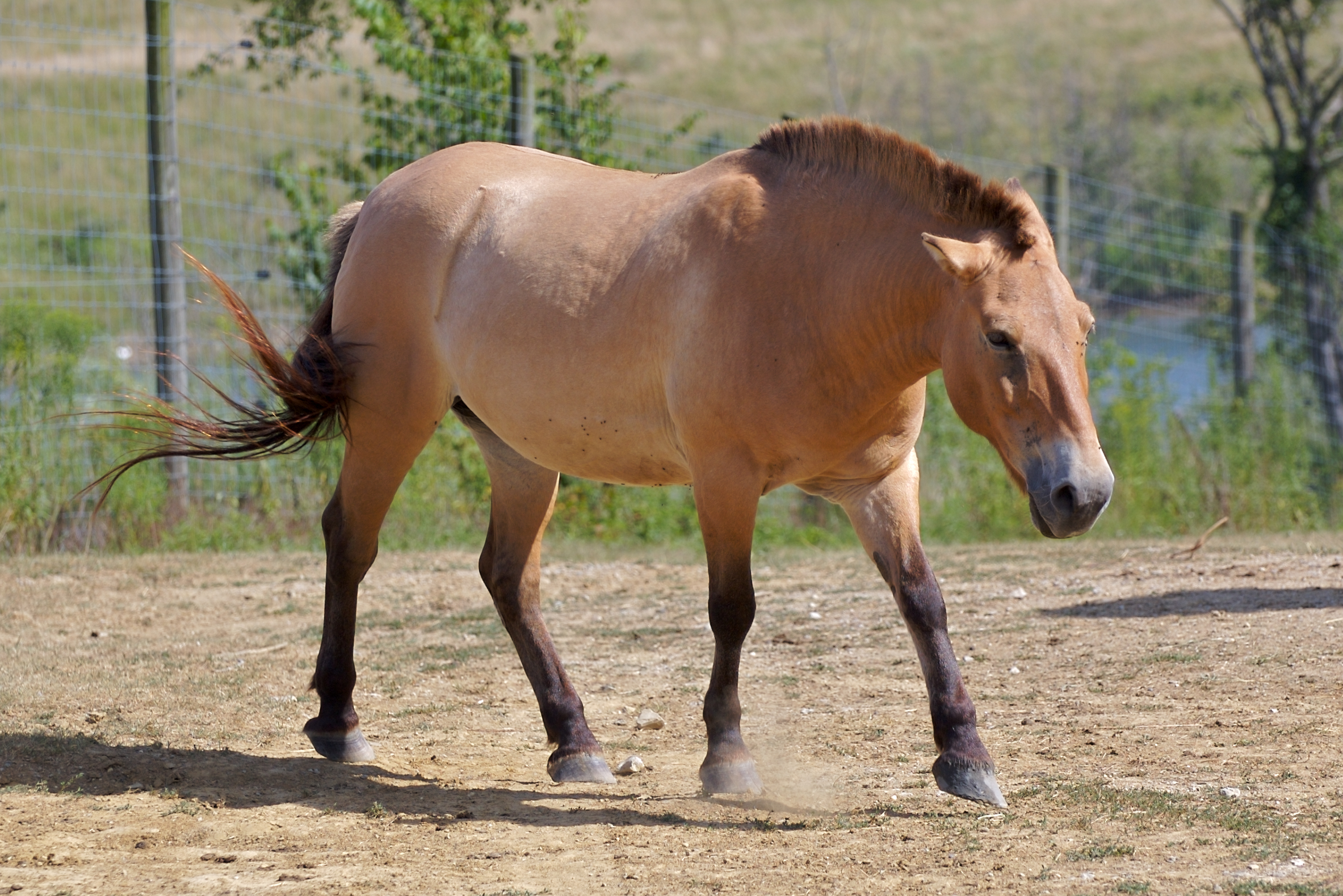
Captive Przewalski's horse

Humans have had a great impact on the populations of wild equines. Threats to wild equines include habitat destruction and conflicts with local people and livestock. Since the 20th century, wild equines have been decimated over many of their former ranges and their populations scattered. In recent centuries, two subspecies, the quagga and the tarpan, became extinct. The IUCN lists the African wild ass as critically endangered, Grévy's zebra, the mountain zebra, and Przewalski's horse as endangered, the onager as vulnerable, the plains zebra as near threatened, and the kiang as least concern. Przewalski's horse was considered to be extinct in the wild from the 1960s to 1996. However, following successful captive breeding, it has been reintroduced in Mongolia.

Feral horses vary in degree of protection and generate considerable controversy. For example, in Australia, they are considered a non-native invasive species, often viewed as pests, though are also considered to have some cultural and economic value. In the United States, feral horses and burros are generally considered an introduced species because they are descendants from domestic horses brought to the Americas from Europe. While they are viewed as pests by many livestock producers, conversely, a view also exists that E. caballus is a reintroduced once-native species returned to the Americas that should be granted endangered species protection. At present, certain free-roaming horses and burros have federal protection as "living symbols of the historic and pioneer spirit of the West" under the Wild and Free-Roaming Horses and Burros Act of 1971, and in Kleppe v. New Mexico, the United States Supreme Court ruled that the animals so designated were, as a matter of law, wildlife.
