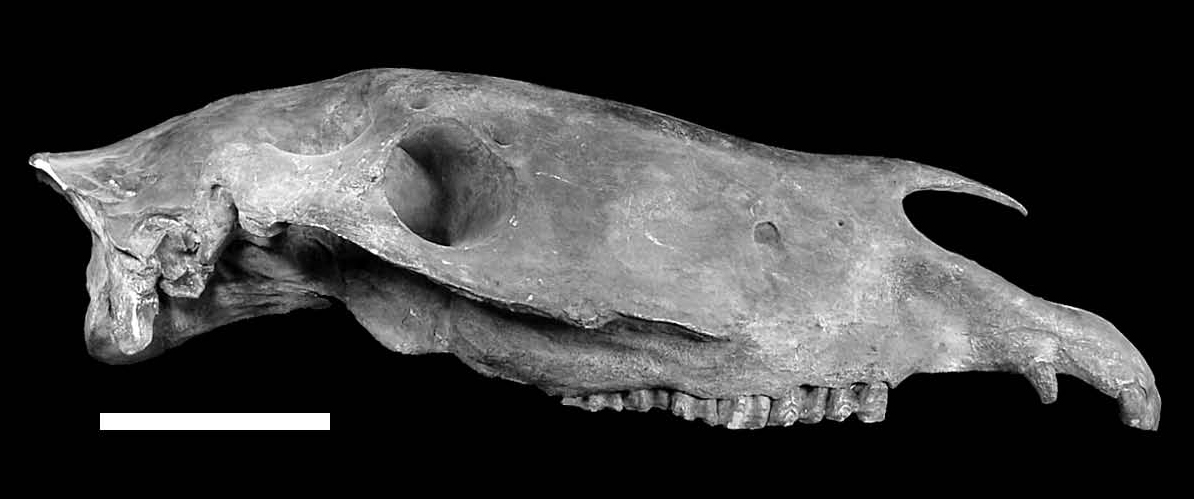
- Skull

Scientific classification
- Kingdom: Animalia
- Phylum: Chordata
- Class: Mammalia
- Order: Perissodactyla
- Family: Equidae
- Genus: Equus
- Species: †E. neogeus

Binomial name
- †Equus neogeus Lund, 1840

Synonyms
- †Equus (Amerhippus) andium; †Equus (Amerhippus) insulatus; †Equus (Amerhippus) lasallei; †Equus (Amerhippus) santaeelenae

= Equus neogeus =

Equus neogeus Temporal range: Pleistocene (Ensenadan-Lujanian) 1–0.012 Ma

Extinct species of equine native to South America

Equus neogeus is an extinct species of equine native to South America during the Pleistocene. It was formerly thought to be several distinct species within the subgenus Amerhippus, but was later shown to be a single morphologically variable species. It is thought to be closely related to true horses.

== Taxonomy ==
While they have formerly been referred to as belonging to 5 separate species, this has been revised down into three, and more recently a single, morphologically variable species Equus neogeus. Some authors continue to recognise three species, restricting Equus neogeus to large-sized individuals spanning from the Pampas to Northeast Brazil, while separating the smaller Equus andium for populations in the northern-central Andes, and Equus insulatus for medium-sized animals spanning from Bolivia to Venezuela. These authors suggest that E. insulatus was the ancestor of the other species. Historically, South American Equus species were placed in the subgenus Amerhippus, but this has subsequently been questioned. A 2008 study of mitochondrial DNA fragments of a specimen of E. neogeus found it to be nested within mitochondrial lineages of E. caballus, however, later studies suggested that this result required more specimens to be analysed for confirmation. A close relationship to caballine horses was also supported by a 2019 morphological analysis study.

== Description ==
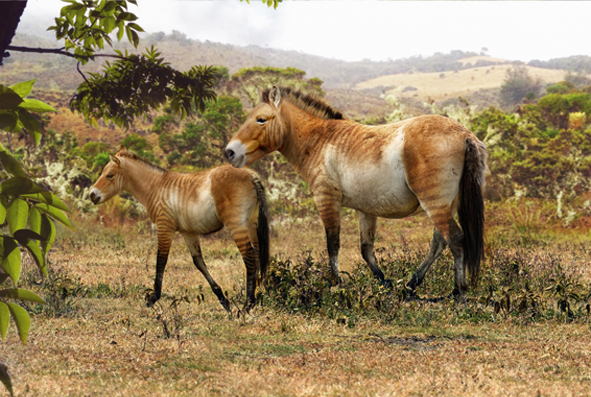
Life restoration

Equus neogeus measured roughly 1.5 m (4.9 ft) tall and weighed approximately 400 kg (880 lb).

== Distribution ==
They were one of two groups of equines in South America, alongside Hippidion. Fossils have been recovered from the Tarija Formation of Bolivia, the Serranía del Perijá in Venezuela, the Chiu-Chiu Formation of Chile, the Sabana Formation of the Bogotá savanna in Colombia, and from various locations in Ecuador. Equus first appeared in South America during the late Early Pleistocene-earliest Middle Pleistocene, around 1 million to 800,000 years ago, based on remains found near Tarija, Bolivia.

== Paleobiology ==
A 2019 study suggested that Equus neogeus specimens from Uruguay were primarily grazers that fed on both C_{4} and C_{3} grasses in prairies and open woodlands.

== Extinction ==
Equus neogeus became extinct at the end of the Late Pleistocene as part of the end-Pleistocene extinctions, along with the vast majority of other large mammals in South America. The youngest remains date to approximately 11,700 years Before Present (BP), in Río Quequén Salado, in the southwest of Buenos Aires province, Argentina. The extinctions followed human arrival to the Americas, and several sites show evidence of human interaction with Equus neogeus, which may have been a factor in its extinction. At the Paso Otero 5 site in the Pampas of northeast Argentina, Fishtail points are associated with burned bones of Equus neogeus and other extinct megafauna. The bones appear to have been deliberately burned as a source of fuel. Due to the poor preservation of the bones there is no clear evidence of human modification. At the Taguatagua 3 in central Chile, dating to around 12,440–12,550 years BP, a first phalanx of Equus was found near a hearth, alongside the remains of other megafauna, including the much more abundant remains of gomphotheres (elephant relatives). At the Arroyo Seco 2 site in the Argentinian Pampas, which has multiple episodes of human activity dating to between 14,782 and 11,142 cal yr BP remains of Equus neogeus (alongside those of other megafauna) are associated with human artifacts and exhibit fracture marks indicative of butchery.
