= Equus suessenbornensis =

Equus suessenbornensis Temporal range: Early Pleistocene–Middle Pleistocene

Scientific classification
- Kingdom: Animalia
- Phylum: Chordata
- Class: Mammalia
- Order: Perissodactyla
- Family: Equidae
- Genus: Equus
- Species: †E. suessenbornensis

Binomial name
- †Equus suessenbornensis Wüst, 1900

Extinct species of mammal

Equus suessenbornensis is an extinct species of large equine native to Western Eurasia, including Europe, during the Early Pleistocene to early Middle Pleistocene.

== Taxonomy ==
The species was first described in 1900 based on remains found at the Sussenborn locality in Germany, dating to the early Middle Pleistocene, around 640–620,000 years ago. Many authors have argued that Equus suessenbornensis should be considered related to other "stenonine" equines from the Early Pleistocene of Europe, such as Equus stenonis, though some authors have argued it should be classified in the subgenus Sussemionus. Recent authors have proposed a particularly close relationship to Equus major , a "stenonine" equine known from the first half of the Early Pleistocene in Europe.

== Description ==
Equus suessenbornensis was a large sized equine having an estimated body mass over 500 kilograms (1,100 lb), with some individuals exceeding 650 kilograms (1,430 lb) making it larger than any other known "stenonine" other than Equus major. The species is distinguished from other equines by a number of characters of the morphology of the teeth. The metapodial bones of the feet tend to be elongate, with a large diaphysis (midsection) and wide epiphyses (end sections).

== Distribution and chronology ==
Equuss suessenbornensis is known from remains found across Europe, spanning from Britain, France and Spain in the west, eastwards to Italy and Greece, and northwards to Germany and the Czech Republic, with possible remains being known from Moldova. Remains are also known from the Akhalkalaki site in Georgia in the Caucasus. The chronology of the species spans from the mid-Early Pleistocene around 1.5 million years ago, until the early Middle Pleistocene, around 600,000 years ago, around the time of arrival of caballine true horses into Europe, assigned to the species Equus mosbachensis.

== Ecology ==
Equus suessenbornensis is primarily associated with open woodland environments, though it was also found in open environments as well as forested environments. Dental wear analysis suggests that it was primarily a mixed feeder (engaging in both browsing and grazing), though some populations were alternatively found to be primarily browsers or grazers. It often co-occurred with the smaller "stenonine" equine Equus altidens, which dental wear analysis indicates had a more grazing focused diet on average, suggesting dietary niche partitioning between the two species.
