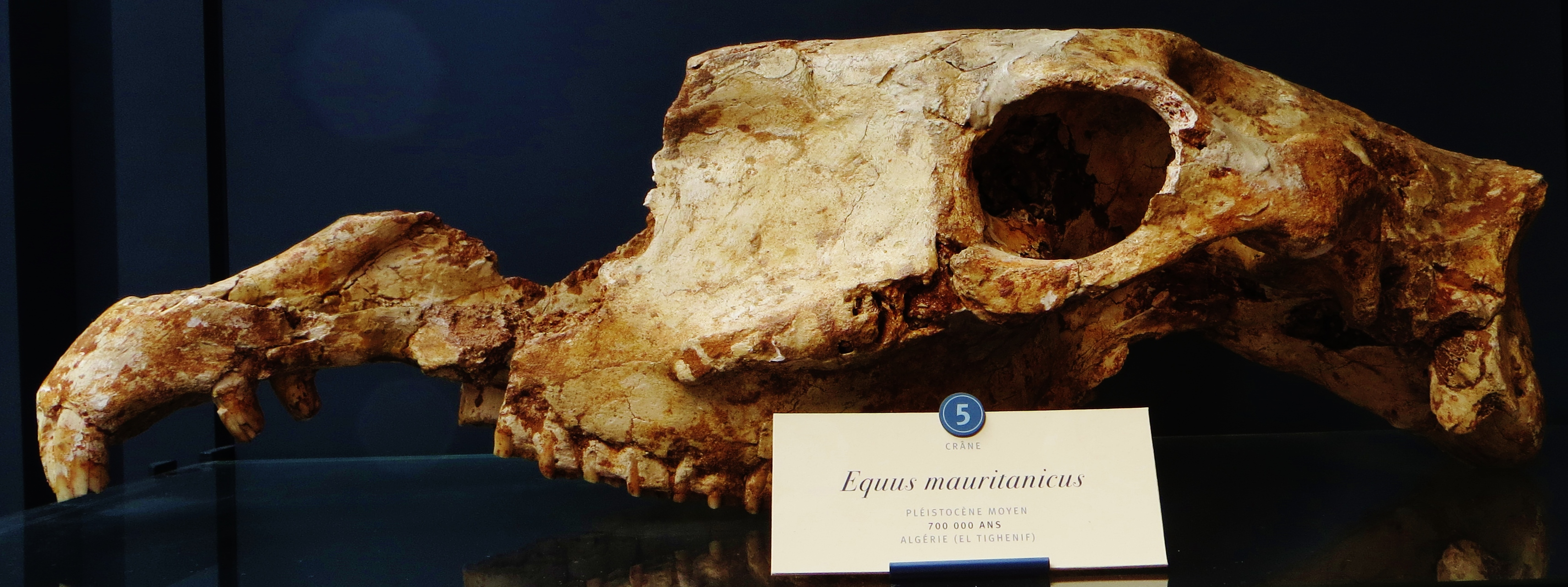

Scientific classification
- Kingdom: Animalia
- Phylum: Chordata
- Class: Mammalia
- Order: Perissodactyla
- Family: Equidae
- Genus: Equus
- Species: †E. mauritanicus

Binomial name
- †Equus mauritanicus (Pomel, 1897)

= Equus mauritanicus =

Equus mauritanicus Temporal range: Late Pleistocene - Holocene

Extinct species of horse

Equus mauritanicus is an extinct species of equine which lived in North Africa during the Pleistocene. It was described by Auguste Pomel based on remains from Tighenif, Algeria, typically assumed to be late Quaternary in age, and to which remains from across North Africa have been attributed. E. mauritanicus has in the past been considered synonymous with the living plains zebra (E. quagga), but examination of several skulls show it to apparently represent a distinct species of zebra that does not represent any living species of African zebra, but the taxon has been described as "poorly defined" and requiring further study. Other authors have placed the range of the species at the end of the Early Pleistocene, around 1 million years ago.
