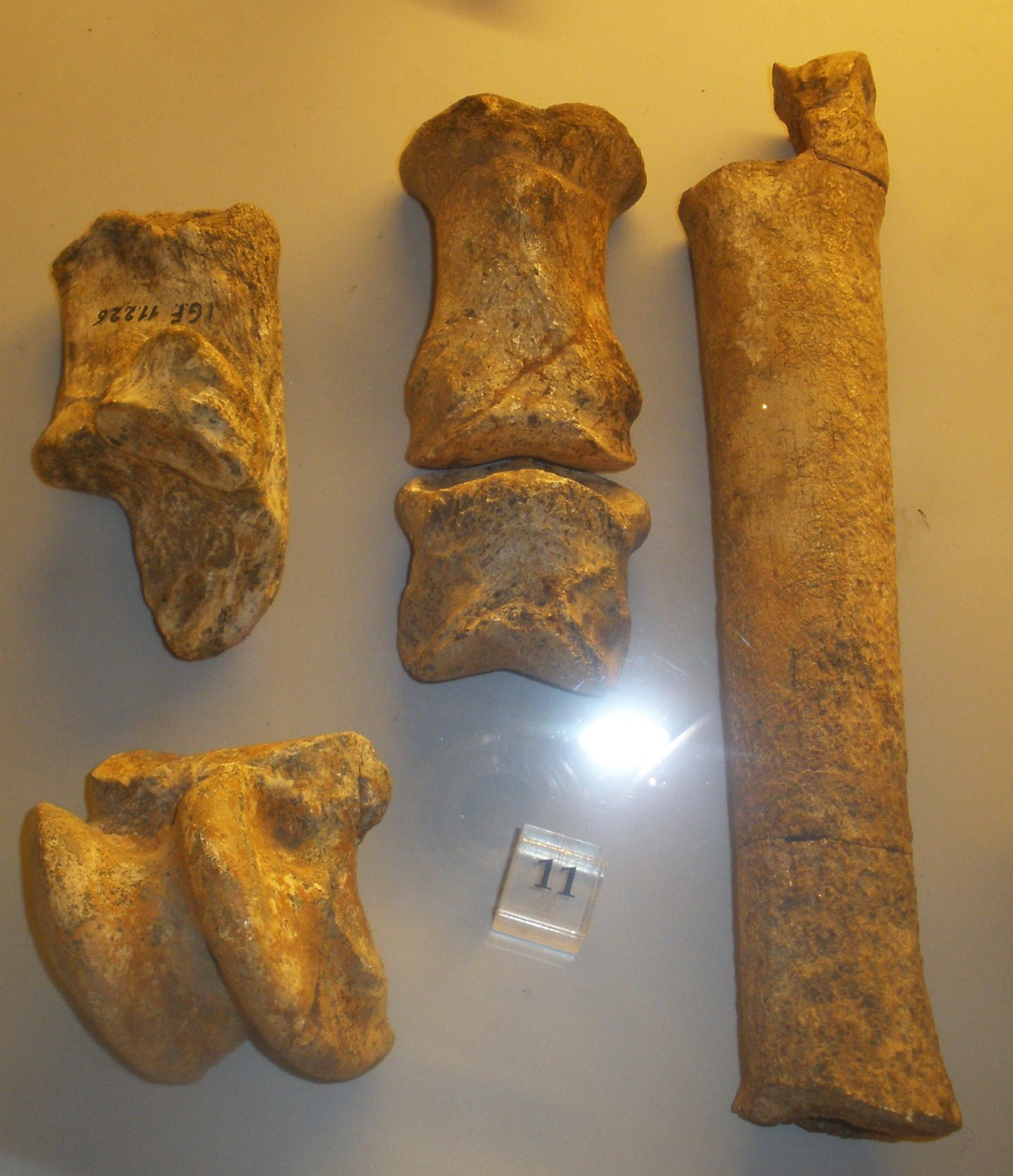
- Fossils of Equus livenzovensis

Scientific classification
- Kingdom: Animalia
- Phylum: Chordata
- Class: Mammalia
- Order: Perissodactyla
- Family: Equidae
- Genus: Equus
- Species: †E. livenzovensis

Binomial name
- †Equus livenzovensis Bajgusheva, 1978

= Equus livenzovensis =

Equus livenzovensis Temporal range: Early Pleistocene 2.6 Ma

Extinct species of horse

Equus livenzovensis is an extinct species of large stenonid horse that lived in Italy around 2.6 million years ago during the early Pleistocene epoch. It was a large species of Equus being larger than E. stenonis and E. stehlini. It is sometimes considered a subspecies of E. stenonis or even an ancestor to it. Either way theses two species are closely related.

This species has limited remains and is only represented by a skull and a few dental remains.
