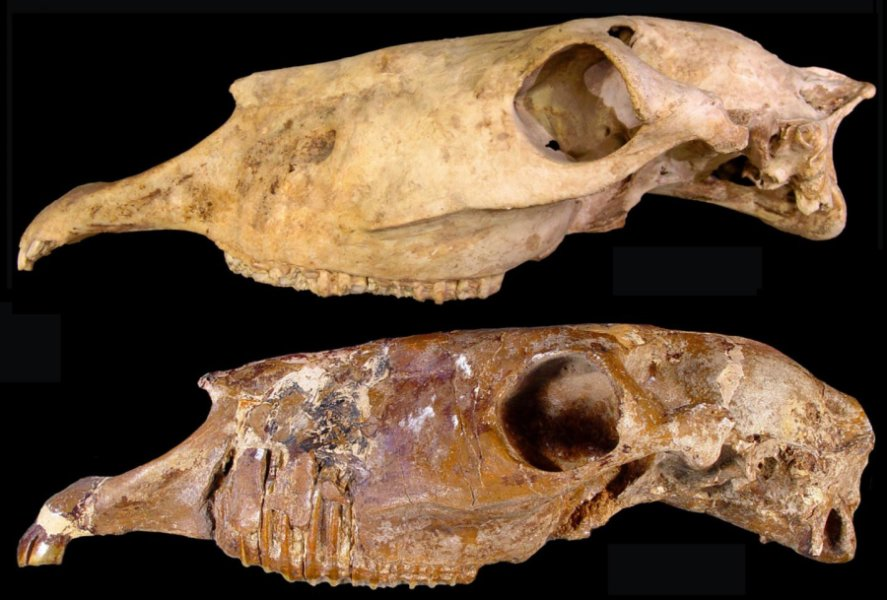

Scientific classification
- Kingdom: Animalia
- Phylum: Chordata
- Class: Mammalia
- Infraclass: Placentalia
- Order: Perissodactyla
- Family: Equidae
- Genus: †Haringtonhippus; Heintzman et al., 2017
- Species: †H. francisci

Binomial name
- †Haringtonhippus francisci Hay, 1915

Synonyms
- Equus francisci Hay, 1915; Equus achates; Equus quinni; Equus cedralensis

= Haringtonhippus =

Haringtonhippus Temporal range: ~3–0.011 Ma Blancan to Rancholabrean

Extinct genus of mammals

Haringtonhippus is an extinct genus of equine from the Pleistocene of North America The genus is monospecific, consisting of the species H. francisci, initially described in 1915 by Oliver Perry Hay as Equus francisci. Members of the genus are often referred to as stilt-legged horses, in reference to their slender distal limb bones, in contrast with those of contemporary "stout legged" caballine true horses.

Haringtonhippus fossils have only been discovered in North America. Specimens have been found from southern Mexico to southern South Dakota and in Alberta, Canada, at sites such as Gypsum Cave and Natural Trap Cave, as well as eastern Beringia in Yukon. A later study found that Equus cedralensis from the Late Pleistocene of Mexico also belonged to this species. The earliest species of the lineage appeared in North America during the Late Pliocene to Early Pleistocene, around 2 to 3 Ma. It became extinct at the end of the Late Pleistocene, around 12,000 years ago as part of the end-Pleistocene extinctions, along with most other large mammals in the Americas.

== Taxonomy ==
Haringtonhippus is named after Charles Richard Harington. It was originally described as a new Equus species, E. francisci, in 1915. Dalquest (1979) considered Equus tau Owen, 1869, described from teeth in Mexico, a senior synonym of E. francisci, while Equus quinni and E. arrelanoi were synonymized with E. francisci by Winans (1989). The species Equus achates Hay and Cook, 1930 (synonymized with E. tau by Dalquest 1979) was synonymized with E. francisci by Hulbert (1995), who also declared E. tau and E. littoralis nomina dubia.

A 2017 paper placed Equus francisci outside of the crown group containing all living member of the genus Equus based on a phylogenetic analysis of DNA sequences, leading to erection of the new genus Haringtonhippus. The genus is phylogenetically closer to Equus than to Hippidion. It is estimated to have diverged from modern Equus around 4.1–5.7 million years ago, during the late Hemphillian or early Blancan.

- Equini
  - †Hippidion
  - - †Haringtonhippus
    - Genus Equus
      - Equus ferus (wild horse)
      - - †Equus ovodovi
        - - Subgenus Asinus (asses)
          - Subgenus Hippotigris (zebras)

Some other authors have argued that the species should be retained in the genus Equus, due to its morphological similarity to members of that genus.

== Description ==
H. francisci was relatively small-sized, with two studies giving estimated body mass ranges of 167 to 251 kilograms (368 to 553 lb) and 175.5–278.4 kilograms (387–614 lb). The third metatarsal (metapodial) bones are slender and similar to those of asses.

== Ecology ==
H. francisci is thought to have had a predominantly grazing based diet, similar to living equines. Dental mesowear analysis of specimens from Natural Trap Cave in Wyoming suggest that the species regularly consumed abrasive vegetation.
