= Equus altidens =

Equus altidens Temporal range: Early Pleistocene–Middle Pleistocene

Scientific classification
- Kingdom: Animalia
- Phylum: Chordata
- Class: Mammalia
- Infraclass: Placentalia
- Order: Perissodactyla
- Family: Equidae
- Genus: Equus
- Species: †E. altidens

Binomial name
- †Equus altidens Von Reichenau, 1915

Extinct species of equine from the Pleistocene

Equus altidens is an extinct species of equine native to western Eurasia including Europe during the Early Pleistocene to early Middle Pleistocene.

== Taxonomy ==
Equus altidens was first described in 1915 from fossilised remains at the early Middle Pleistocene Sussenborn locality in Germany. Most recent authors consider the species Equus marxi also known from Sussenborn to be a junior synonym of E. altidens. The majority of authors have suggested the species is related to other "stenonine" equines known from Early Pleistocene of Europe such as Equus stenonis, which are thought to be more closely related to living zebras and asses than to true horses. Some authors have suggested a closer relationship to asses than to zebras for E. altidens. Some authors have placed the species in the subgenus Sussemionus, or place it with other "stenonines" in the separate genus Allohippus.

"Orce Man", a supposed archaic human fossil from the Early Pleistocene of Spain, was later determined to actually be the skull remains of a juvenile of this species, (though true human presence at the site was later confirmed from other remains).

== Description ==
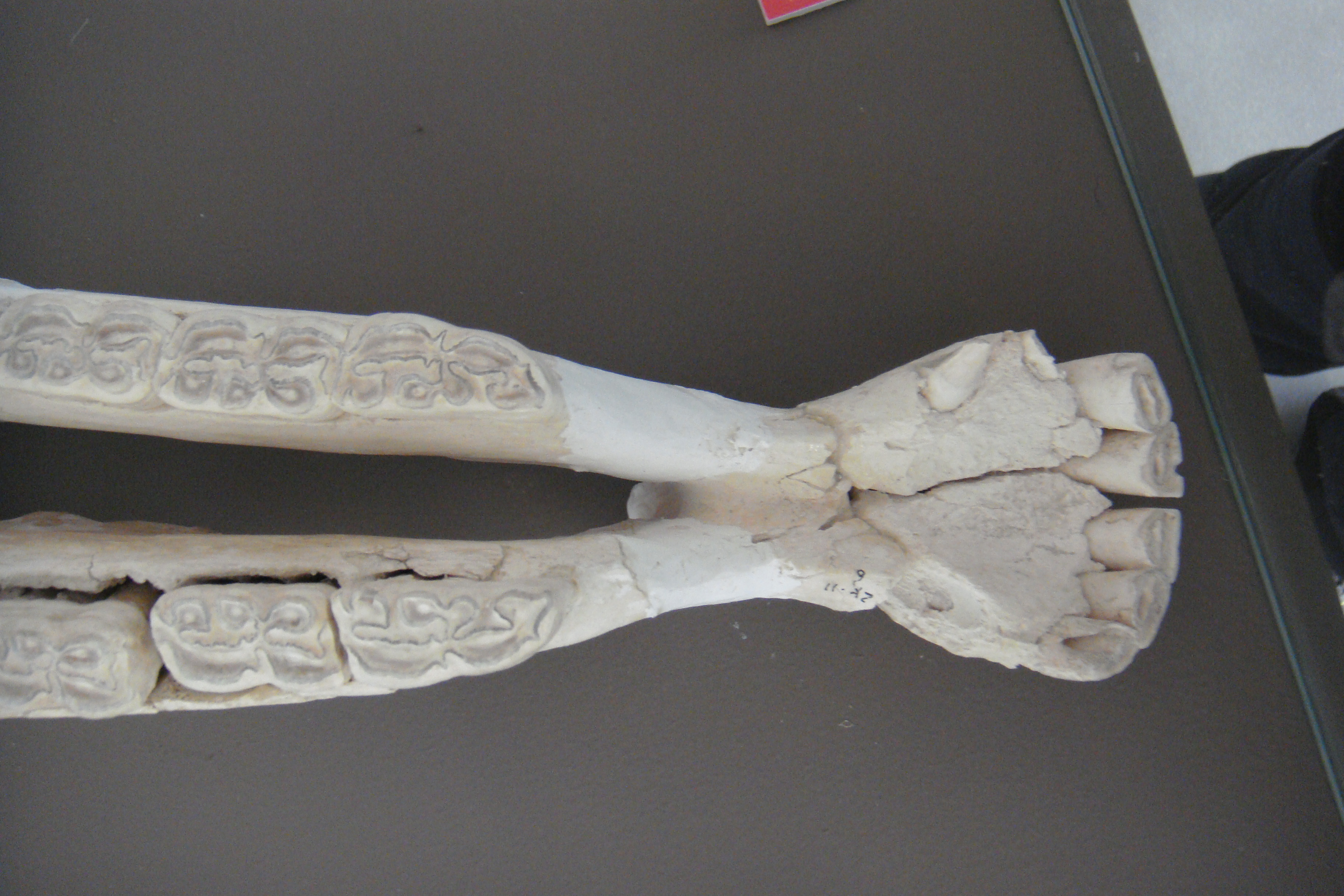
Lower jaw of Equus altidens

Equus altidens is a medium-sized equine species with an estimated body mass of around 338–374 kilograms (745–825 lb).^{ST2} The species had slender limbs, the most slender among the "stenonines", including the metapodial bones, and is distinguished from other equines by a number of dental morphological features, including narrow and small crowns, and deep molar ectoflexid, though the dental morphology exhibits considerable variability in a number of characters.

== Distribution and chronology ==
Equus altidens is known from remains found across Europe, spanning from the Iberian Peninsula to Italy and Greece, northwards to Germany and Britain (Cromer Forest Bed), and as far eastwards as Georgia in the Caucasus. Other possible records are known from Romania, Turkey, Tajikistan, Hungary, and Russia. Authors have differed about the timing of the earliest appearance of the species, ranging from as late as 1.2 million years ago to as early as 1.8 million years ago, with recent research supporting the earlier end of the range, with the earliest records coming from the Dmanisi site in Georgia. The youngest remains of the species date to around 600,000 years ago, when the species like other European "stenonine" equines was replaced by early caballine true horses belonging to the species Equus mosbachensis.

== Ecology ==
Dental wear analysis indicates that Equus altidens had an abrasive, largely grazing based diet, a diet also inferred from its hypsodonty index, though it may have seasonally engaged in mixed feeding. It often co-occurred alongside another larger "stenonine" equine, Equus suessenbornensis. Evidence suggests that this species had a diet that consisted of considerably more browse than E. altidens, suggesting dietary niche partitioning between the two species. Equus altidens is thought to have primarily inhabited arid, open habitats. Isotopic analysis from the Venta Micena locality in southeast Spain dating to the Early Pleistocene, around 1.6 million years ago, suggests that at this locality Equus altidens was regularly preyed upon by sabertooth cats, including the lion sized Homotherium, and the smaller, jaguar sized Megantereon.

== Relationship with humans ==
At the Fuente Nueva-3 site in Spain, during the late Early Pleistocene around 1.2 million years ago, cut marks found on bones indicate butchery of Equus altidens by archaic humans, likely Homo antecessor.
