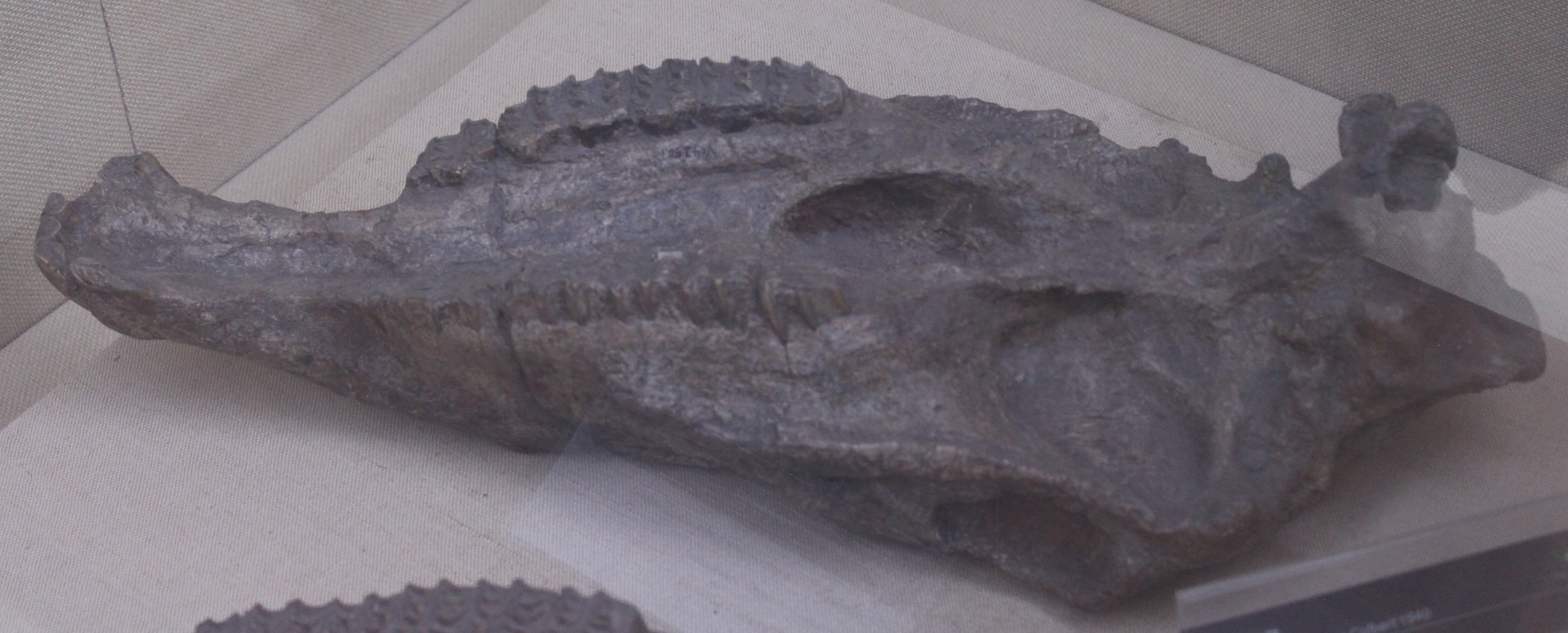
- Holotype skull (IVPP V4250.1), Paleozoological Museum of China

Scientific classification
- Kingdom: Animalia
- Phylum: Chordata
- Class: Mammalia
- Order: Perissodactyla
- Family: Equidae
- Genus: Equus
- Subgenus: incertae sedis
- Species: †E. yunnanensis

Binomial name
- †Equus yunnanensis Colbert (1940)

= Yunnan horse =

Yunnan horse Temporal range: Pleistocene

Extinct species of mammal

The Yunnan horse (Equus yunnanensis) is an extinct species of equine that was present in East Asia during the Pleistocene very likely as a grazer on open tracts of grassland. It was a small equine comparable in size to the modern Przewalski's horse.

It was first described by Edwin H. Colbert from dental fossils collected by Walter W. Granger in the Ma Kai Valley in northern Yunnan ten miles south of the town of Ma kai in Guangnan County as part of the program of the Central Asiatic Expeditions of the American Museum of Natural History in the winter of 1926–1927. They were the most numerous fossils of a single type of animal in the Ma Kai Valley deposits.

Edwin H. Colbert thought it almost identical with an Equus collected by Pierre Teilhard de Chardin in the Upper Irrawaddy sediments of Myanmar: "Indeed, judging by the evidence at hand, these two representations of the genus, one in Burma and one in Yunnan appear to be cospecific".

Authors have considered it a "stenonine horse", probably only distantly related to true horses, and more closely related to zebras and asses.
