= Plesippus =

Scientific classification
- Kingdom: Animalia
- Phylum: Chordata
- Class: Mammalia
- Order: Perissodactyla
- Family: Equidae
- Tribe: Equini
- Genus: †Plesippus; Matthew, 1924

Extinct genus of mammals

Plesippus is a genus of extinct horse from the Pleistocene of North America. Although commonly seen as a subgenus of Equus recent cladistic analysis considers it a distinct genus.

== Species ==
Two species are recognized by Barron et al. (2019), P. simplicidens and P. idahoensis.
