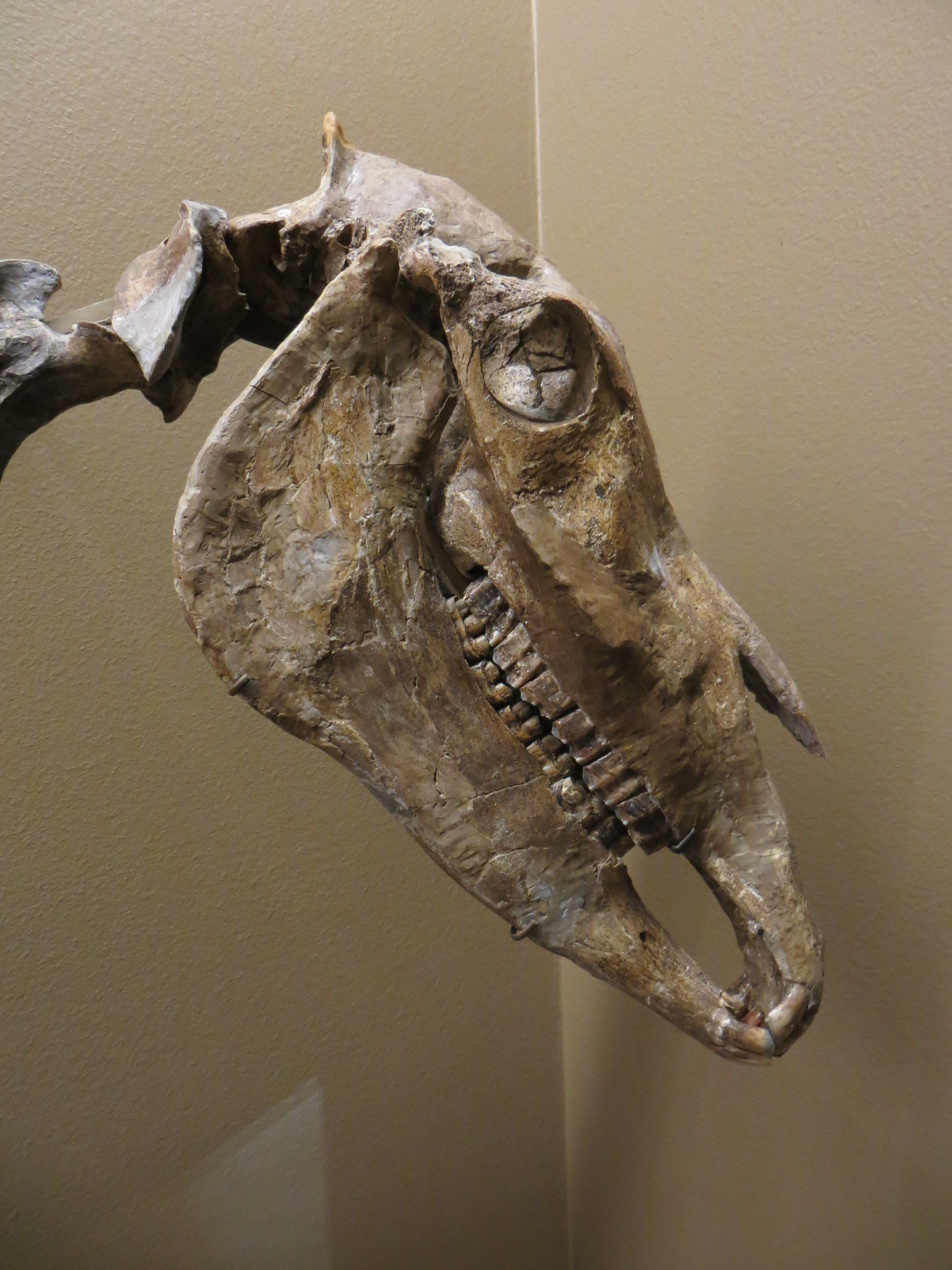

Scientific classification
- Kingdom: Animalia
- Phylum: Chordata
- Class: Mammalia
- Order: Perissodactyla
- Family: Equidae
- Genus: Equus
- Species: †E. stenonis

Binomial name
- †Equus stenonis Cocchi, 1867

= Equus stenonis =

Equus stenonis Temporal range: Early Pleistocene 2.5–1.6 Ma

Extinct species of Early Pleistocene Eurasian equine

Equus stenonis is an extinct species of equine that lived in Western Eurasia including Europe during the Early Pleistocene.

== Taxonomy and evolution ==
The species was first named in 1867, with the type specimen being IGF 560, a skull with a now lost (but preserved as a cast) associated mandible collected from Terranuova Bracciolini in Italy. Several subspecies have been named, including E. stenonis vireti, E. stenonis guthi, E. stenonis pueblensis, E. stenonis olivolanus and E. stenonis stenonis, which likely represent different ecomorphotypes adapted to varying local conditions.

Equus stenonis and other Early Pleistocene Old World Equus species are suggested to be closely related and perhaps descended from the North American species Equus simplicidens (also known as the "Hagerman horse"). The ancestor of Equus stenonis as well as other Early Pleistocene Old World Equus species are thought to have arrived from North America across the Bering Land Bridge as part of the Equus Datum event at the beginning of the Pleistocene, approximately 2.6 million years ago. Equus stenonis is typically considered to be closely related to other Early Pleistocene Eurasian Equus species which are collectively referred to as "stenonines" or "stenonoids". The African species Equus koobiforensis and E. oldowayensis are closely related to E. stenonis. The "stenonines" are generally thought to be the ancestral stock from which both modern zebras and asses emerged. E. stenonis has been proposed to be possibly the direct ancestor of both zebras and asses.

Barron-Ortiz et al. (2019) resurrect the genus Allohippus for Equus stenonis based on the results of their cladistic analysis regarding the interrelationships of the genus Equus, though this was subsequently rejected by other authors.

== Description ==
Populations of Equus stenonis varied considerably in body mass across time and area, varying from as low as 300 kilograms (660 lb), to over 500 kilograms (1,100 lb), making it medium-large sized among equines. As in other species of Equus, the feet are monodactyl (one-toed). The head is large and elongated and has an undulated top profile in side-view, the nasal notch is deeply incised. The braincase is flexed downward and is relatively small. The teeth have a v-shaped linguaflexid separating the metaconid and metastylid, similar to other "stenonines". The limb bones are relatively large and robust. The metapodial bones of the feet are proportionally elongated and robust, with the central digit having a massive morphology, with a large v-shaped muscle scar.

== Distribution and chronology ==
Equus stenonis is known from remains found across Europe, from the Iberian Peninsula to Greece, as well as the Dmanisi site in Georgia, spanning part of the Early Pleistocene, the oldest remains dating to approximately 2.5 million years ago, while the youngest dates are uncertain, ranging from 1.8-1.3 million years ago.

== Palaeoecology ==
Dental wear patterns of the species' teeth from the Coste San Giacomo locality in Italy suggest that E. stenonis was a grazer. It sometimes co-occurred with the larger, mainly browsing stenonine Equus major.

== See also ==
- Equus altidens another "stenonine" equine from the Early-Middle Pleistocene of Europe
- Equus suessenbornensis another "stenonine" equine from the Early-Middle Pleistocene of Europe
