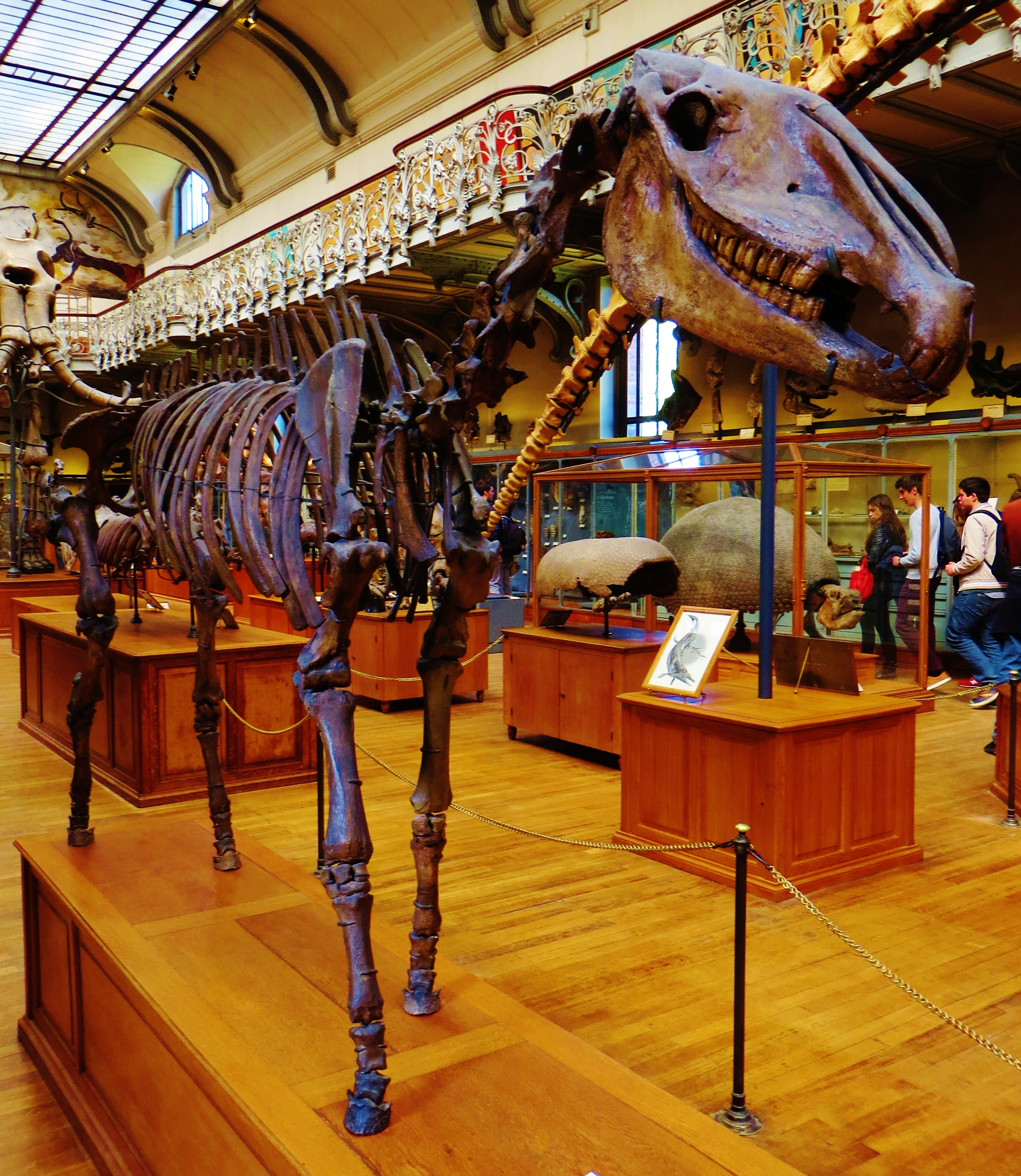
- H. principale skeleton at the Gallery of Paleontology and Comparative Anatomy, Paris.

Scientific classification
- Kingdom: Animalia
- Phylum: Chordata
- Class: Mammalia
- Order: Perissodactyla
- Family: Equidae
- Subfamily: Equinae
- Tribe: Equini
- Genus: †Hippidion; Owen, 1869

Species
- H. principale (Lund, 1846) (type); H. saldiasi Roth, 1899; H. devillei (Gervais, 1855)

Synonyms
- Hipphaplous Ameghino 1882; Hipphaplus Ameghino 1882; Onohippidion Filhol 1888; Onohippidium Moreno 1891; Parahipparion Ameghino 1904

= Hippidion =

Hippidion Temporal range: Late Pliocene-Holocene (Uquian-Lujanian) ~2.5–0.011 Ma

Extinct genus of mammals

Hippidion (meaning "little horse" in Ancient Greek) is an extinct genus of equine that lived in South America from the Late Pliocene to the end of the Late Pleistocene (Lujanian), between 2.5 million and 11,000 years ago. Hippidion arrived in South America along with many other animals of North American origin as part of the Great American Interchange. They were one of two lineages of equines native to South America during the Pleistocene epoch, alongside Equus (Amerhippus) neogeus. Hippidion ranged widely over South America, extending to the far south of Patagonia. Hippidion differs from living equines of the genus Equus in having a long notch separating the nasal bone from the rest of the skull, which may indicate the presence of a prehensile upper lip.

Hippidion became extinct as part of the end-Pleistocene extinction event around 12-11,000 years ago, along with most other large animals native to the Americas. Remains of Hippidion dating to shortly before its extinction have been found with cut marks and associated with human artifacts, such as stone Fishtail points, which may suggest that hunting by recently arrived humans may have been a factor in its extinction.

== Taxonomy ==
=== Evolution ===
Although early ancient DNA analysis studies suggested a close relationship with the wild horse, Equus ferus, this was later shown to be incorrect, with more complete sequences finding Hippidion as an outgroup to all living equines and less closely related to living equines than the North American "New World stilt legged horse", Haringtonhippus francisci. Cladogram shown below:

- Equini
  - †Hippidion
  - - †Haringtonhippus
    - Genus Equus
      - Equus ferus (wild horse)
      - - †Equus ovodovi
        - - Subgenus Asinus (asses)
          - Subgenus Hippotigris (zebras)

Hippidion is part of a distinct lineage of equines belonging to the tribe Equini that are suggested to have diverged from the ancestors of living equines of the genus Equus at least 6 million years ago. The earliest members of the Hippidion lineage are known from the Late Miocene of North America. Hippidion migrated into the South American continent at the Pliocene-Pleistocene transition, around 2.5 million years ago as part of the Great American Biotic Interchange, following the formation of the Isthmus of Panama connecting North and South America during the late Pliocene. with the hippidiform lineage becoming extinct in North America during the Early Pleistocene. It is disputed as to whether Hippidion is an exclusively South American genus or whether remains from North America are attributable to it.

Hippidion is traditionally thought to have 3 species, H. principale, H. saldiasi and H. devillei, however, in a 2015 DNA analysis, the single sampled H. principale specimen was found to be nested with H. saldiasi, while H. devillei was found to be clearly genetically distinct.

== Description ==
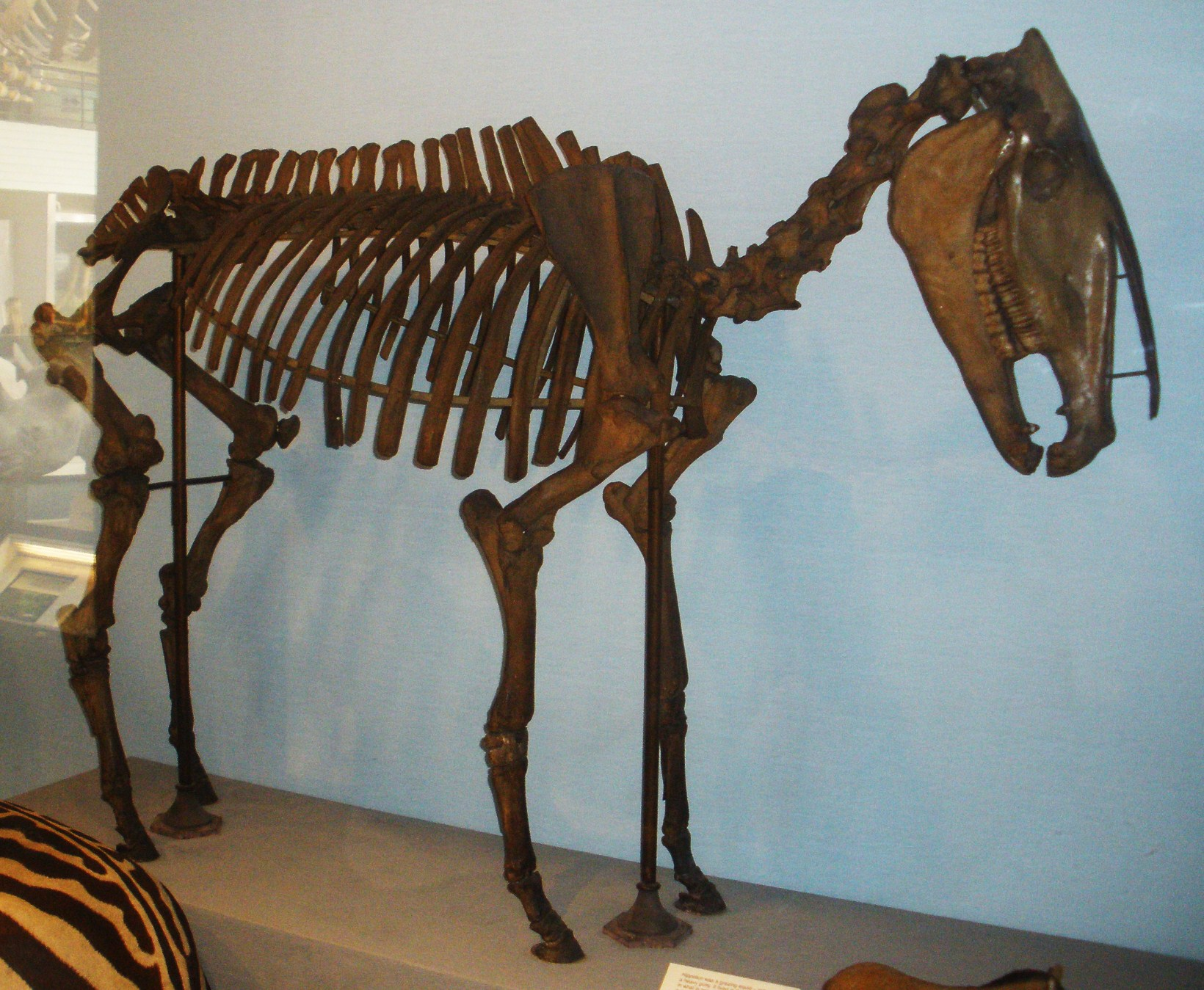
Skeleton in Natural History Museum, London

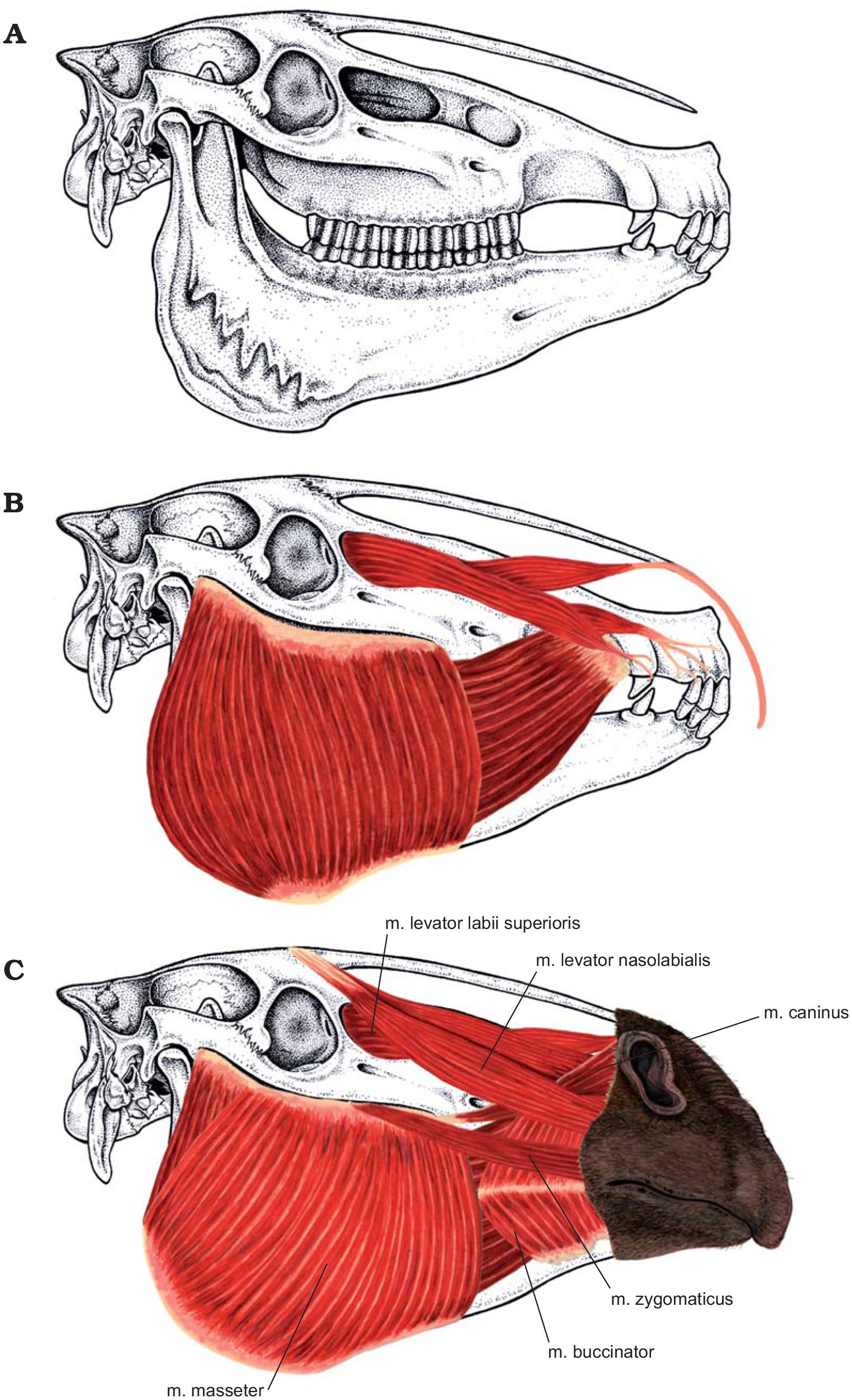
Reconstruction of skull musculature with proposed prehensile lip

Specimens of Hippidion saldiasi have been estimated to weigh in the range of 252.7–326.4 kilograms (557–720 lb), while specimens of H. devillei have been estimated to weigh in the region of 227.3–366.5 kilograms (501–808 lb). H. principale was somewhat larger, with an estimated mass range of 252.7–468.6 kilograms (557–1,033 lb). The skull of Hippidion is noted for its very long nasal notch separating the elongate nasal bone from the rest of the skull. This structure is suggested to correspond to the presence of a prehensile upper lip. The teeth morphology is more similar to that of Pliohippus than to Equus. The limb bones are short and stocky (robust).

== Distribution ==
Fossils of Hippidion have been found across South America. Hippidion principale is primarily known from the Pampas grasslands of Argentina, but its range may have extended to Peru and Ecuador. Hippidion devillei is also known from Argentinian Pampas, but is also found in the Peruvian central Andes, with remains possibly found in Venezuela. Hippidion saldiasi was native to the Southern Cone, including Patagonia and the southern Andes.

== Paleobiology ==
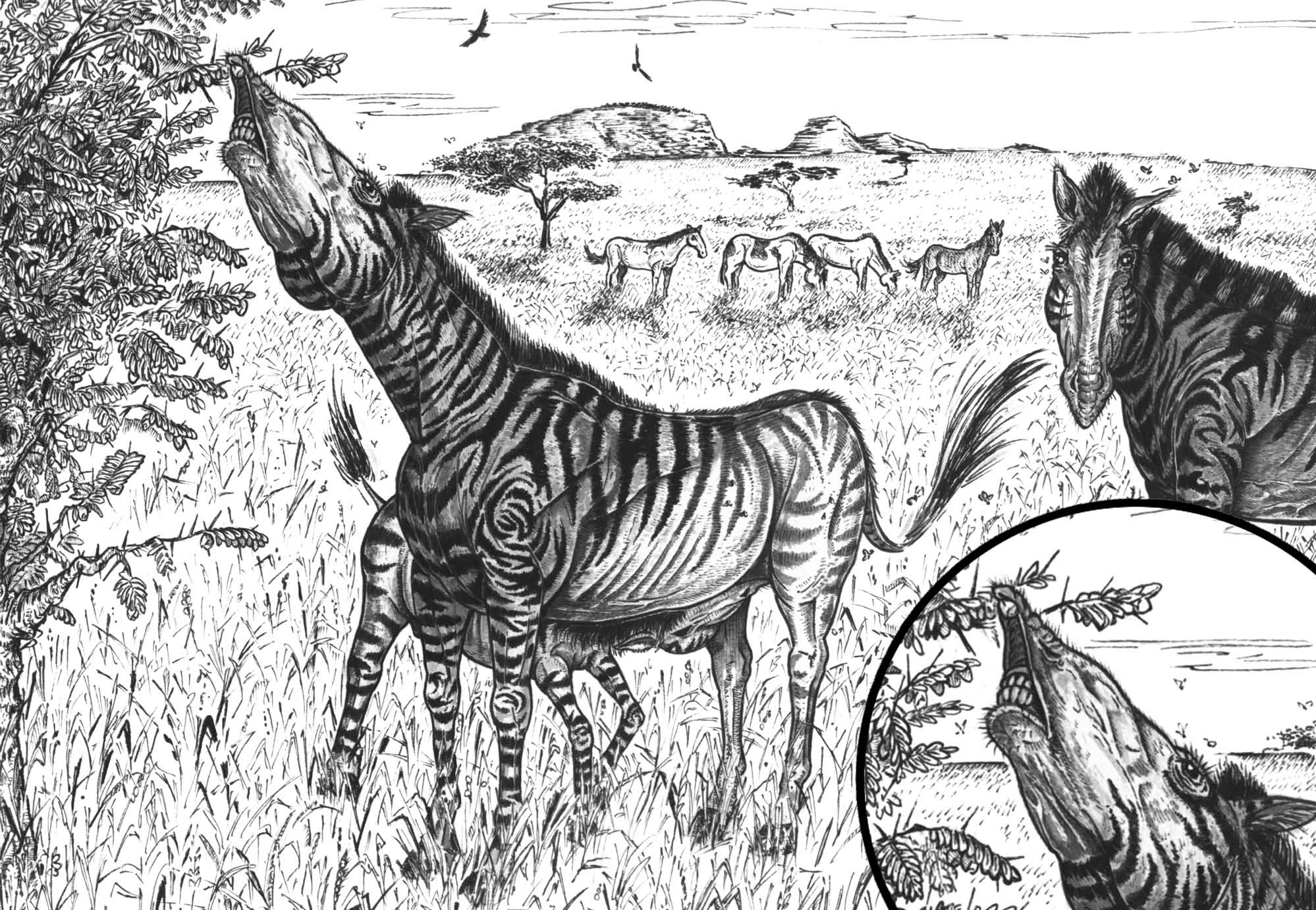
Restoration of a Hippidion browsing with prehensile lips.

Isotopic evidence from δ^{13}C suggests that Hippidion consumed plants of either C_{3} or mixed C_{3} and C_{4} type carbon fixation. The δ^{13}C values are consistent with the occupation of woodland and wooded grassland habitats. H. principale is suggested to have been a mixed feeder (both browsing and grazing), as opposed to the grazing diet of the contemporary Equus neogeus. Hippidion has been suggested to have probably lived in herds like living equines.

In the Pampas, Hippidion lived alongside other megafauna species, including the large elephant-sized ground sloths Megatherium americanum and Lestodon, along with the smaller (but still large) ground sloths Mylodon, Glossotherium, and Scelidotherium, the glyptodonts (very large armadillos with fused round carapaces covering the body) Glyptodon, Doedicurus, and Panochthus, the large camel-like ungulate Macrauchenia and rhinoceros-like Toxodon, the gomphothere (elephant-relative) Notiomastodon, the fellow equine Equus neogeus, the large short-faced bear Arctotherium, and the large sabertooth cat Smilodon.

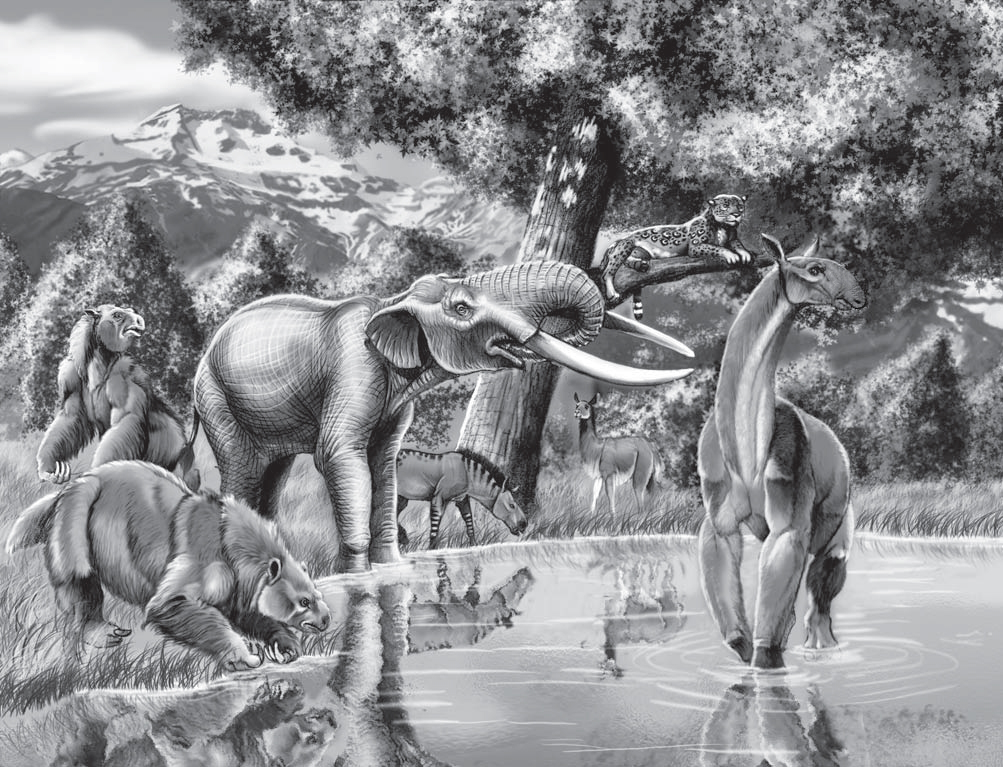
Landscape of Pleistocene mammals found in Chile including Hippidon, as well as the ground sloths Megatherium medinae and Glossotherium, the elephant-like gomphothere Notiomastodon, the llama Palaeolama, the long-necked ungulate Macrauchenia and the jaguar

== Relationship with humans and extinction ==
Hippidion became extinct alongside the other South American equines at the end of the Late Pleistocene, between 12,000 and 10,000 years Before Present (BP) as part of the Late Pleistocene megafauna extinctions, which resulted in the extinction of most large animals in both North and South America. Climatic modelling suggests that the preferred habitat for species of Hippidion declined after the Holocene transition, but the decline is not enough to explain the extinction. At the Arroyo Seco 2 site in the Argentinian Pampas (14,782–11,142 cal yr BP), and Piedra Museo site in Santa Cruz Province, Patagonia (two separate layers dating to 12,463–10,457 cal yr BP and 15,517–12,352 cal yr BP), as well as the similarly aged Cueva del Medio site in southern Chile remains of Hippidion are associated with human artifacts, including Fishtail projectile points, and bear cut marks, indicating that they were hunted by recently arrived humans, which may have played a role in their extinction.
