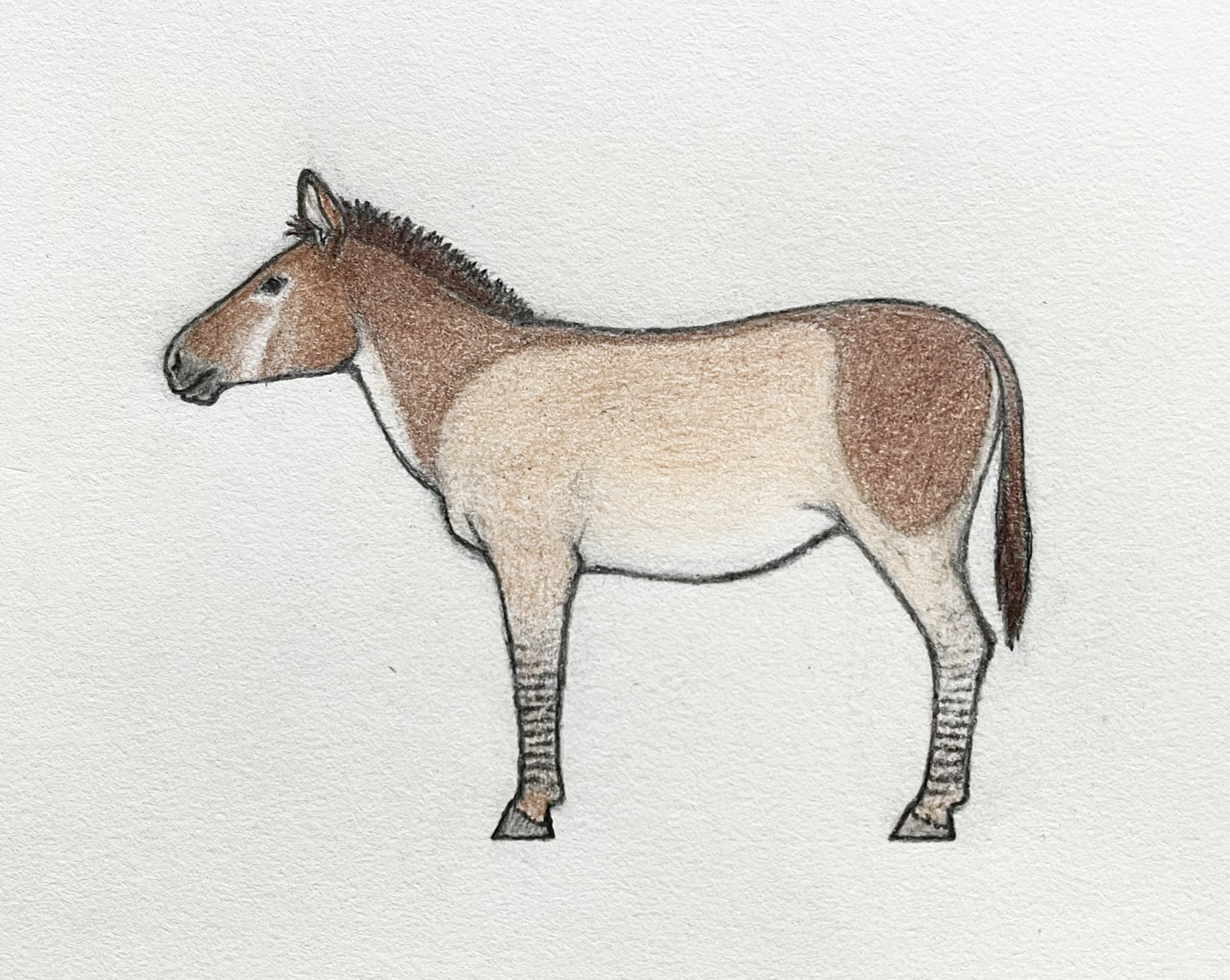
- Restoration of Equus ovodovi

Scientific classification
- Kingdom: Animalia
- Phylum: Chordata
- Class: Mammalia
- Order: Perissodactyla
- Family: Equidae
- Genus: Equus
- Species: †E. ovodovi

Binomial name
- †Equus ovodovi Eisenmann and Vasiliev, 2011

= Equus ovodovi =

Equus ovodovi Temporal range: Middle Pleistocene–Holocene

Extinct species of mammal

Equus ovodovi is an extinct species of equine known from the late Middle Pleistocene to the mid-late Holocene of North and East Asia.

== Description ==
Equus ovodovi was slightly larger than the Asiatic wild ass, with one individual from Proskurjakov cave having an estimated body mass of around 196.5 kilograms (433 lb). E. ovodovi can be distinguished from wild asses based on its larger and more robust limb bones. The skull differs from that of the European wild ass (Equus hydruntinus), with which they were previously confused, by having a narrower supra-occipital crest, and having less broad choanae. Their teeth also differ from those of European wild ass by having more elongate protocones.

== Ecology ==
Isotopic analysis of specimens from the Holocene of China suggests a preference for C_{4} plants.

== Evolution and extinction ==
Equus ovodovi has been suggested to be the last surviving member of the subgenus Sussemionus, which first appeared in North America over 2 million years ago, and was formerly present across Afro-Eurasia. Some later studies questioned its relationship to the subgenus Sussemionus.

Genetic evidence suggests that it was more closely related to zebras and asses than to horses. Initial genetic analysis based on the mitochondrial DNA found the exact relationship to be uncertain, but analysis of the full nuclear genome suggests that zebras and asses are more closely related to each other than either are to E. ovodovi, with the ancestor of E. ovodovi estimated to have diverged from the common ancestor of zebras and asses around 2.5 million years ago, though there had been gene flow into the Equus ovodovi lineage from both the last common ancestor of zebras and asses and the last common ancestor of zebras, as well as gene flow from the Equus ovodovi lineage into the last common ancestor of asses.

Cladogram after Cai et al. 2022:

- Equus
  - Equus ferus (wild horse)
  - - †Equus ovodovi
    - - Subgenus Asinus (asses)
      - Subgenus Hippotigris (zebras)

The earliest remains of the species are known from the vicinity of Novosibirsk in southern Siberia, dating to Marine Isotope Stages 8-7, around 300-200,000 years ago. Remains are known spanning from southern Western Siberia to Northern China. The species went extinct in Siberia at the end of the Late Pleistocene, around 15-11,000 years ago, with the youngest remains dating to around 3900 and 3400 years ago (~1900 and 1400 BC) in Mongolia and Northern China, respectively. Its genetic diversity progressively declined to very low levels over the course of the Late Pleistocene and Holocene prior to its extinction.
