= American Horse (disambiguation) =

American Horse may refer to:

== People ==
- American Horse (elder) (1830–1876), Lakota chieftain and uncle to American Horse the younger
- American Horse (1840–1908), chief of the Oglala Lakota, son of Sitting Bear and son-in-law of Red Cloud
- American Horse (Cheyenne) or Ve'ho'evo'ha ("He-Has-A-White-Man's-Horse"), chief of the Northern Suhtai band of the Northern Cheyenne and part of the Council of Forty-four, prominent warrior in the Battle of the Little Big Horn

== Animals ==
- Extinct horse species from North America, such as Equus scotti, Equus conversidens and Equus lambei
- Mustang, modern-day free-ranging horses descended from domestic stock of European explorers and colonists

== Other uses ==
- American Horse Creek, a stream in South Dakota
- "American Horse", a song from the album Sonic Temple by The Cult
