= William Cloud =

William Cloud may refer to:

- William F. Cloud, officer in the Union Army
- William Horn Cloud, Native American musician
