= Boyd Cave =

Lava tube in Deschutes County, Oregon, US

- Interactive map of Boyd Cave
- Location: Deschutes County, Oregon
- Coordinates: 43°56′32″N 121°11′54″W
- Length: 1,880 feet
- Entrances: 1
- Difficulty: Easy
- Access: Year-round

Boyd Cave is a lava tube within Deschutes County, Oregon, of the United States. The cave is within Deschutes National Forest and is located on the northern flank of Newberry Volcano near the city of Bend.

== Geology ==
Boyd Cave is between 75,000 and 400,000 years old. Similar to Skeleton Cave, it is a well preserved lava tube with little interior collapse and exhibits pahoehoe flow structures on its walls, ceiling and floors. Unlike Skeleton Cave, the roof of Boyd Cave is very thin at less than 3 feet thick in some places. The cave is entered via a stairway through a 10 foot diameter skylight. The cave is mostly walking passage except for a small 10 foot long hand-and-knees crawl about two thirds of the way into the cave.

Boyd Cave is a part of the same lava flow as Skeleton Cave and trends toward Skeleton's Bear Passage.

== History ==
The cave is one of several caves off China Hat road. The cave was originally known to cavers of the region as Coyote Butte Cave after the nearby cinder cone. It received its official name from a former Brooks-Scanlon Lumber Company employee who reportedly discovered it in the late 1920s. The Forest Service certified the name around 1970. The original stairway was wooden and built in 1969 and replaced with steel in the 1970s. Today, Wanderlust Tours is the only company permitted to lead tours through Boyd Cave.
