= Skeleton Cave =

Skeleton Cave may refer to:

- Skeleton Cave (Arizona), U.S.
- Skeleton Cave (Oregon), U.S.
- Skeleton Cave (New South Wales), Australia
