= Prosthennops =

Scientific classification
- Kingdom: Animalia
- Phylum: Chordata
- Class: Mammalia
- Order: Artiodactyla
- Family: Tayassuidae
- Genus: †Prosthennops; Matthew and Gidley, 1904

Extinct genus of pig-like mammals

Prosthennops is a genus of extinct peccaries that lived in North and Central America between the middle Miocene and lower Pliocene (around 15-5 million years ago).

== Description ==
This animal was very similar to present-day peccaries, both in appearance and size. Prosthennops had a shoulder height of about 76 cm. Individuals in the northern part of its range were larger than those in southern Central America.

It possessed a robust skull, with a depressed and elongated snout (but to a lesser extent than other extinct peccaries such as Mylohyus). The orbits were set back on the skull, above the glenoid cavity. The malar/zygomatic bones were prominent like those of African warthogs, developing laterally in massive tubercles.The premaxillary bones were well-developed and bore only two pairs of incisors, of which the second pair was often vestigial.

The fangs were pointed downwards, rather than forwards as in modern boars. The highly developed canines had an elliptical cross-section. The molarisation of the premolars was already very advanced: the second and third premolars were short, with an almost circular outline. The molars were low crowned (brachydonts), covered with a thick layer of enamel and with very simple tubercles.

== Range ==
Fossil finds date to the North American land mammal ages Late Clarendonian and Hemphillian, falling within the Late Miocene. Prosthennops is known from the United States, Mexico, Honduras and Costa Rica. In the Curré Formation in the Costa Rican province of Puntarenas, part of the right mandible, molars, parts of the canines and incisors, and a phalanx have been found to be 5.8 million years old. Prosthennops is found in a 12-million-year-old stratum of the lagerstätten Ashfall Fossil Beds, predating the ash layer.

== Ecology ==
Prosthennops co-occurred with other peccaries such as Platygonus and Protherohyus. It was an omnivore, feeding on plants, nuts, roots and small animals.

Prosthennops is a typical member of the taiassuids, widespread in North America during the Miocene. It appears to have been a relatively specialised form, perhaps along the same evolutionary line that later led to the appearance of elongated snouted peccary forms such as Mylohyus.

== Etymology ==
Ancient Greek σθένος (sthénos, “strength”) — referring to the skull.

== Taxonomy ==
The genus Prosthennops was established by Matthew and Gidley in 1904; the type species, Prosthennops serus, had previously been described by Edward Drinker Cope as Dicotyles serus. A number of species, including P. condoni, P. kernensis, P. niobrarensis, P. rex, P. xiphodonticus, P. ziegleri, and P. haroldcooki, have been ascribed to the genus Prosthennops in much of the western United States (but also in Alabama and Mexico). Some of these species, such as P. niobrarensis and P. xiphodonticus, are clearly more derived than the others and indeed resemble today's taiassuids; they are therefore not ascribable to the genus Prosthennops. Donald Prothero asserts that the genus has historically been a wastebasket taxon.

Prosthennops contains the following species:

- Prosthennops condoni
- Prosthennops haroldcooki
- Prosthennops kernensis
- Prosthennops niobrarensis
- Prosthennops rex
- Prosthennops serus
- Prosthennops xiphodonticus
- Prosthennops ziegleri

== Misidentification ==
The species P. haroldcooki has been at the centre of a curious case of misattribution: the teeth on which the species is based were described in 1922 by Henry Fairfield Osborn, who attributed them to an anthropoid primate, the first known in North America. It was then Edwin Colbert, in 1935, who recognised in these teeth a typical representative of the taiassuids, and thus re-attributed the fossils to the genus Prosthennops.

== Bibliography ==
- E. D. Cope. 1877. Descriptions of New Vertebrata from the Upper Tertiary Formations of the West. Proceedings of the American Philosophical Society 17:219-231
- J.W. Gidley. On Two Species of Platygonus from the Pliocene of Texas. Bulletin of the American Museum of Natural History, Vol. XIX, July 24, 1903, pp. 477–481.
- W. D. Matthew and J.W. Gidley. 1904. New or little known mammals from the Miocene of South Dakota: American Museum expedition of 1903. Bulletin of the American Museum of Natural History 20(22):241-268
- H. F. Osborn. 1922. Hesperopithecus, the first anthropoid primate found in America. American Museum Novitates 37:1-5
- E. H. Barbour. 1925. Prosthennops xiphodonticus, sp. nov. a new fossil peccary from Nebraska. Bulletin of the Nebraska State Museum 1(3):25-32
- E. H. Colbert. 1935. A New Fossil Peccary, Prosthennops niobrarensis, From Brown County, Nebraska. Bulletin of the Nebraska State Museum 1(44):419-430
- D. B. Wright. 1998. Tayassuidae. In C. M. Janis, K. M. Scott, and L. L. Jacobs (eds.), Evolution of Tertiary mammals of North America 389–401
