= List of Ice Age species preserved as permafrost mummies =

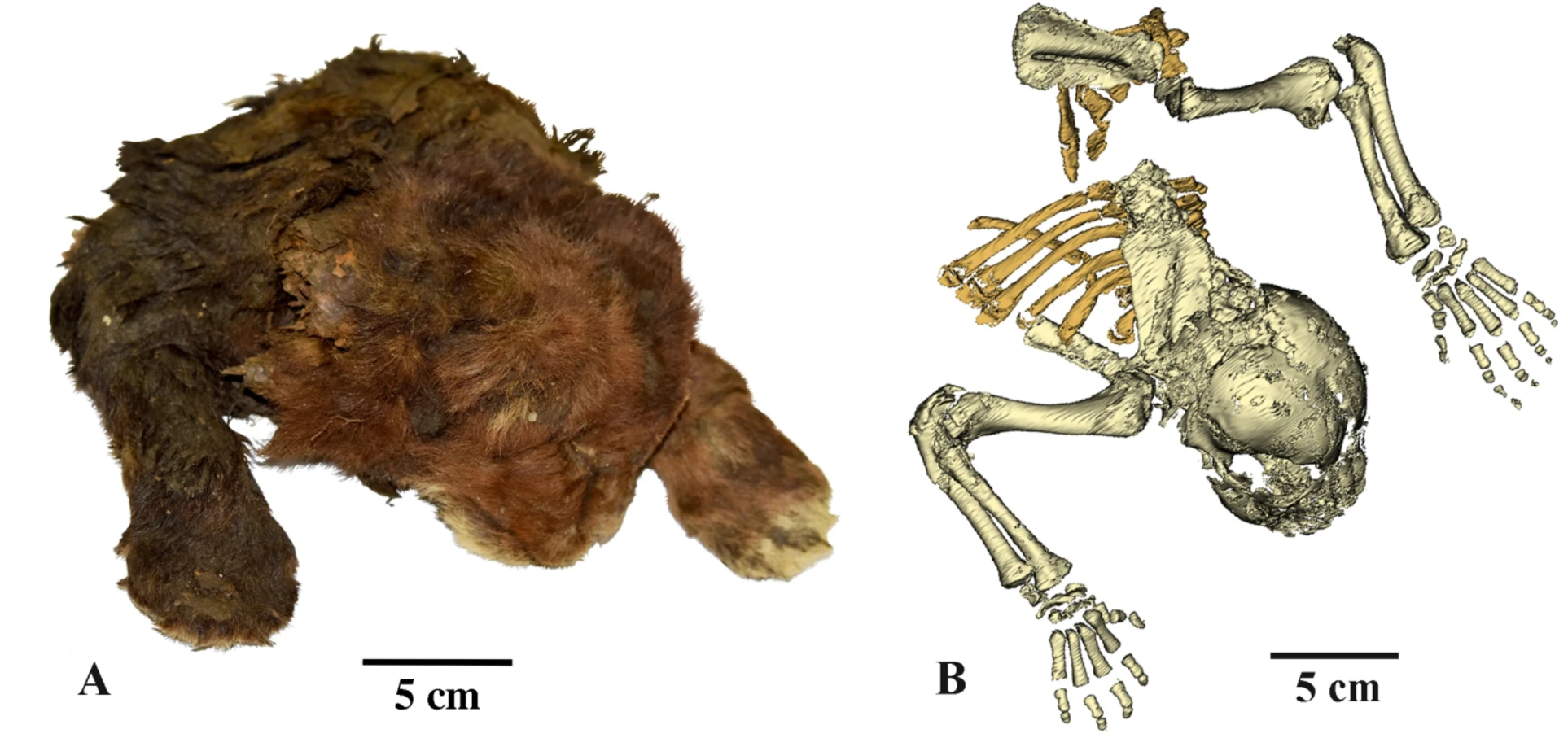
Ca. 37,000-year-old cub of Homotherium latidens found near the Badyarikha River, Siberia.

This is a list of Ice Age species preserved as permafrost mummies during the Late Pleistocene. It includes all known species that have had their tissues partially preserved within the permafrost layer of the Arctic and Subarctic. Most went extinct during the Late Pleistocene extinctions while some are still extant today. They have been listed to the most specific known taxonomic rank.

== Overview ==
Permafrost mummies provide crucial insights into the physiology and life histories of Pleistocene organisms, due to how well the preservation process keeps the specimens from decomposing. The constant presence of permafrost is able to preserve the soft tissues of organisms through a process similar to freeze-drying. With such complete preservation of tissues, it is possible to determine numerous things from the such as: DNA, eDNA, evolutionary history, gut contents, and trophic dynamics. Studies have even shown that the process is so complete there is evidence of nucleic activity.

Some of these specimens are on display at the Kingdom of the Permafrost museum near Yakutsk.

(E) - denote an extinct species or subspecies

== Artiodactyla (Even-toed ungulates) ==
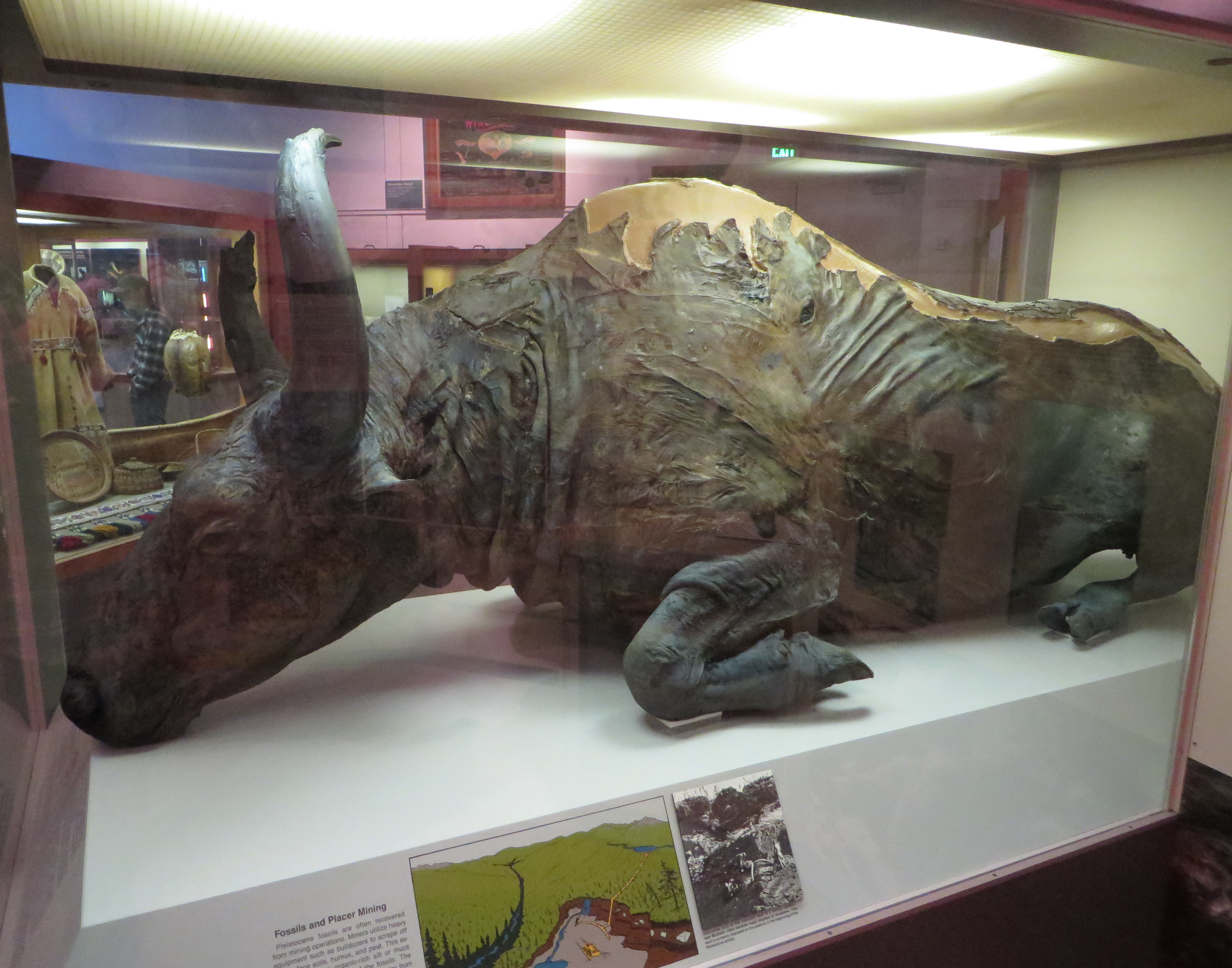
"Blue Babe", 36,000-year-old mummy of a male steppe bison from Fairbanks, Alaska.

=== Bovidae (Bovines) ===
- Bison priscus, Steppe bison (E)
- Bootherium bombifrons, Helmeted muskox (E)
- Ovibos moschatus, Muskox

=== Cervidae (Deer) ===
- Cervalces latifrons, Giant Moose (E)
- Rangifer tarandus, Reindeer

== Carnivora ==
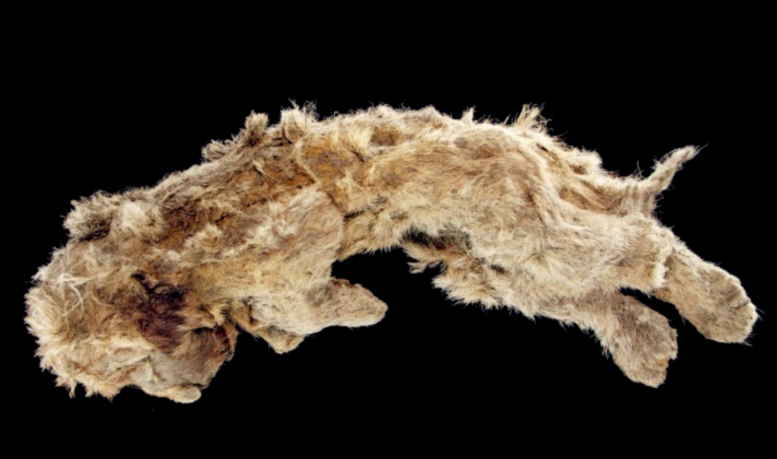
"Sparta", a 28,000 year old mummified female cave lion cub from the banks of the Semyuelyakh River in Siberia.

=== Canidae (Dogs) ===
- Canis lupus, Grey wolf

=== Felidae (Cats) ===
- Homotherium latidens, Scimitar-toothed cat (E)
- Lynx sp.
- Panthera spelaea, Cave lion (E)

=== Mustelidae (Weasels) ===
- Mustela nigripes, Black-footed ferret
- Gulo gulo, Wolverine (first attributed to the putative extinct subspecies G. g. berelekhii, which is probably a junior synonym of the extant subspecies G. g. jacutensis)

== Lagomorpha ==
=== Ochotonidae (Pika) ===
- Ochotona collaris, Collared pika
- Ochotona princeps, American pika

=== Leporidae (Rabbits and hares) ===
- Lepus americanus, Snowshoe hare
- Lepus timidus tanaiticus, Don hare (E)

== Perissodactyla (Odd-toed ungulates) ==
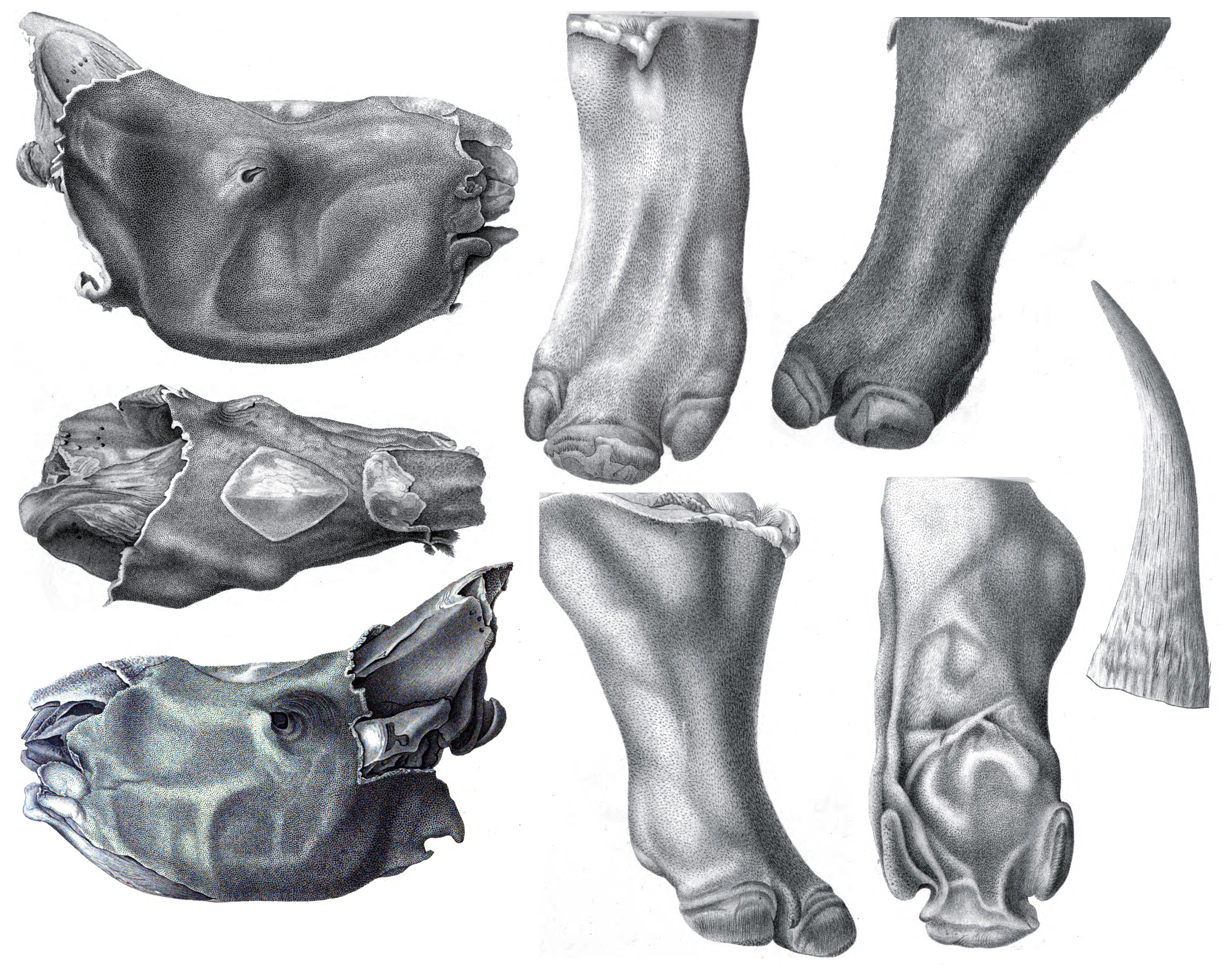
Mummified remains of a woolly rhinoceros found in the Vilyuy River, Siberia in 1771.

=== Equidae (Horses) ===
- Equus lambei, Yukon horse (E)
- Equus lenensis, Lena horse (E)

=== Rhinocerotidae (Rhinoceroses) ===
- Coelodonta antiquitatis, Wooly rhinoceros (E)

== Proboscidea ==
=== Elephantidae (Elephants) ===
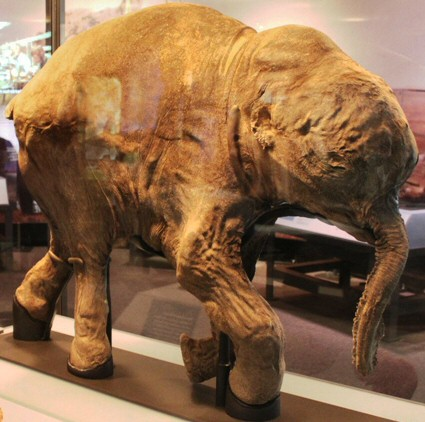
"Lyuba", a 42,000-year-old mammoth calf found in the Yamal Peninsula of Siberia.

- Mammuthus primigenius, Wooly mammoth (E)

== Rodentia (Rodents) ==
=== Cricetidae (Voles) ===
- Lemmus sibiricus, West Siberian lemming
- Microtus gregalis egorovi, Egorov's narrow-headed vole

=== Sciuridae (Squirrels) ===
- Urocitellus parryii, Arctic ground squirrel

=== New World Porcupine (North American Porcupines) ===
- Erethizon dorsatum, North American porcupine

== Passeriformes (Perching Birds) ==
=== Alaudidae (Larks) ===
- Eremophila sp. Ancestral horned lark (E)
