= Joseph Horn Cloud =

- Born: 1873
- Died: September 18, 1920 (aged 46–47); South Dakota, U.S.
- Children: 2, including William Horn Cloud
- Relatives: Dewey Beard (half-brother)

Joseph Horn Cloud (1873 - September 18, 1920) was a survivor of the Wounded Knee Massacre.

== Life ==
Joseph came to the Pine Ridge Indian Reservation circa 1890, as part of the Miniconjou band led by Spotted Elk (“Big Foot”). There, he worked as an interpreter for U.S. soldiers until the Wounded Knee Massacre, during which his father, Horn Cloud, mother, Nest, two brothers (William Horn Cloud (b. 1876), and Sherman Horn Cloud (b. 1865)) and a niece were killed. In addition to Joseph, his brother Daniel and half brother Dewey Beard survived. In the early 1900s, American journalist Eli S. Ricker began research for a book he was going to call "The Final Conflict between the Red Men and the Palefaces." He gathered sources and interviews about conditions and battles on the Plains during the last half of the 1800s. He recorded the interviews in small note pads known to historians as the "Ricker Tablets.” In one such interview, Joseph told Ricker what he witnessed at the Wounded Knee Massacre, "When the shooting began the women ran to the ravine. The shooting was in every direction. Soldiers shot into one another.... Many of the Indians in the circle were killed. Many of them mingled with the soldiers behind them, picking up guns from dead soldiers and taking cartridge belts."

Shortly after the loss of much of his family, Joseph assumed his father's name 'Horn Cloud' as his surname. He assumed the name while living at Holy Rosary Mission (now Red Cloud Indian School), Pine Ridge, where he converted to Catholicism. Joseph worked as a day laborer and cowboy, and learned carpentry. He became disabled after being trampled by cattle, preventing him from continuing to do physical labor. Upon returning to Pine Ridge, he worked as a mediator between Oglala residents and Catholic priests. He was a consistent attendee of the Catholic Sioux Congress. He eventually worked as a translator and became secretary of the Oglala Tribal Council.

In 1902, he married Mary Bald Eagle Bear, with whom he had two daughters. Mary and both children died during the 1918 influenza pandemic. After marrying, he became a catechist in the Medicine Root district, continuing with that work until his death.

Horn Cloud died on September 18, 1920 at American Horse Creek from illness. He was buried in Medicine Root Cemetery.

== Activism ==
While at the mission school, Joseph had learned enough English to begin seeking compensation in the mid-1890s and lead a survivors' campaign for losses during 1890–1891. Legally, claimants could not demand retribution for their dead relatives, which was limited by the 1891 act, so claimants could only seek compensation for stolen or damaged property. Both Joseph and his brother Dewey made property loss claims and sought restitution for their father's stolen property in the combined amount of approximately $4,526.50, which was during the time frame into the earliest part of the 1900s. Joseph with his spouse Mildred Beautiful Bald Eagle had two children, their daughter Jessie and William Horn Cloud.

Joseph was instrumental for interviews and accounts, speaking out against prejudice as well as leading compensation claims regarding Wounded Knee since he knew enough of the English language. He was an early vital member and a founder of the Wounded Knee Survivors Association founded in 1901 which continues today. Joseph and his brother Dewey Beard raised enough money for a monument that was erected near the mass grave in 1905.
