= Equus niobrarensis =

Equus niobrarensis Temporal range: Late Pleistocene

Scientific classification
- Kingdom: Animalia
- Phylum: Chordata
- Class: Mammalia
- Order: Perissodactyla
- Family: Equidae
- Genus: Equus
- Subgenus: incertae sedis
- Species: †E. niobrarensis

Binomial name
- †Equus niobrarensis Hay 1913

Subspecies
- Equus niobrarensis alaskae Winans; Equus niobrarensis niobrarensis

Synonyms
- †Equus scotti

Extinct species of mammal

Equus niobrarensis (or commonly, Niobrara horse) is an extinct species of Equus, the genus that includes the horse. E. niobrarensis may be synonymous with Equus scotti. It was "stout-legged" and belonged to the "big horses" category as defined by M. C. Winans. The skull of the horse was noted as being broader than Equus caballus.

== Distribution ==
E. niobrarensis was native to North America and commonly found in western North America and dates to the late Pleistocene. Fossils of E. niobrarensis were discovered at Dry Cave in New Mexico. Another mention of an E. niobrarensis discovery was in Skeleton Cave, Oregon.
