= Skeleton Cave (Oregon) =

Cave in Oregon, United States

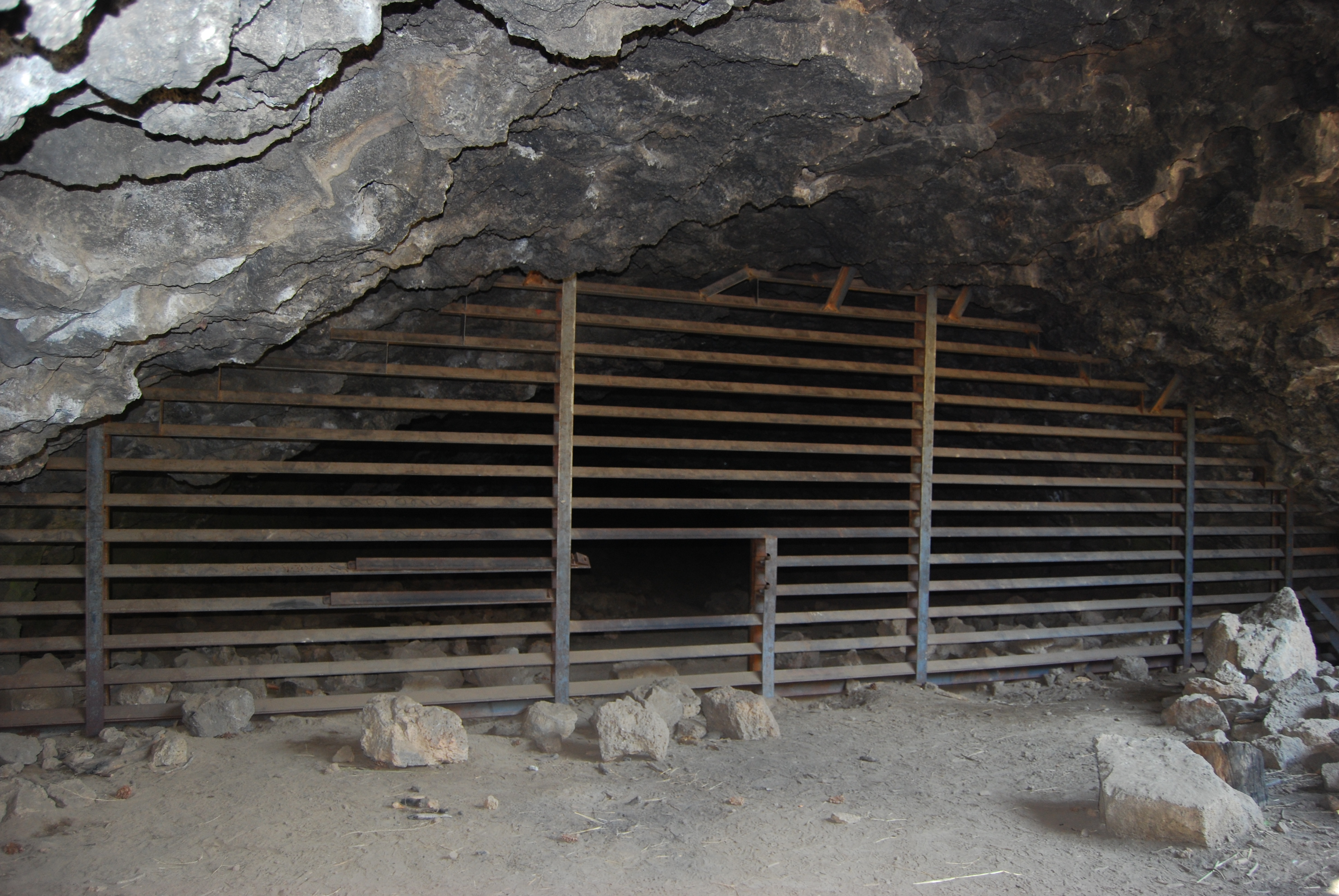
- Bat gate at the entrance of Skeleton Cave
- Interactive map of Skeleton Cave
- Location: Deschutes County, Oregon
- Coordinates: 43°57.016′N 121°10.638′W
- Length: 3,560 feet
- Entrances: 1
- Difficulty: Easy
- Access: May 1st thru September 30th via private tour

Skeleton Cave is a lava tube within Deschutes County, Oregon, of the United States. The cave is within Deschutes National Forest and is located on the northern flank of Newberry Volcano near the city of Bend. The cave is between 75,000 and 400,000 years old.

== Origin of the name ==
The cave was first documented by American settlers circa 1924, although a stick was found inside the cave with pencilled markings showing visitation from 1894. Perhaps on that same visit, an illegal moonshiner's still was found inside the cave. At one time the lava tube may have been referred to as Bone Cave but it received its current moniker as Skeleton Cave from Phil Brogan who observed many assorted pieces of skeletons within. One theory put forth by Dr. James W. Gidley, a scientist from the National Museum, claimed all the fossils fell into the cave from cracks in the ceiling created by earthquakes. Gidley believed this because he couldn't fathom why an animal would crawl all the way into the cave to die. The skylight entrance to the cave served as a natural trap in which animals could not escape. Several newspaper accounts note fossils within. The most noteworthy remnants belonged to a horse from the Pleistocene that was later identified as Equus niobrarensis. A bear at least "one third larger than any living species" was also found in the cave. Many other pieces of bone were found inside the cave.

A list of the known skeletal remains include:

- North American short-faced bear (Arctodus)
- Deer
- Elk
- Arctic fox
- Gray fox (Newton's and Townsend's)
- Horse
- Lynx
- Rodents
- Dire Wolf (nearly as large as Canis lupus occidentalis)
- A large hyena-like dog
- Marten-sized carnivore

== History ==
The cave was surveyed by Walter J. Perry and Phil Brogan using a compass and pace method. They measured a length of 3,036 feet. Perry then later sketched the outline of the cave passage. He noted a side passage at about 1,734 feet into the cave, which was later named the Bear Passage. This same passage is where the majority of the skeletons and bone dust were found. Perry would later be filmed in the cave by MGM and Fox News for a history film about the area.

In a book published by Ronald Greeley of NASA, the cave was surveyed and his map produced a length of 3,300 feet. But it did not include the small portion south of the entrance. In 1971, a complete survey by Jim Nieland discerned a more accurate length of 3,560 feet. Boyd Cave is a part of the same lava flow as Skeleton Cave and trends toward the Bear Passage, also known as the Tributary Tube.

In recent times prior to 2002, the cave, along with others nearby, was evaluated and an environmental impact assessment done. Skeleton Cave in particular had its parking lot relocated to minimize impact to the vegetation and cave resources. A seasonal closure was placed from October 15 to May 1 of every year for bat hibernation. The cave was historically known to be a bat cave (harboring bats) and was possibly mapped by the Bend Commercial club.

Today, Wanderlust Tours is the only company permitted to lead tours through Boyd Cave.
