= Equus alaskae =

Equus alaskae Temporal range: 2.588–0.009 Ma

Scientific classification
- Kingdom: Animalia
- Phylum: Chordata
- Class: Mammalia
- Order: Perissodactyla
- Family: Equidae
- Genus: Equus
- Subgenus: incertae sedis
- Species: †E. alaskae

Binomial name
- †Equus alaskae Winans 1989

Synonyms
- Equus conversidens leoni; Equus niobrarensis alaskae; Equus lambei Hay 1917; Onager lambei Hay 1917

Extinct Pleistocene species of horse

Equus alaskae was a Pleistocene species of horse, now extinct, that inhabited North America.

Fossils found from Alaska to Mexico have been identified as Equus alaskae, and it has been referred to as the most common equid in the southwest of North America. The species was medium to small-sized, around the dimensions of a cowpony.

== See also ==
- Evolution of the horse
- Equus conversidens
