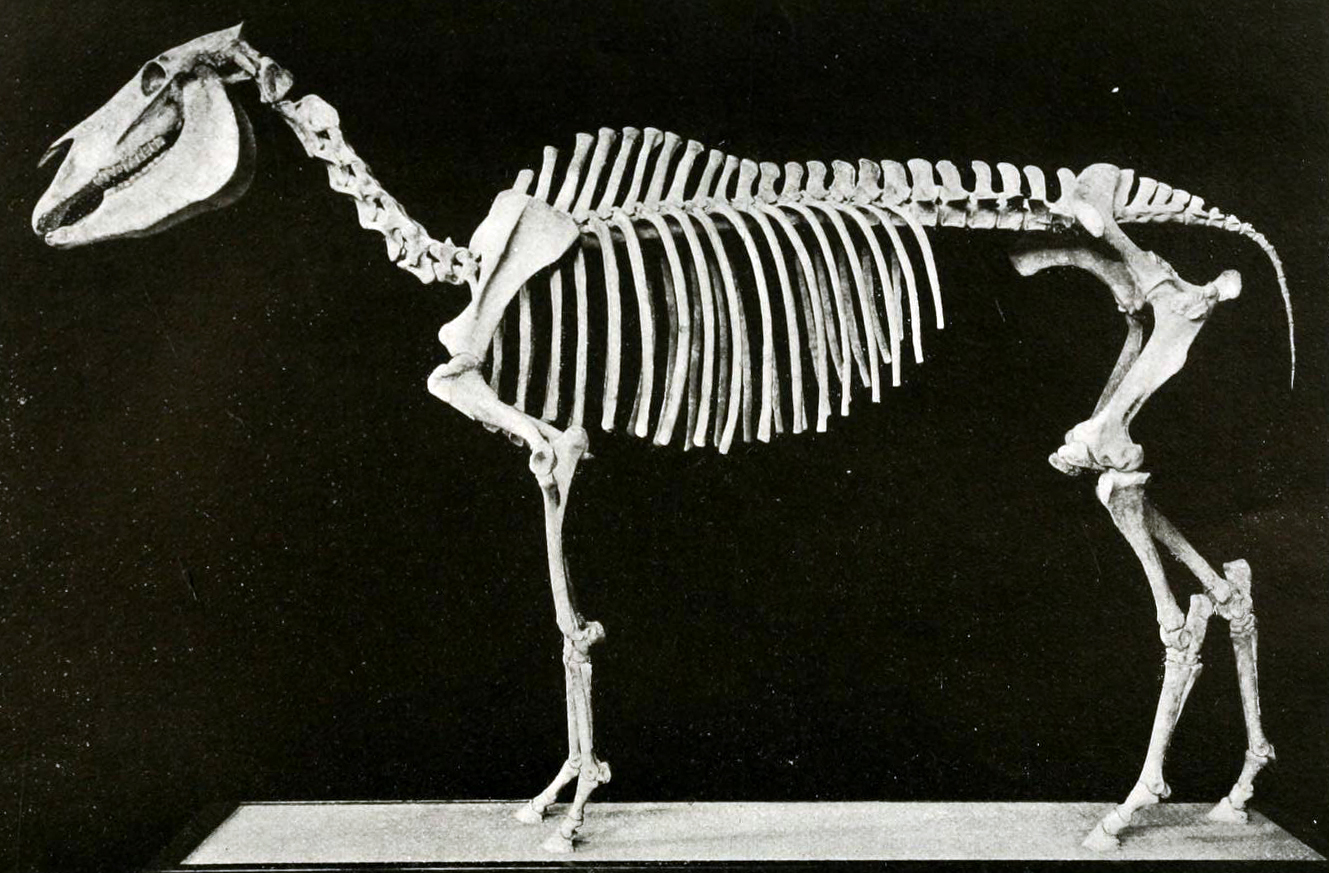
- A mounted skeleton of Equus scotti at the AMNH, constructed out of two skeletons

Scientific classification
- Kingdom: Animalia
- Phylum: Chordata
- Class: Mammalia
- Order: Perissodactyla
- Family: Equidae
- Genus: Equus
- Species: †E. scotti

Binomial name
- †Equus scotti Gidley, 1900

Synonyms
- †Equus bautistensis

= Equus scotti =

Equus scotti Temporal range: Early Pleistocene–Late Pleistocene

Extinct species of mammal

Equus scotti (translated from Latin as Scott's horse, named after vertebrate paleontologist William Berryman Scott) is an extinct species of horse native to Pleistocene North America.

== Evolution ==
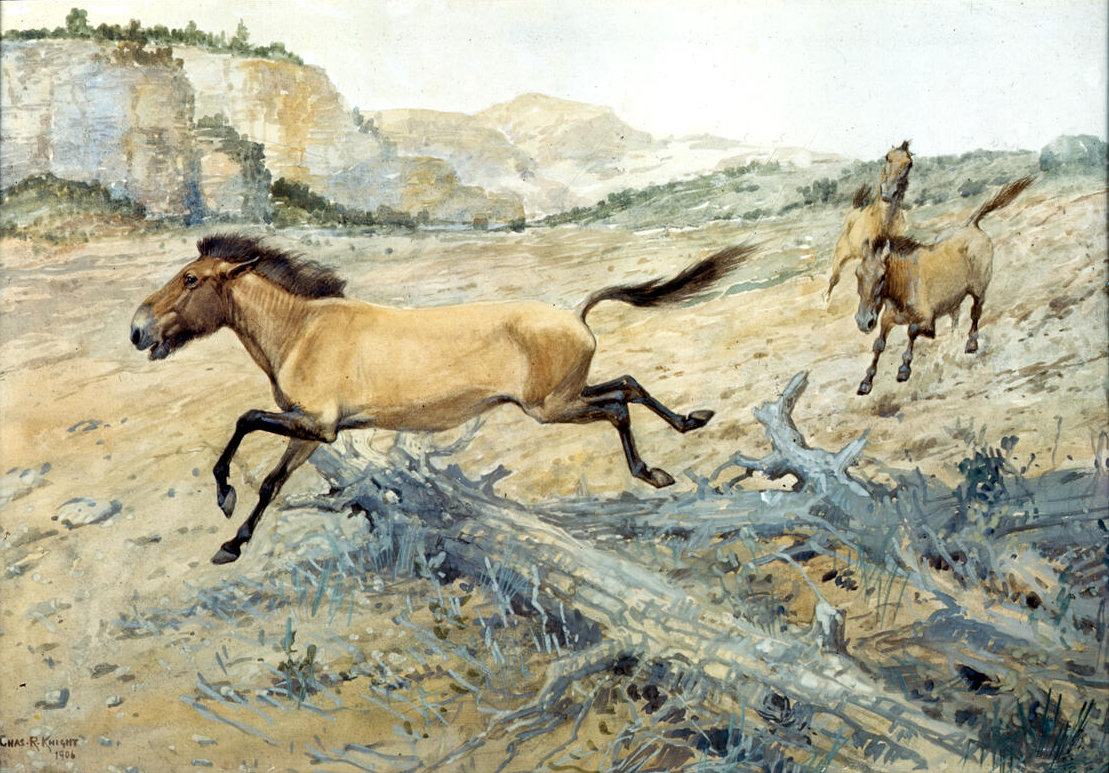
Life restoration by Charles R. Knight, 1906

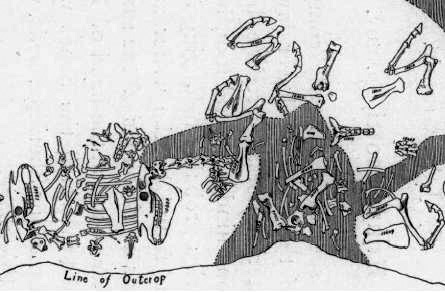
Assemblage of bones, illustrated as discovery in situ, of Equus scotti

Equus scotti is a true caballine horse that is more closely related to modern horses (Equus caballus and Equus ferus) than to zebras and asses. The taxonomy of North American Pleistocene caballine "stout legged" horses (as opposed to the "stilt legged" equines of the genus Haringtonhippus which they coexisted with) is highly convoluted and controversial, with numerous named species including Equus lambei, Equus niobarensis, Equus occidentalis and Equus conversidens (among many others), that may in reality represent a few or only one true species.^{(including supplemental material)} Although it has been suggested that Equus scotti and other North American caballine horses may be synonymous with living Eurasian Equus ferus,^{(including supplemental material)} ancient DNA indicates that North American horses are genetically distinct from their Eurasian counterparts, having diverged from them around 800,000 years ago, following the first dispersal of horses out of North America, with some interbreeding after the initial split.

The earliest remains of the species are known from the late Blancan during the Early Pleistocene. The youngest remains of the species date to the Late Pleistocene (Rancholabrean) around 12,000 years ago.

== Distribution ==
Paleontological excavations have identified the locations of numerous places where E. scotti occurred. The species was named from Rock Creek, Texas, United States, where multiple skeletons were recovered. A closely related fossil find was made of Equus bautistensis in California; this species appeared closely related, but of a slightly more primitive form than E. scotti. However, E. bautistensis was redefined as a junior synonym of E. scotti in 1998 by paleontologist E. Scott, who also assigned fossils from the Anza-Borrego Desert in California, tentatively interpreted to represent E. bautistensis, to E. scotti.

The distribution of the species includes: "Alberta, Ontario, Saskatchewan and Yukon (Canada) and in California, Florida, Idaho, Kansas, Nebraska, New Mexico, Oklahoma and Texas (United States)".

== See also ==
- Equus lambei
- Yakutian horse
- Evolution of the horse
