= China Hat (Oregon) =

Volcanic geological formation in Oregon

- Location within Oregon

Highest point
- Elevation: 6,573
- Coordinates: 43°40′51″N 121°02′02″W

Geography
- Location: Deschutes, Oregon, U.S.
- Parent range: Cascade Range
- Topo map: USGS China Hat

Geology
- Rock age: 6.3 - 7.4 Ma
- Mountain type: Pyroclastic cone
- Volcanic arc: Cascade Volcanic Arc
- Last eruption: Pleistocene

China Hat is a volcanic butte on the southeastern flank of Newberry Volcano in Deschutes County, Oregon, United States. It is a rhyolitic dome dating from the age of the Middle Pleistocene. Both China Hat and nearby East Butte are covered by Mazama Ash and Newberry Ash.

Although China Hat is often thought of as a side vent of Newberry Volcano less than ten miles away, it is estimated to be older than first formation of the Newberry Caldera, 780,000 thousand years old versus 500,000 years ago and is on the western edge of a series of high lava plains eruptions derived from a tongue of the same mantle plume that fuels the Yellowstone Caldera

China Hat Road, named after the butte, starts in Bend and heads to Fort Rock. The road is a hotspot for law enforcement. China Hat Campground is a campground located near China Hat butte along this road.

The butte was named for its similarity in appearance, when viewed from Fort Rock, to the Asian conical hat worn by Chinese immigrant laborers.
