= William Horn Cloud =

Traditional Lakota Singer

- Born: 1905 or 1907; Potato Creek, South Dakota, U.S.
- Died: 1992
- Father: Joseph Horn Cloud

William Horn Cloud (1905 - 1992), also known as known as William ‘Horncloud’, was a Lakota singer.

== Early life and family ==
William Horn Cloud was born in 1905 in Potato Creek, South Dakota. His father Joseph witnessed and survived the Wounded Knee Massacre at age 16, during which his father and mother were killed. William grew up on the Pine Ridge Indian Reservation.

William Horn Cloud married Nancy Red Cloud, the daughter of Oglala Lakota Chief Charles Red Cloud, who was the grandson of historical Chief Red Cloud (1822–1909) of Red Cloud's War 1866–1868. By September 1989, the couple lived on the Pine Ridge Indian Reservation.

== Musical career ==
Horn Cloud learned many traditional songs through Lakota elders. He was known in the powwow circuit as a singer, dancer, orator and interpreter of traditional Lakota songs and culture who greatly contributed to preserving Lakota, Sioux culture and tradition. Johnny Cash visited with Horn Cloud and played songs.

Horn Cloud was a regular performer for the Sun Dance and for Yuwipi ceremonies.

Some of Horn Cloud's tracks were re-released on Canyon Records’ Traditional Lakota Songs, which has tracks from Sioux Songs of War and Love. Both albums contain the track entitled "Honoring Song”, featuring Horn Clouds 86-year-old father-in-law Chief Charles Red Cloud of Pine Ridge South Dakota singing the song of his grandfather, Red Cloud; the lyrics describe the difficulty of being Indian in a white man's world. Horn Cloud's recording of the traditional Lakota 'love song’ is included on the album Lightning and Wind: The Voice and Flute of a Nation under the title 'Nióiye Wéksuye, with additional tracks by Kevin Locke.

=== Albums ===
- Sioux Songs of War and Love (1971, Canyon Records [cr-6150])
- Sings Sioux Rabbit Songs
- Sioux Love Song/ Rabbit Dance Song.

== Activism ==
In the late 1980s and 1990s, Horn Cloud was among a group of activists seeking government recognition of the Wounded Knee Massacre.
