= James W. Gidley =

American paleontologist

James Williams Gidley
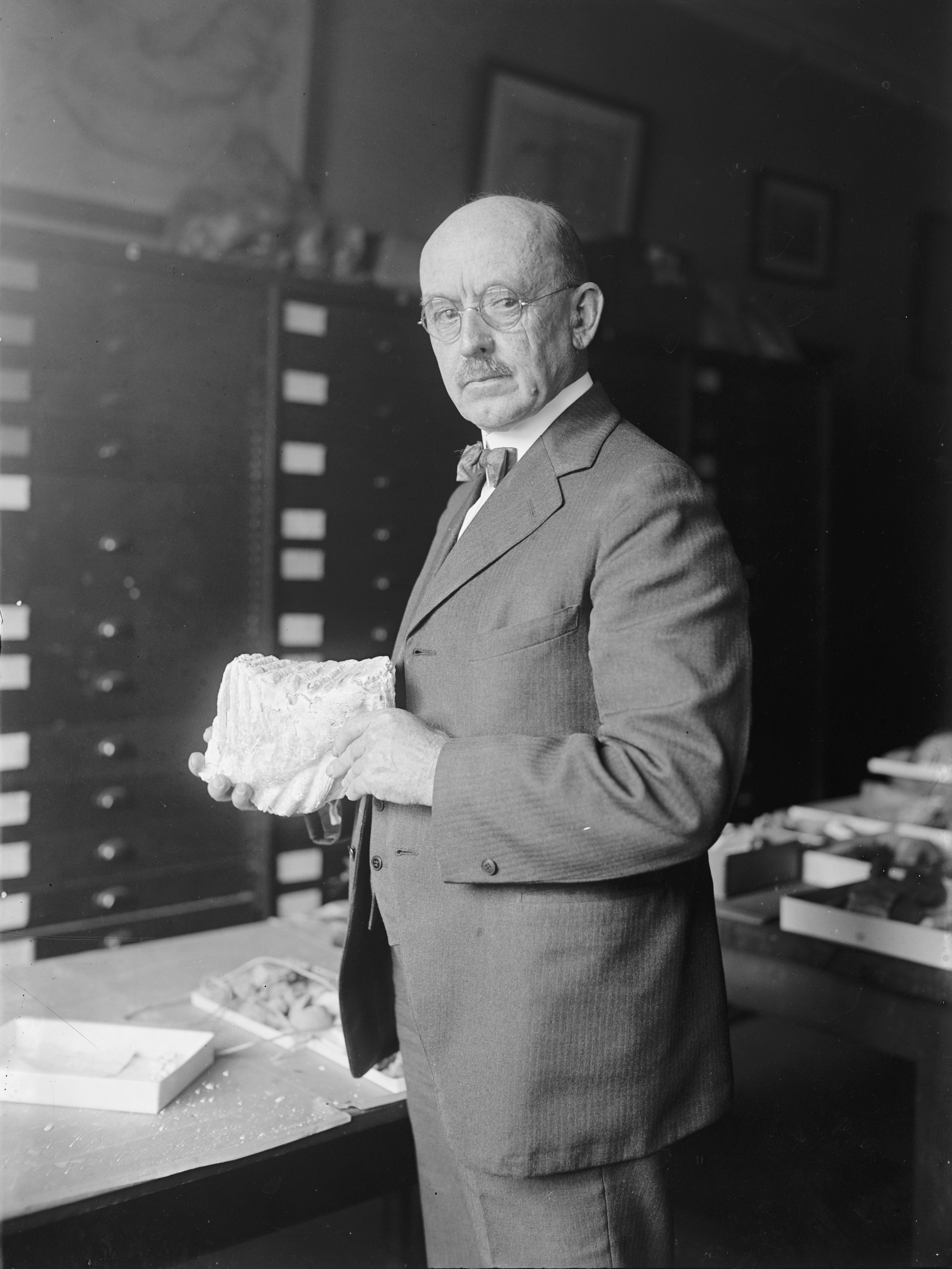
- Gidley in 1924
- Born: 1866
- Died: 1931 (aged 64–65)
- Scientific career
- Fields: Paleontology

James Williams Gidley (1866-1931) was an American paleontologist and museum curator.

== Biography ==
=== Life ===
Gidley was born in 1866, in Springwater, Iowa. He began collecting fossils during childhood. He attended Princeton University in Princeton, New Jersey, and received a Bachelor of Science degree in 1898 and a Master of Science degree in 1901. He later attended George Washington University, and earned a Ph.D. in 1922.

He died in 1931.

=== Career ===
While he pursued his formal education, Gidley became an assistant in vertebrate paleontology at the American Museum of Natural History, in 1892. He remained at this job until 1905, after which he joined the United States National Museum as the preparator in the section of vertebrate fossils. In 1908, after the development of the division of vertebrate paleontology, he became the custodian of fossil mammals. Four years later, in 1912, he became an assistant curator at USNM, a position he held until his death.

Gidley studied various fossil mammals throughout his career, including prehistoric rodents and horses. He described the species Equus scotti from Texas in 1899, and the three-toed horse genus Neohipparion from Nebraska in 1902. He named Armbruster's wolf in 1913. He began seeking remains of Pleistocene humans in Florida in the 1920s.
