= American Horse Creek =

Stream in South Dakota, U.S.

Coordinates: 43°26′20″N 102°11′47″W

American Horse Creek is a stream in the U.S. state of South Dakota.

Some say the creek bears the name of American Horse, an Oglala Lakota chief, while others believe the creek derives its name from an incident involving a certain Indian horse thief and his "American horses".

== See also ==
- List of rivers of South Dakota
