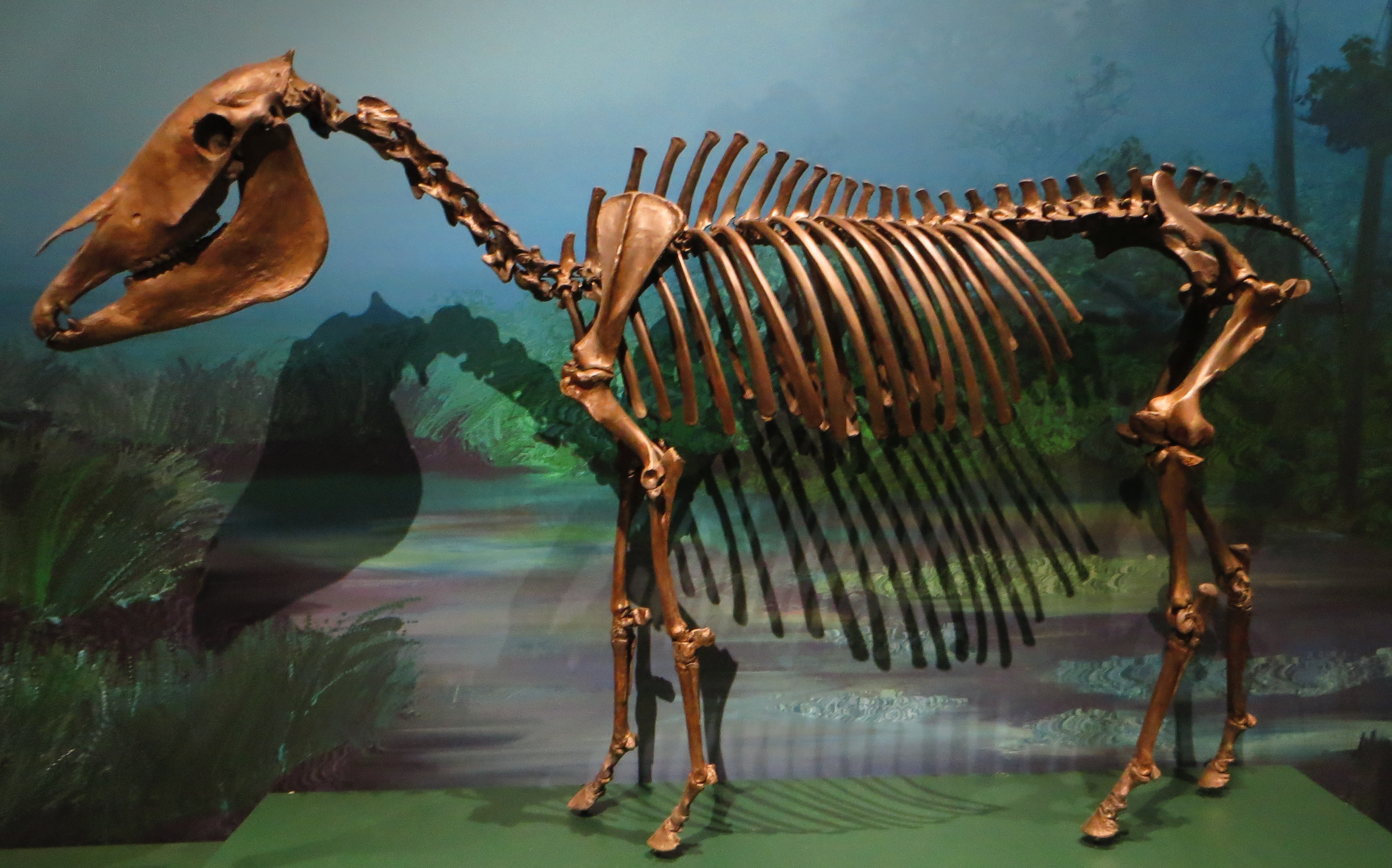

Scientific classification
- Kingdom: Animalia
- Phylum: Chordata
- Class: Mammalia
- Order: Perissodactyla
- Family: Equidae
- Genus: Equus
- Subgenus: incertae sedis
- Species: †E. conversidens

Binomial name
- †Equus conversidens Owen, 1869

Synonyms
- Asinus conversidens (Owen, 1869); Equus barcenaei Cope 1884; Equus barcenoei Cope 1884; Equus (Hemionus) conversidens; Onager zoyatalis Mooser 1959

= Equus conversidens =

Equus conversidens Temporal range: 2.588–0.009 Ma

Extinct species of mammal

Equus conversidens, or the Mexican horse, was a Pleistocene species of horse, now extinct, that inhabited North America.

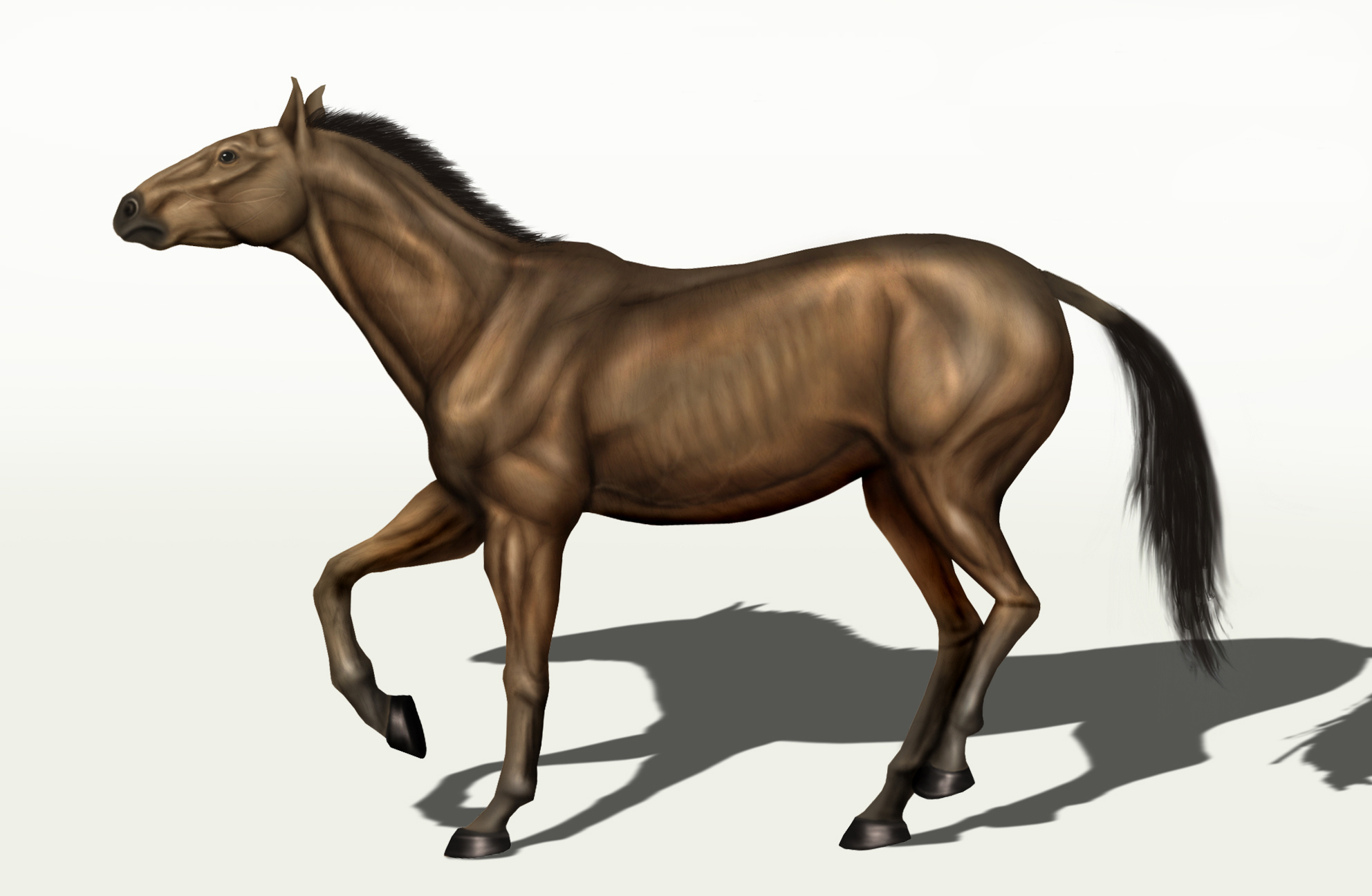
Life restoration

The holotype of Equus conversidens, a partial palate, was unearthed in Pleistocene deposits northeast of Mexico City, Mexico. In January 1963, a partial skeleton was found in the city of Canyon, Texas in a white clay bed during the excavation of a basement, and was referred to E. conversidens by Dalquest and Hughes (1965), who interpreted the species as medium to small-sized, and added additional records of the species from Texas (including a skeleton from Slaton), Arizona, New Mexico, Oklahoma, Kansas and Florida, synonymizing Equus francisci, Equus tau, E. littoralis, E. achates, and E. barcenaei with E. conversidens.

== Criticism ==
Winans (1985) and MacFadden (1992) challenged the validity of E. conversidens due to its minimal diagnostic value, and treated E. francisci as valid. Heintzman, et al. (2017) argue that it is in not a member of the Equus genus.

== See also ==
- Evolution of the horse
- Equus alaskae
