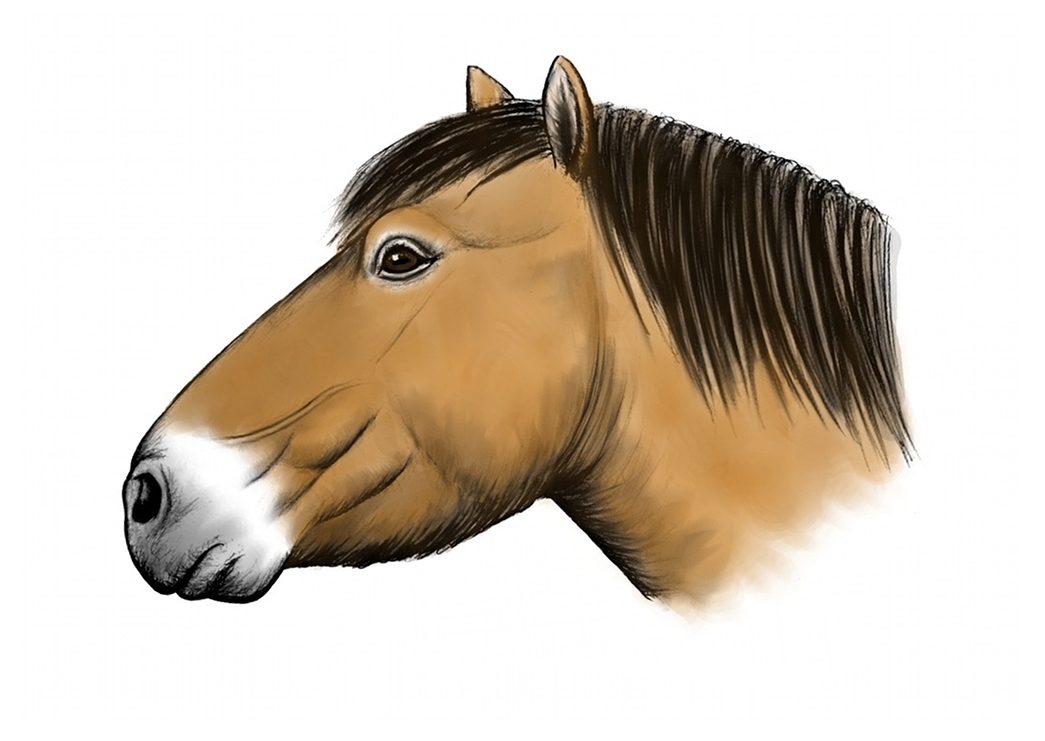
- Reconstruction of the Yukon horse, based on a skull

Scientific classification
- Kingdom: Animalia
- Phylum: Chordata
- Class: Mammalia
- Order: Perissodactyla
- Family: Equidae
- Genus: Equus
- Subgenus: incertae sedis
- Species: †E. lambei

Binomial name
- †Equus lambei Hay, 1917

= Equus lambei =

Yukon horse Temporal range: Late Pleistocene-Early Holocene

Extinct species of horse

Equus lambei, commonly known as the Yukon horse or Yukon wild horse, is an extinct species of the genus Equus. Equus lambei ranged across North America until approximately 10,000 years ago. Based on recent examinations of the mtDNA of Equus lambei remains, scientists have concluded that E. lambei was probably much like the extinct tarpan, also known as the Eurasian wild horse, and the living Przewalski's horse. A partial carcass of Equus lambei is on display at the Yukon Beringia Interpretive Centre in Whitehorse, Yukon.

== Description ==
Evidence from E. lambei mtDNA has shown that Equus lambei is a close relative of the modern wild horse, including the domestic horse, Equus caballus. Controversy still surrounds E. lambei and the divergence of other similar extinct horse species. Through examinations of the bones and teeth of Equus lambei, many similarities can be seen with the modern horse Equus caballus. There is also a strong resemblance to E. lambei in the metapodials of E. caballus przewalskii and the phalanges of E. caballus lenensis.

Metrical and morphological studies of horse teeth from the Bluefish Caves confirm the close similarity between Equus lambei with wild and domestic horses alive today. E. lambei is a caballus horse, not an ass. Among living horses, the Yukon horse most closely resembles the Przewalski's horse (Equus caballus przewalskii) from Mongolia (once extinct in the wild) particularly in size and proportions. However, the upper foot bones (metapodials) of Equus lambei are slender compared to Przewalski's horse. The bones of E. lambei also closely resemble the proximal phalanges of E. caballus lenensis, an extinct subspecies from the late Pleistocene of Siberia.

== Taxonomy ==
The taxonomy of Pleistocene North American horses has historically been confused, with many named species that probably represent synonyms of other named species. Equus lambei is one of the better supported species due to being based on diagnostic type material. Some authors have suggested that Equus lambei may be synonymous with the larger species Equus scotti, which may be in turn synonymous with Equus ferus. However, North American and Eurasian horses split around 800,000 years ago following the dispersal of the latter out of North America, and have been largely genetically separate, with some interbreeding following the split.

== Natural history ==
Along with steppe bison (Bison priscus), woolly mammoths (Mammuthus primigenius) and caribou (Rangifer tarandus), Equus lambei was one of the most common ice-age species known to occupy the steppe-like grasslands of Eastern Beringia. E. lambei can be identified by numerous teeth and bones, and one partial carcass discovered in 1993. This E. lambei carcass yielded a radiocarbon date of 26,280 ± 210 years BP. The carcass consisted of a large part of the hide, a few tailbones, one lower leg, and some intestine. The hide retained some long blondish mane and tail hairs, coarse whitish upper body hairs, and dark brown hairs on the lower leg. Large numbers of E. lambei teeth have been found in archaeological sites in the Yukon.

Based on the fossil records discovered in the Yukon, Equus lambei is believed to have been a small, slender, caballoid horse (about 4 ft (1.2 m) tall), with a broad skull and a relatively long protocones.

== Social structure ==
Specifically, the records indicates that E. lambei had a multi-seasonal presence in the same region as other horse species, and a social structure similar to other wild horses. Family herds included four to ten females with their young and an adult alpha stallion. Other males were gathered in less socially stable bachelor herds, and consist from groups of two to four adults. These two herds did not often share territories.

== Habitat and diet ==
Both family and bachelor herds were non-selective grazers that forged mostly in a savannah-like regions. These horses fed mostly on grasses, sedges, poppies, mustards, and other flowers such as buttercups and roses. Equus lambei's preferred environment is believed to have been a woodland with sparse clumps of trees. Overall, E. lambei is considered to have been resistant to varying climatic conditions, although most individuals of this species seemed to have died in the winter season. It is also likely that the Equus lambei was susceptible to wolf predation.

== See also ==
- Yakutian horse
- Evolution of the horse
