= Cromer Forest Bed =

Geological formation in Norfolk, England

Cromer Forest-bed Formation
- Stratigraphic range: Early Pleistocene - Middle Pleistocene 2–0.5 Ma
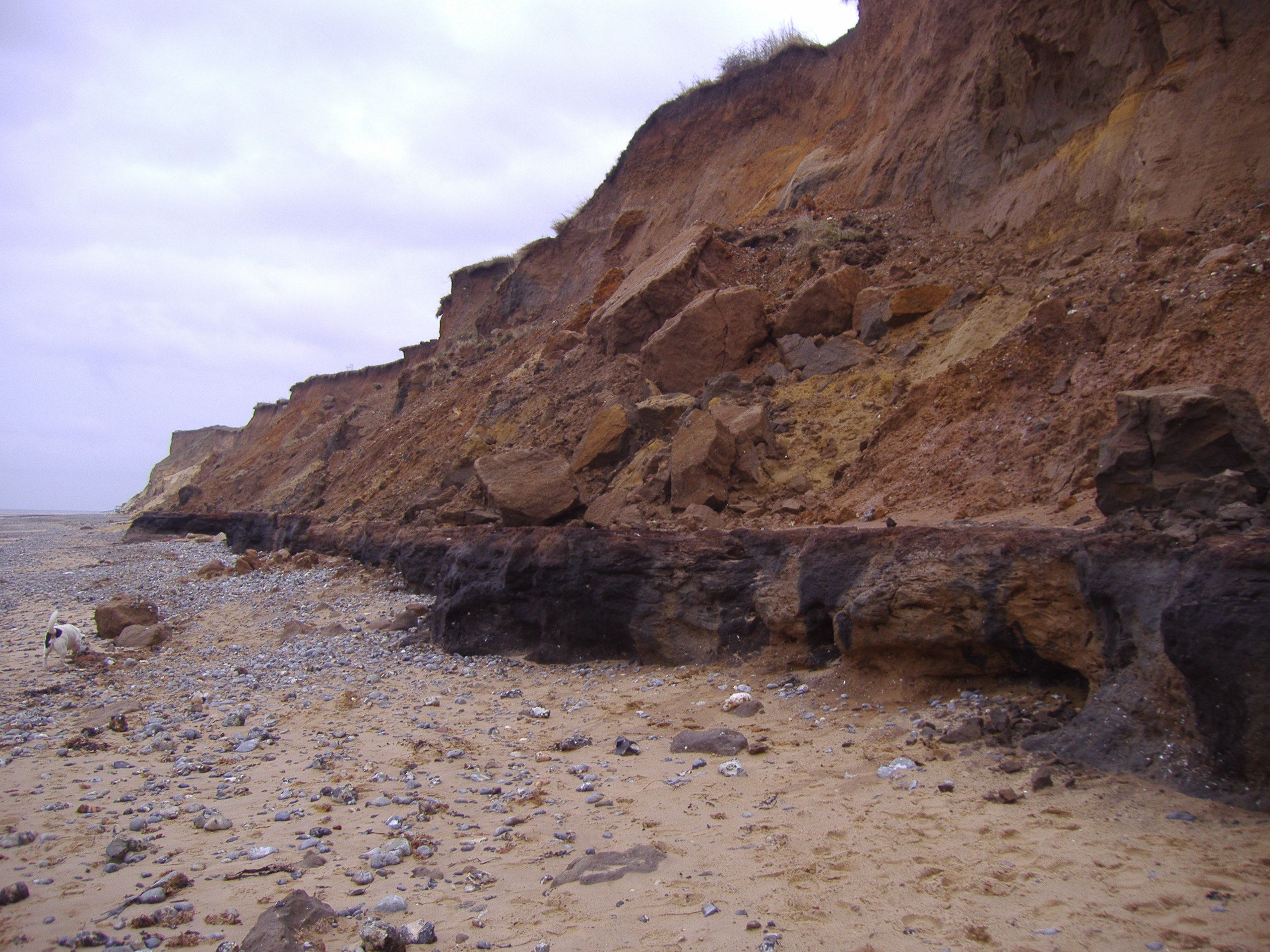
- Cromer Forest-bed Formation exposed at the base of the West Runton Cliffs
- Type: Geological formation
- Unit of: Dunwich Group
- Sub-units: Sheringham Member, Runton Member, West Runton Member, and Bacton Member
- Underlies: Middle Pleistocene glacial deposits
- Overlies: Wroxham Crag Formation or unconformity with Chalk Group
- Thickness: around 6 metres (20 ft)

Lithology
- Primary: sands and silts
- Other: peat, mud, silty marl

Location
- Coordinates: 52.941°N 1.253°E
- Region: Norfolk
- Country: England

Type section
- Named for: Cromer
- Named by: Clement Reid
- Location: The coast of North Norfolk from Weybourne to Happisburgh
- Year defined: 1882
- Country: England

The Cromer Forest-bed Formation, sometimes known as the Cromer Forest Bed, is a Pleistocene aged geological formation in Norfolk, England. It consists of river gravels, estuary and floodplain sediments predominantly silt, sand, and muds as well as peat along the coast of northern Norfolk. The formation records a number of glacial cycles, with deposition occurring in both relatively cold environments during glacial periods, as well during interglacial periods when the area had a temperate climate. The Cromer Forest Bed itself varies in age from about 2 to 0.5 million years ago, from the Early Pleistocene to early Middle Pleistocene, though the most fossiliferous strata, such as the West Runton Freshwater Bed date to towards the end of deposition during the early Middle Pleistocene. The fossiliferous West Runton Freshwater Bed is the type locality for the Cromerian Stage of the early Middle Pleistocene between 0.8 and 0.5 million years ago. Some fossils from the Cromer Forest Bed likely come from Early Pleistocene layers, though many finds are found out of stratigraphic context.

It is about 6 metres (20 ft) thick and is exposed in cliff section near the village of West Runton.

== Paleontology and paleoanthropology ==
For over a century, this formation, named after the local town of Cromer, has been famous for its assemblage of fossil mammal remains, containing the diverse remains of numerous taxa.

The West Runton Mammoth, a largely complete skeleton of the steppe mammoth (Mammuthus trogontherii) is one of the best preserved finds found in the West Runton Freshwater Bed. The oldest human footprints outside Africa, the Happisburgh footprints as well as handaxes and bison bones with cut marks were also found in layers considered to belong to this deposit near Happisburgh, dated to around 1 million to 780,000 years ago.

=== Mammals ===
==== Carnivorans ====
Species	Locality	Notes	Image
Panthera gombaszogensis	West Runon Freshwater Bed	Often called the European jaguar and posited to the ancestor of the living American jaguar (Panthera onca)	
Panthera fossilis	West Runon Freshwater Bed, Pakefield	A close relative of the modern lion (Panthera leo), and one of the largest cats to have ever lived. Ancestor of the Late Pleistocene cave lion (Panthera spelaea). Older publications assigned remains of P. fossilis to P. leo	
Felis cf. lunensis	West Runon Freshwater Bed	A primitive member of the genus Felis, which includes the domestic cat and its close relatives	
Ursus sp.	West Runon Freshwater Bed	Possibly represents brown bears (Ursus arctos) or members of the cave bear lineage	
Ursus deningeri	Bacton, Pakefield	Ancestor of the later cave bear (Ursus spelaea)	Skeleton on display in France
Canis mosbachensis	West Runon Freshwater Bed	A smaller ancestor of the modern grey wolf (Canis lupus)	
Lynx sp.	West Runon Freshwater Bed	A lynx	
Crocuta crocuta	West Runon Freshwater Bed	Closely related to living African spotted hyenas, have also been attributed to cave hyenas in older works.	
Homotherium latidens	West Runon Freshwater Bed	A lion-sized saber-toothed cat	
Pachycrocuta brevirostris	Bacton, Overstrand	A giant hyena, the largest ever	
Lutra simplicidens	West Runon Freshwater Bed	An extinct otter	
Pannonictis pliocaenica	West Runon Freshwater Bed	An extinct mustelid belonging to the subfamily Ictonychinae	
Martes martes	West Runon Freshwater Bed	Commonly known as the pine marten, species extant	
Mustela nivalis	West Runon Freshwater Bed	Commonly known as the least weasel, species extant	
Mustela erminea	West Runon Freshwater Bed	Commonly known as the stoat, species extant	

==== Ungulates ====
Species	Locality	Notes	Image
Cervus elaphus		Commonly known as red deer, species extant	
Praemegaceros verticornis		A giant deer belonging to the genus Praemegaceros. Sometimes referred to in historical publications as Megaloceros verticornis	A P. verticornis skeleton from Germany
Praemegaceros dawkinsi		A moderately sized deer.	
Megaloceros savini		A reindeer-sized deer species	A M. savini-type antler (top right), compared to that of an Irish elk (M. giganteus)
Dama sp.		An early indeterminate fallow deer	
Capreolus capreolus		Commonly known as roe deer, species extant	
Cervus rhenanus		A smaller deer with three-pointed antlers	
Eucladoceros ctenoides/tegulensis		A giant deer	Antlers of Eucladoceros ctenoides/tegulensis on display in the Netherlands
Eucladoceros tetraceros		A giant deer	Antlers of Eucladoceros ctenoides/tegulensis on display in the Netherlands
Eucladoceros sedgwickii		A giant deer	Antlers of Eucladoceros ctenoides/tegulensis on display in the Netherlands
Cervalces latifrons		A larger ancestor of the modern moose (Alces alces), one of the largest deer ever	Cervalces latifrons antlers on display in Germany
Hippopotamus antiquus		A larger relative of the modern hippopotamus (Hippotamus amphibius)	Specimen on display in Italy
Bison schoetensacki		A primitive bison	Specimen on display in Germany
Sus scrofa	West Runton Freshwater Bed	Commonly known as wild boar, species extant	
Stephanorhinus hundsheimensis	West Runton Freshwater Bed	A rhinoceros belonging to the extinct genus Stephanorhinus	Skull on display in Germany
Equus cf. suessenbornensis	West Runton Freshwater Bed	A stenonine equine	
Equus cf. altidens	West Runton Freshwater Bed	A stenonine equine	

==== Proboscidea ====
Species	Locality	Notes	Image
Mammuthus trogontherii	West Runton Freshwater Bed	Commonly known as the steppe mammoth, known from a mostly complete skeleton, the West Runton Mammoth collected from the West Runton Freshwater bed in 1990.	
Mammuthus meridionalis		A more primitive mammoth chronologically earlier than M. trogontherii	Specimen on display in France
Palaeoloxodon antiquus		Commonly known as the straight-tusked elephant, a larger relative of African elephants	

==== Eulipotyphla ====
Species	Locality	Notes	Image
Sorex runtonensis	West Runton Freshwater Bed	An extinct shrew belonging the genus Sorex	
Sorex savini	West Runton Freshwater Bed	An extinct shrew belonging the genus Sorex	
Sorex cf. minutus	West Runton Freshwater Bed	Remains closely resembling and possibly conspecific with the living pygmy shrew (Sorex minutus)	
Macroneomys brachygnathus	West Runton Freshwater Bed	A large extinct shrew	
Neomys newtoni	West Runton Freshwater Bed	An extinct water shrew belonging to the genus Neomys	
Desmana sp.	West Runton Freshwater Bed	A desman related to the living Russian desman (Desmana moschata)	
Talpa minor	West Runton Freshwater Bed	An extinct mole belonging to the genus Talpa	
Talpa europaea	West Runton Freshwater Bed	Commonly known as the European mole, species extant	
Erinaceus sp.	West Runton Freshwater Bed	A hedgehog, closely related to the living European hedgehog (Erinaceus europaeus)	

==== Primates ====
Species	Locality	Notes	Image
Macaca sylvanus	West Runton Freshwater Bed	Commonly known as the Barbary macaque. Though extinct in Europe (with the exception of Gibraltar), it remains extant in North Africa	

==== Bats ====
Species	Locality	Notes	Image
Nyctalus noctula	West Runton Freshwater Bed	Known as the common noctule, species extant	

==== Glires ====
Species	Locality	Notes	Image
Lepus sp.	West Runton Freshwater Bed	A hare	
Sciurus whitei	West Runton Freshwater Bed	An extinct squirrel belonging to the genus Sciurus, closely related to the living red squirrel (Sciurus vulgaris)	
Castor fiber	West Runton Freshwater Bed	Commonly known as the Eurasian beaver, species extant	
Trogontherium cuvieri	West Runton Freshwater Bed	An extinct member of the beaver family Castoridae somewhat larger than living beavers	
Cricetus runtonensis	West Runton Freshwater Bed	An extinct hamster belonging to the genus Cricetus, closely related to the living European hamster (Cricetus cricetus). Some authors have attributed the remains to the living species.	Modern European hamster
Cricetulus migratorius	West Runton Freshwater Bed	Commonly known as the grey dwarf hamster, species extant though no longer living in Britain	
Pliomys episcopalis	West Runton Freshwater Bed	A vole belonging to the extinct genus Pliomys	
Clethrionomys hintonianus	West Runton Freshwater Bed	An extinct vole belonging to the genus Clethrionomys	
Mimomys savini	West Runton Freshwater Bed	A vole belonging to the extinct genus Mimomys, related to living water voles (Arvicola)	
Microtus gregaloides	West Runton Freshwater Bed	An extinct vole belonging to the genus Microtus	
Microtus arvalidens	West Runton Freshwater Bed	An extinct vole belonging to the genus Microtus	
Microtus ratticepoides	West Runton Freshwater Bed	An extinct vole belonging to the genus Microtus	
Apodemus sylvaticus	West Runton Freshwater Bed	Commonly known as the wood mouse, species extant	

=== Birds ===
A variety of birds are known from the Cromer Forest Bed.

Species	Locality	Notes	Image
Phalacrocorax cf. carbo	West Runton Freshwater Bed	Remains closely resembling and possibly conspecific with the living great cormorant (Phalacrocorax carbo)	
Cygnus sp.	West Runton Freshwater Bed	A swan	
Anser sp.	West Runton Freshwater Bed	A goose	
Anatinae spp.	West Runton Freshwater Bed	Remains of several species of ducks	
Grus cf. Grus grus	West Runton Freshwater Bed	Remains closely resembling and possibly conspecific with the living common crane (Grus grus)	
cf. Gallinula chloropus	West Runton Freshwater Bed	Remains closely resembling and possibly conspecific with the living common moorhen (Gallinula chloropus)	
Turdus sp.	West Runton Freshwater Bed	A thrush	
Sturnus sp.	West Runton Freshwater Bed	A starling	
Corvidae indet	West Runton Freshwater Bed	A small bird belonging to the crow family	
"Gallus" europaeus		Known from a coracoid, identification considered doubtful, and it has been suggested that "it is likely that it represents a living large galliform species."	
Aythya ferina		The Common Pochard	
Netta rufina		Red Crested Pochard	
Melanitta nigra		Common Scoter	
Passeriformes indet		A perching bird	

=== Amphibians ===
Species	Locality	Notes	Image
Triturus vulgaris	West Runton Freshwater Bed	Commonly known as the smooth newt, species extant	
Triturus sp. nov	West Runton Freshwater Bed	An extinct salamander belonging to the genus Triturus	
Bufo bufo	West Runton Freshwater Bed	Known as the common toad, species extant	
Hyla arborea	West Runton Freshwater Bed	Commonly known as the European tree frog, species extant	
Rana arvalis	West Runton Freshwater Bed	Commonly known as the Moor frog, species extant	
Pelophylax cf. ridibundus	West Runton Freshwater Bed	Remains closely related to the living marsh frog (Pelophylax ridibundus), recorded under the synonymous name Rana (ridibunda) sp.	
Rana temporaria	West Runton Freshwater Bed	Known as the common frog, species extant	
Rana cf. dalmatina	West Runton Freshwater Bed	Remains closely resembling and possibly conspecific with the living agile frog (Rana dalmatina)	

=== Reptiles ===
Species	Locality	Notes	Image
Anguis fragilis	West Runton Freshwater Bed	Commonly known as the slow worm, species extant	
Natrix natrix	West Runton Freshwater Bed	Commonly known as the grass snake, species extant	
Vipera berus	West Runton Freshwater Bed	Commonly known as the adder, species extant	

=== Fish ===
Species	Locality	Notes	Image
Esox lucius		Commonly known as the Northern pike, species extant	
Perca fluviatilis		Commonly known as the European perch, species extant	
Tinca tinca		Commonly known as the tench, species extant	
Abramis bjoerkna		Commonly known as the white bream, species extant	
Scardinius erythrophthalmus		Known as the common rudd, species extant	
Rutilus rutilus		Known as the common roach, species extant	
Leuciscus idus		Commonly known as the ide, species extant	
Squalius cephalus		Known as the common chub, species extant	
Anguilla anguilla		Commonly known as the European eel, species extant	
Gasterosteus aculeatus		Commonly known as the three-spined stickleback, species extant	

=== Insects ===
A variety of beetles are known from the Cromer Forest Bed, including the West Runton Freshwater Bed, representing a temperate climate, and from Sidestrand, representing a cold glacial climate.

=== Flora ===
Pollen and macrofossils from the West Runton Freshwater Bed indicates the presence of a variety of plants at the time of deposition, representing a forest and wetland environment with a temperate climate near to the North Sea coast.

Species	Locality	Notes	Image
Alnus glutinosa	West Runton Freshwater Bed	Commonly known as European alder, species extant	
Betula	West Runton Freshwater Bed	Commonly known as birch	
Plantago major	West Runton Freshwater Bed	Commonly known as broadleaf plantain, species extant	
Urtica dioica	West Runton Freshwater Bed	Commonly known as stinging nettles, species extant	
Picea sp.	West Runton Freshwater Bed	Commonly known as spruce	
Heracleum sphondylium	West Runton Freshwater Bed	Commonly known as hogweed, species extant	
Stellaria media	West Runton Freshwater Bed	Commonly known as chickweed, species extant	
Schoenoplectus lacustris	West Runton Freshwater Bed	Known as the common club-rush, species extant	
Sparganium erectum	West Runton Freshwater Bed	Known as the simplestem bur-reed, species extant	
Typha sp.	West Runton Freshwater Bed	Commonly known as bullrush or cattail	
Bidens tripartita	West Runton Freshwater Bed	Known as the three-lobe beggarticks, species extant	
Epilobium cf. hirsutum	West Runton Freshwater Bed	Commonly known as the great or hairy willowherb, species extant	
Eupatorium cannabinum	West Runton Freshwater Bed	Commonly known as the hemp-agrimony, species extant	
Ajuga reptans	West Runton Freshwater Bed	Commonly known as the bugleherb, species extant	
Thalictrum flavum	West Runton Freshwater Bed	Commonly known as the yellow meadow-rue, species extant	
Cyperus fuscus	West Runton Freshwater Bed	Commonly known as the brown galingale, species extant	
Eleocharis palustris	West Runton Freshwater Bed	Known as the common spike-rush, species extant	
Juncus sp.	West Runton Freshwater Bed	Indeterminate rushes	
Persicaria lapathifolia	West Runton Freshwater Bed	Known by several common names including pale persicaria and pale smartweed, species extant	
Potentilla sp.	West Runton Freshwater Bed	Commonly known as cinquefoils	
Ranunculus	West Runton Freshwater Bed	Includes indeterminate members of the subgenera Ranunculus subgenus Ranunculus and Batrachium	
Azolla filiculoides	West Runton Freshwater Bed	An aquatic fern. Became extinct in Europe during the Pleistocene, but was reintroduced to the region in historic times	
Hydrocharis morsus-ranae	West Runton Freshwater Bed	Commonly known as the European frog-bit, species extant	
Nuphar lutea	West Runton Freshwater Bed	Commonly known as the yellow water-lily, species extant	
Nymphaea alba	West Runton Freshwater Bed	Commonly known as the white water-lily, species extant	
Stratiotes aloides	West Runton Freshwater Bed	Commonly known as the water soldier, species extant	
Ceratophyllum demersum	West Runton Freshwater Bed	Commonly known as hornwort, species extant	
Groenlandia densa	West Runton Freshwater Bed	An aquatic plant, species extant	
Chara sp.	West Runton Freshwater Bed	An alga	
Rubus idaeus	West Runton Freshwater Bed	Commonly known as the red raspberry, species extant	
Rabelera holostea	West Runton Freshwater Bed	Commonly known as the greater stitchwort, species extant. Labelled in study under previous name Stellaria holostea	
Oxybasis cf. rubra	West Runton Freshwater Bed	Commonly known as the red goosefoot, species extant. Labelled in study under previous name Chenopodium rubrum	
Salix sp.	West Runton Freshwater Bed	Commonly known as willow, represented by pollen	
Corylus	West Runton Freshwater Bed	Commonly known as hazel represented by pollen	
Pinus	West Runton Freshwater Bed	Commonly known as pine, represented by pollen	
Quercus	West Runton Freshwater Bed	Commonly known as oak, represented by pollen	
Ulmus	West Runton Freshwater Bed	Commonly known as elm, represented by pollen	
Polypodium vulgare	West Runton Freshwater Bed	Known as the common polypody, species extant, represented by spores	
Pteridium aquilinum	West Runton Freshwater Bed	Commonly known as bracken, species extant, represented by spores	
Anemone	West Runton Freshwater Bed	Commonly known as windflowers, represented by pollen	
Mercurialis perennis	West Runton Freshwater Bed	Commonly known as dogs mercury, species extant	
Aster	West Runton Freshwater Bed	Represented by pollen	
Centaurea scabiosa	West Runton Freshwater Bed	Commonly known as greater knapweed, represented by pollen	
Cirsium/Carduus	West Runton Freshwater Bed	Commonly known as thistles, represented by pollen	
Anthemis	West Runton Freshwater Bed	Commonly known as camomile, represented by pollen	
Taraxacum	West Runton Freshwater Bed	Commonly known as dandelions, represented by pollen	
Hypericum perforatum	West Runton Freshwater Bed	Commonly known as St. John's wort, represented by pollen	
Plantago lanceolata	West Runton Freshwater Bed	Commonly known as ribwort, represented by pollen	
Rumex acetosa	West Runton Freshwater Bed	Commonly known as sorrel, represented by pollen	
Vicia/Lathyrus	West Runton Freshwater Bed	Pollen representing either vetches, peavines, or both	
Capsella	West Runton Freshwater Bed	Commonly known as sherpard's purse, represented by pollen	
Sinapis	West Runton Freshwater Bed	Commonly known as mustard, represented by pollen	
Rumex crispus	West Runton Freshwater Bed	Commonly known as curly dock, represented by pollen	
Persicaria maculosa	West Runton Freshwater Bed	Commonly known as lady's thumb, represented by pollen	
Plantago maritima	West Runton Freshwater Bed	Commonly known as sea plantain, represented by pollen	
Armeria	West Runton Freshwater Bed	Commonly known as thrifts, represented by pollen	
Ballota nigra	West Runton Freshwater Bed	Commonly known as black horehound, species extant	
Poaceae	West Runton Freshwater Bed	Unidentified grass pollen	

== See also ==
- Cromerian Stage
- Pakefield
- Red Crag Formation
