= West Runton Mammoth =

Coordinates: 52.9408°N 1.2535°E

- Mammuthus trogontherii
- Interactive map of West Runton Mammoth
- Type: Fossilized remains
- Periods: Cromerian Stage; 866,000–478,000 years ago
- Location: Found at the base of the cliffs on West Runton Beach
- Region: West Runton, North Norfolk, United Kingdom

Site notes
- Discovered: 1990
- Management: Norfolk Museums Service
- Public access: Cromer Museum, Norwich Castle Museum & Art Gallery, Norfolk Collections Centre (Gressenhall Farm and Workhouse), Seaview Beach Cafe West Runton

The West Runton Mammoth is a fossilized skeleton of a steppe mammoth (Mammuthus trogontherii) found in the cliffs of West Runton in the county of Norfolk, England in 1990. The find is the largest nearly complete mammoth skeleton known, and is the oldest found in the United Kingdom.

== Discovery, excavation and preservation ==
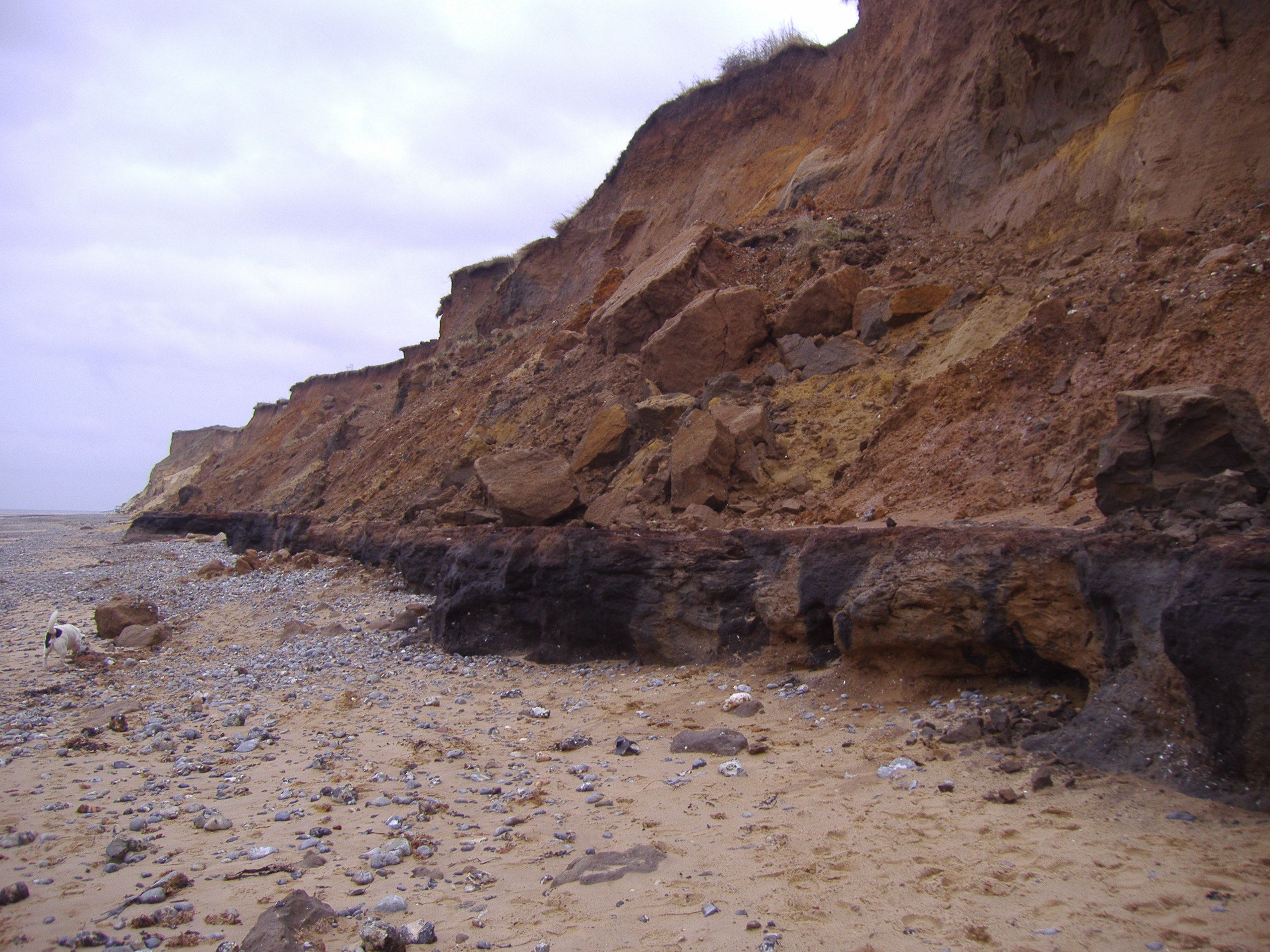
The cliffs at West Runton

Following a stormy night on 13 December 1990, local residents Margaret and Harold Hems, found that a large bone had been partially exposed at the base of the cliffs in the Cromer Forest Bed. They contacted Norfolk Museums Service who identified it as a pelvic bone of a large steppe mammoth. After another storm just over a year later, a local fossil hunter discovered more and in January 1992 the Norfolk Archaeological Unit undertook an exploratory excavation at the site.

A major three-month excavation by the Norfolk Archaeological Unit followed in 1995. Funding from the Heritage lottery Fund and from Anglian Water was gained by Norfolk Museums Service. Details of animal remains, other fossils, stratigraphy, mineralogy and chemistry were mapped and recorded. During the excavations almost ten tonnes of soil were sieved for the bones of amphibians, mammals and birds.

The bones were wrapped in tissue paper and foil before being encased in plaster of Paris and supported by large splints to protect them. A cradle was constructed to support the well-preserved skull and the tusks. The skull and tusk were lifted out by crane on the last day of the dig before the hole was backfilled.

At the conservation laboratory at Gressenhall, the examination process revealed that the carcass of the mammoth had been scavenged by spotted hyenas (shown by the teeth marks found on the bones). Some hyena droppings were also identified. Pathology revealed that the mammoth had a diseased and deformed right knee, which was likely to have contributed to the death of this relatively young animal.

The material was catalogued. The smaller bones were placed in special archive trays or boxes. For the larger bones, permanent rigid jackets were created with a soft archival foam layer and a rigid resin jacket supporting. The heaviest of the bones are stored on their own trolleys. All the bones are stored in an environmentally controlled building.

== Conclusions ==
The skeleton is the best example of the species Mammuthus trogontherii to be unearthed so far, being 85% complete. Previous finds include two partial skeletons found in Germany and Russia, both of which were only about 10 to 15% complete. The mammoth was male, stood some 4 metres (13 ft) at the shoulder and would have weighed about 10 tonnes (11 short tons). This is twice the weight of the modern African elephant Loxodonta africana.

Study of the pollen, amphibians, snails and small mammals from the site suggest that the landscape consisted of bodies of slow moving fresh water near to the sea, with a good amount of vegetation and moist woodland present. The climate of the Cromerian Stage was typical of a Pleistocene interglacial in this area, almost identical to the climate there today.

== Exhibitions ==
Due to the weight and size of the remains of the West Runton Mammoth, only a few selected bones are on display in Norwich Castle Museum, Norfolk Collections Centre at Gressenhall Farm and Workhouse Museum and at Cromer Museum. A cast of the original tibia of the mammoth is now on display and can be seen at Seaview Beach Cafe, Water Lane, West Runton.

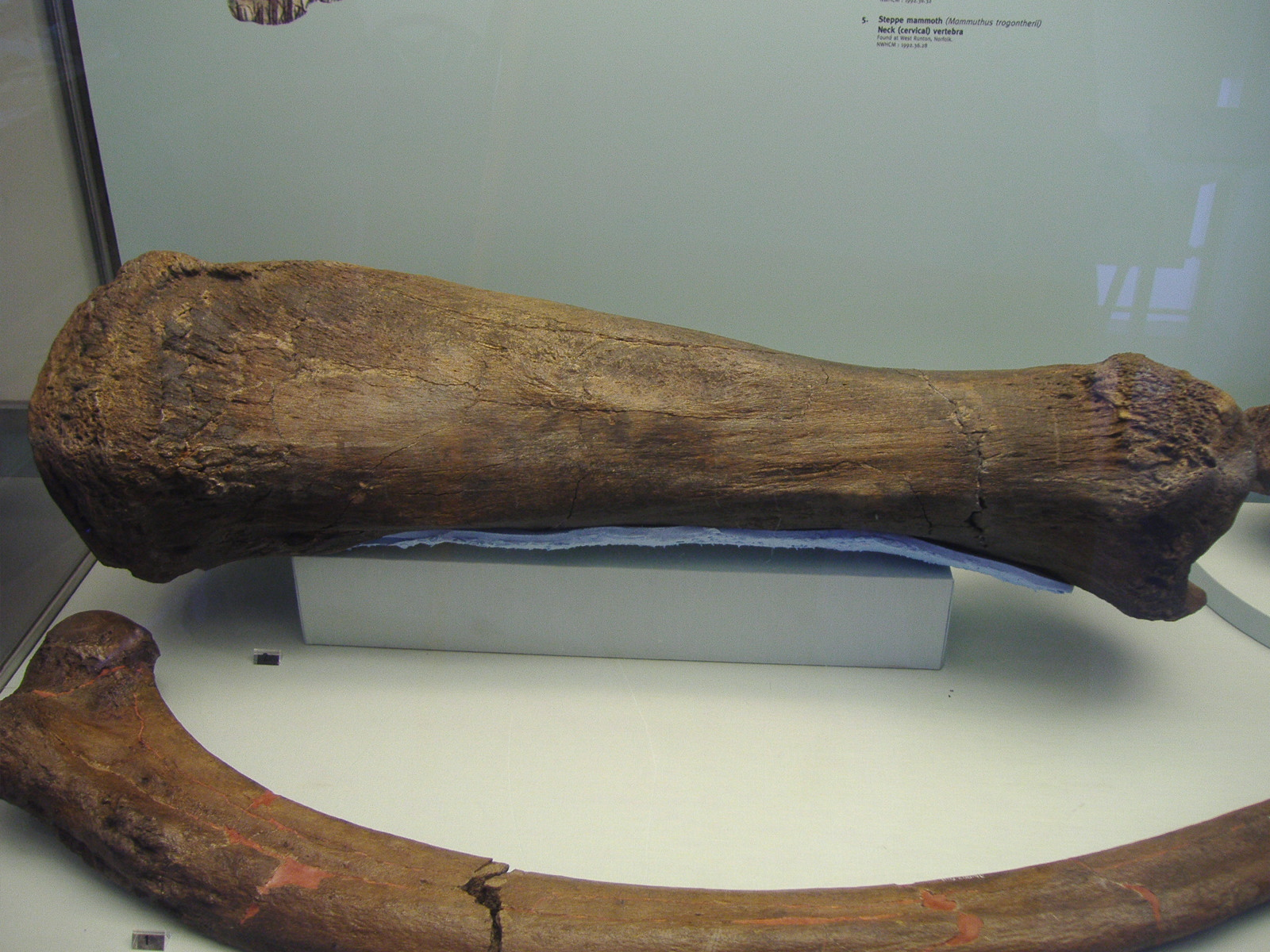
The lower rear leg (tibia) and a rib of the West Runton Mammoth exhibited at Cromer Museum

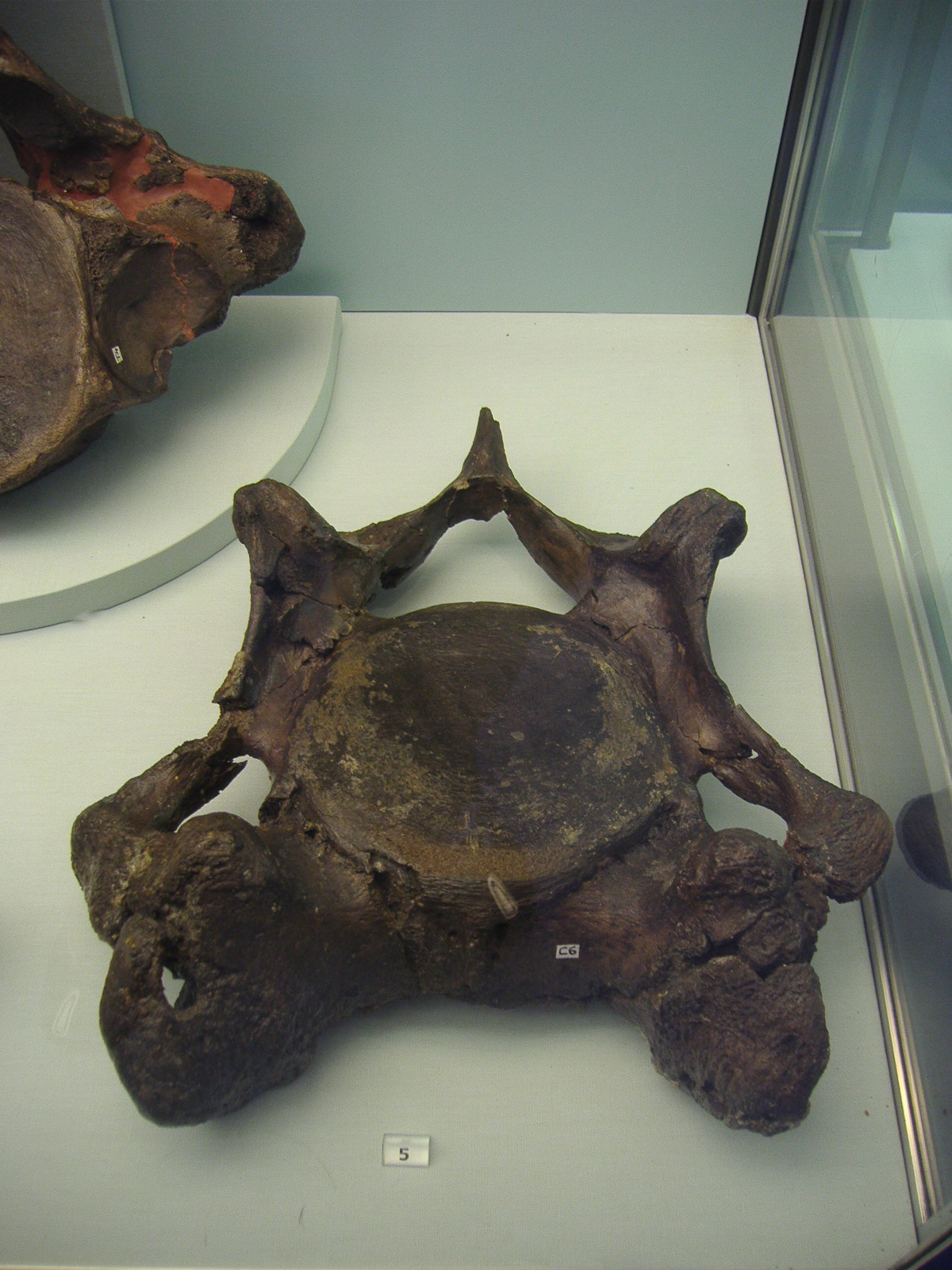
A neck vertebra of the West Runton Mammoth exhibited at Cromer Museum.

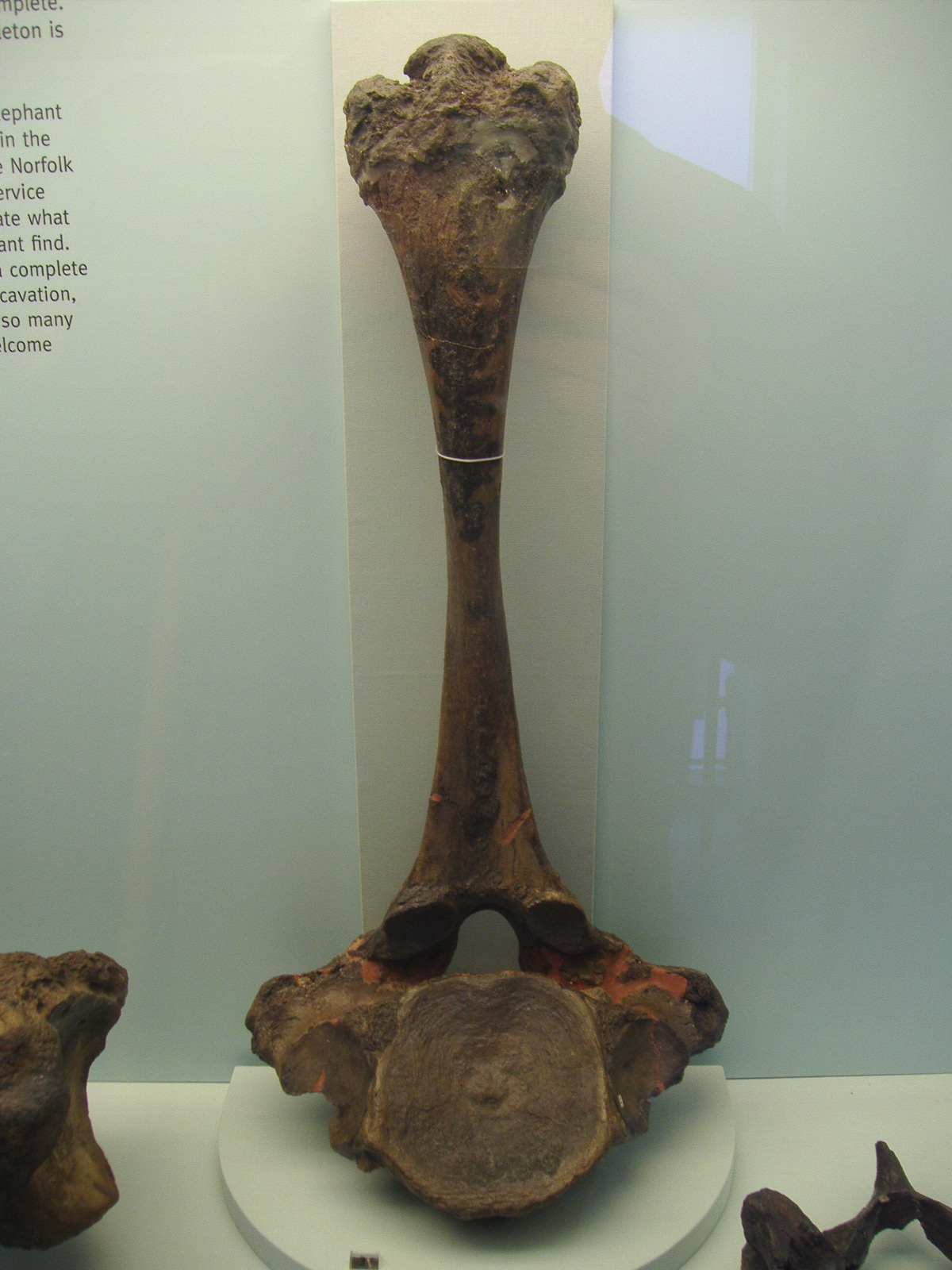
The upper back (thoracic) vertebra of the West Runton Mammoth exhibited at Cromer Museum.

== Further research ==
On 30 March 2011, it was reported in the news that researchers from the Universities of York and Manchester had successfully extracted protein from the bones of the West Runton Mammoth. Using an ultra-high resolution mass spectrometer, bio-archaeologists managed to produce a near complete collagen sequence. Previously it had not been believed possible to find any collagen in a skeleton going back some 600,000 years. The collagen sequencing was carried out at the Centre for Excellence in Mass Spectrometry at the University of York.

Although shorter peptides (chains of amino acids) have been allegedly reported from dinosaur fossils, this is arguably the oldest protein ever sequenced. This research formed part of a study into the sequencing of mammoths and mastodons. Despite the age of the fossil, sufficient peptides were obtained from the West Runton skeleton to identify it as part of the family Elephantidae, which includes elephants and mammoths.
