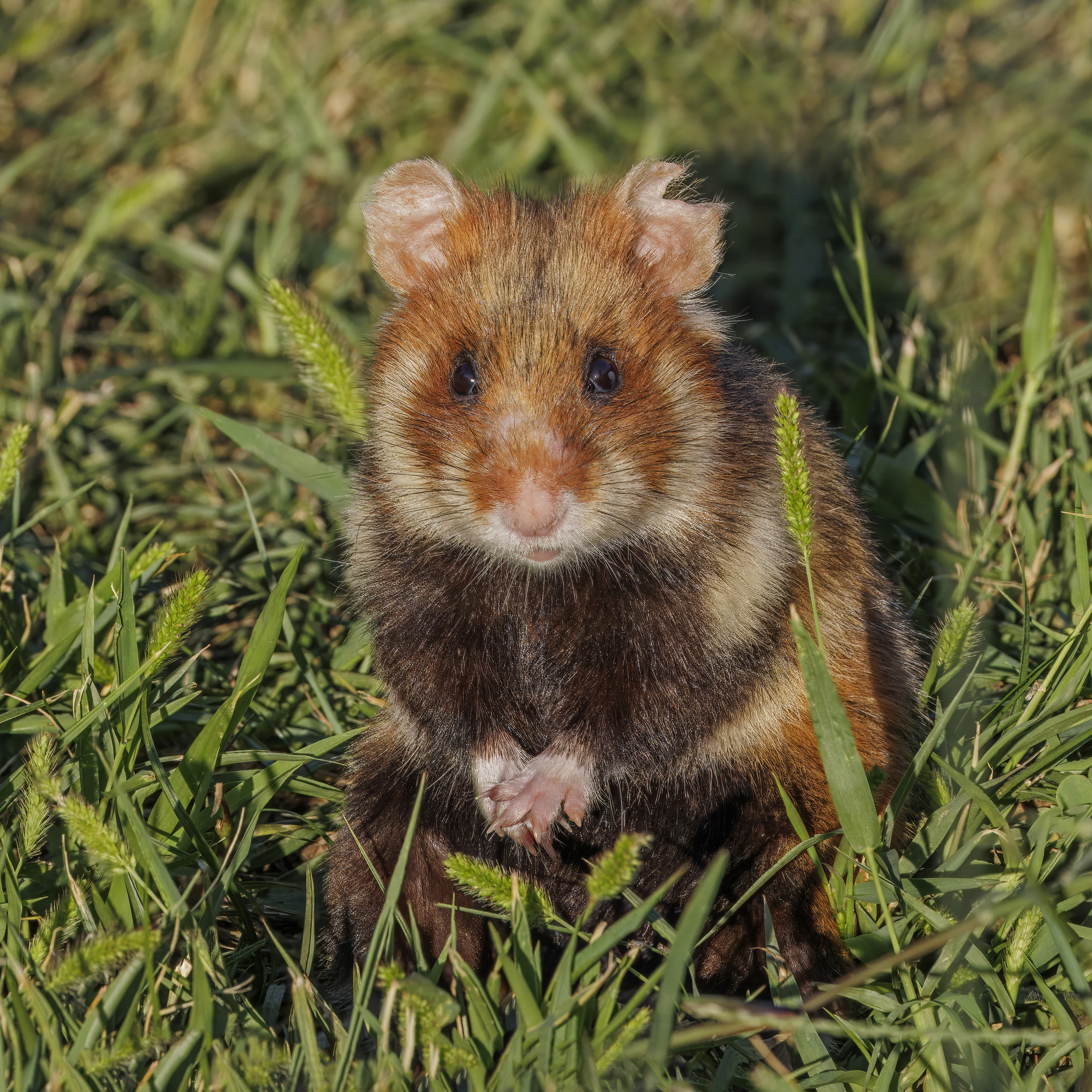
- In Meidling cemetery, Vienna

Conservation status
- Critically Endangered (IUCN 3.1)

Scientific classification
- Kingdom: Animalia
- Phylum: Chordata
- Class: Mammalia
- Order: Rodentia
- Family: Cricetidae
- Subfamily: Cricetinae
- Genus: Cricetus; Leske, 1779
- Species: C. cricetus

Binomial name
- Cricetus cricetus (Linnaeus, 1758)
- European hamster range (green)

Synonyms
- List: Cricetus albus Fitzinger, 1867; Cricetus babylonicus Nehring, 1903; Cricetus canescens Nehring, 1899; Cricetus frumentarius Pallas, 1811; Cricetus fulvus Bechstein, 1801; Cricetus fuscidorsis Argyropulo, 1932; Cricetus germanicus Kerr, 1792; Cricetus jeudii Gray, 1873; Cricetus latycranius Ognev, 1923; Cricetus nehringi Matschie, 1901; Cricetus niger Fitzinger, 1867; Cricetus nigricans Lacépède, 1799; Cricetus polychroma Krulikovski, 1916; Cricetus rufescens Nehring, 1899; Cricetus stavropolicus Satunin, 1907; Cricetus tauricus Ognev, 1924; Cricetus tomensis Ognev, 1924; Cricetus varius Fitzinger, 1867; Cricetus vulgaris Geoffroy, 1803; Mus cricetus Linnaeus, 1758

= European hamster =

European hamster Temporal range: Pleistocene–Recent

Species of hamster native to Eurasia

The European hamster (Cricetus cricetus), also known as the common hamster, is the only living species of hamster in the genus Cricetus. It is native to grassland and similar habitats in a large part of Eurasia, extending from Belgium to Xinjiang in China. Historically, it was considered a farmland pest and had been trapped for its fur. Its population has declined drastically in recent years and is now considered critically endangered. The main threats to the species are thought to be intensive agriculture, habitat destruction, and persecution by farmers.

== Description ==
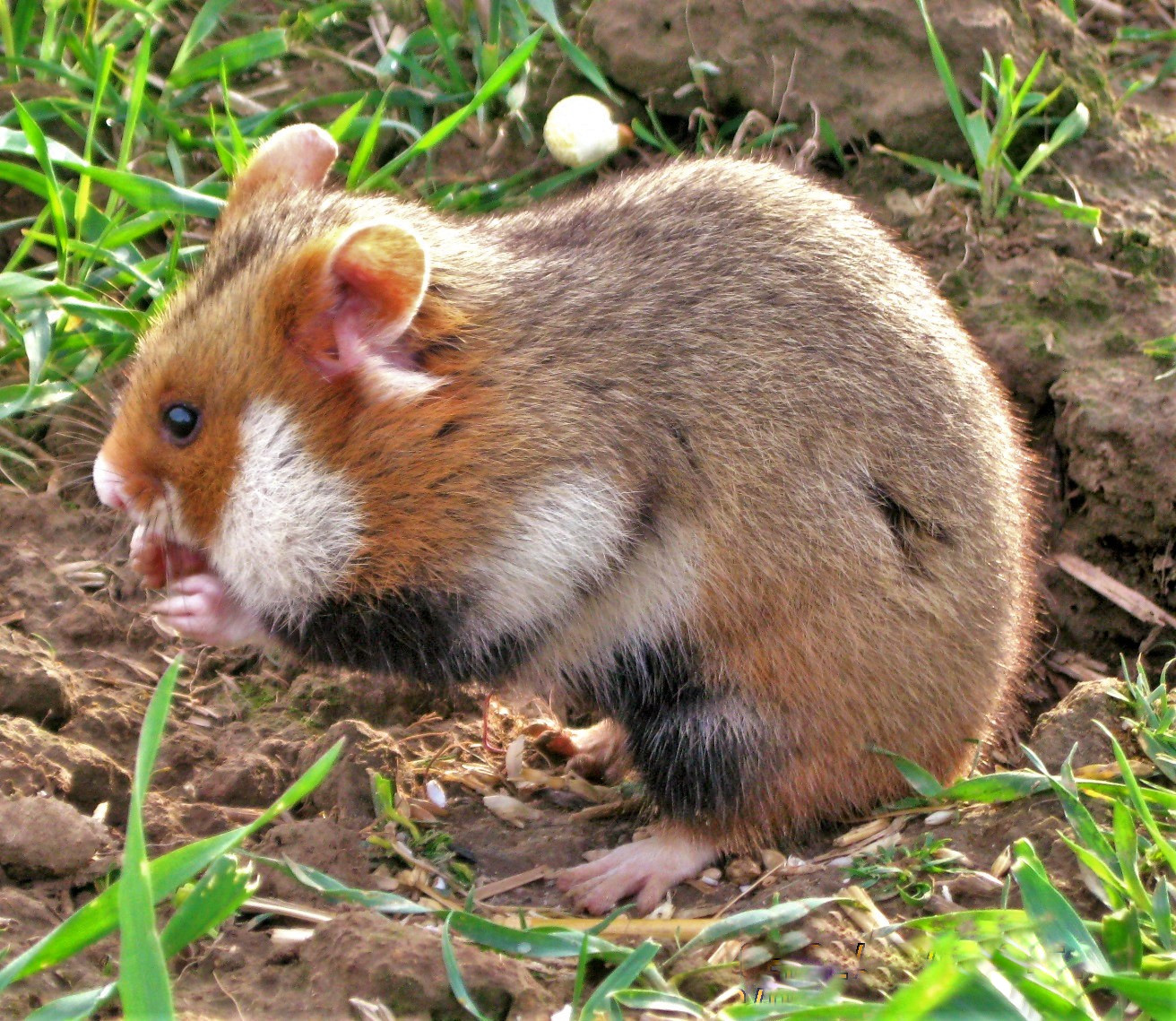
European hamster photographed in Poland

The European hamster is the largest living hamster, reaching up to 20 to 30 centimetres (7.9 to 11.8 in) in length, with a relatively short tail around 4–6 cm (1.6–2.4 in) long, with a body mass typically around 200 to 650 grams (7.1 to 22.9 oz), though exceptionally body masses of over 1 kg (2.2 lb) have been recorded. Males are generally somewhat larger and heavier than females. The colour of the body fur varies from being black on the belly, brown on the back, as well as white and cream on the nose, paws, cheeks, neck, and behind the forelimbs, with some rare colour variation being known. These polymorphisms cause colourations including white, albino, flavistic, red, sand, iron-gray, bicolor, piebald, dark, atypical, and true melanistic, with true melanistic being the most common and indicated by a very dark colour with patches of the normal colouration. The fur is moulted once per year.

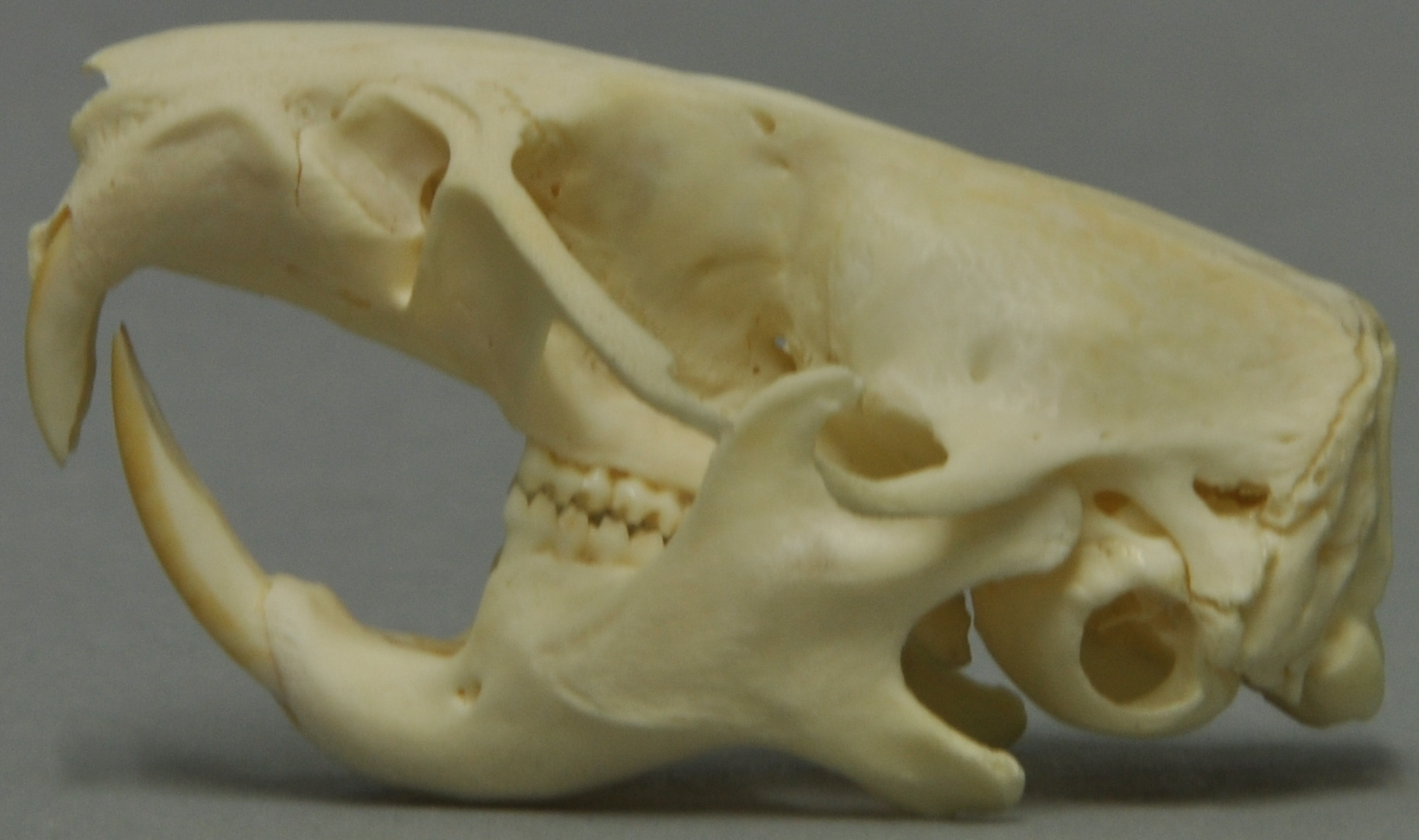
Skull of a European hamster

The upper lip has numerous whiskers each 3.2–6.5 centimetres (1.3–2.6 in) long, around 30 on each side in 4-5 rows, with additional whiskers including two above each eye, and a number of others on the upper forelimb (antebrachium). The snout is blunt, with the skull including the zygomatic arches being robustly constructed, while the lower jaw is slender, with the mandibular symphysis (the connection between the two halves of the lower jaws) being unossified, allowing each half of the lower jaw to move separately. The face has a pair of expandable cheek pouches. There is one pair of incisors and three pairs of molar teeth in both the upper and lower jaws. The lower incisors are longer than the upper incisors. The molar teeth are short (brachydont) and have rounded cusps (bunodont).

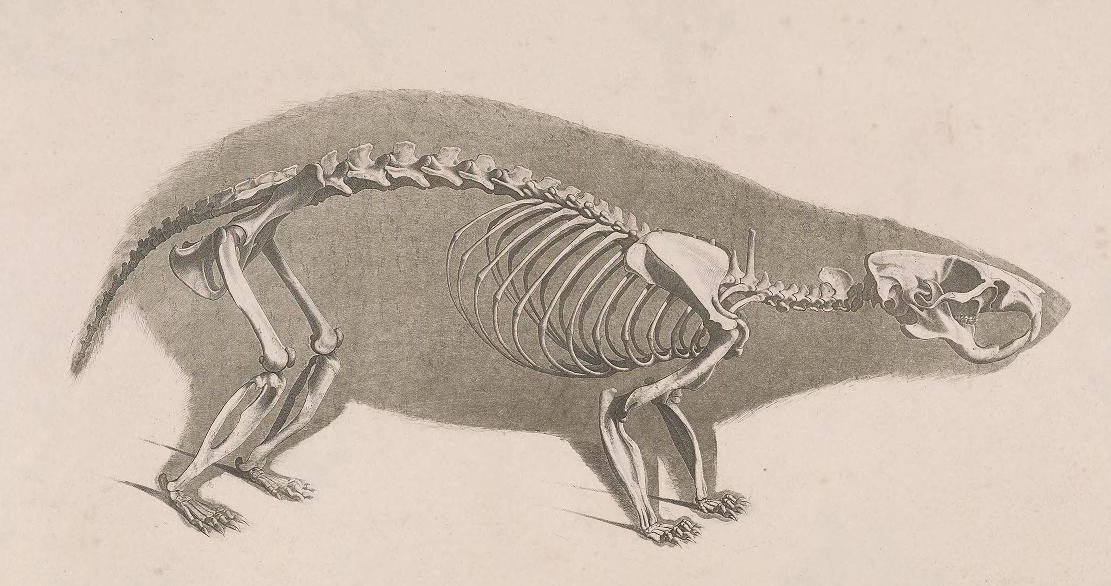
Skeleton

There are typically seven neck (cervical), four thoracic, three fused sacral and 17 tail (caudal) vertebrae, with the body having thirteen pairs of ribs. The body is stocky and the legs are proportionally short. The scapula is relatively thin and translucent in some areas. The lungs are asymmetrical, with the right lung larger than the left, with the right lung divided into lobes while the left is not. The male has a baculum (penis bone). The females have four pairs for a total of eight nipples. In the wild, female European hamsters generally live for 34 months (2 years 10 months) and up to 5 years, while males on average live for 31 months (2 years 7 months), and up to 4 years.

== Distribution and habitat ==
It is typically found in lowland areas with loam or loess-like soil and permeable bedrock below 500 metres (1,600 ft) altitude, naturally in relatively dry steppe or forest steppe like habitats though it also inhabits similar human-modified habitat such as crop fields, with some tolerance for boreal forest and semi-desert. It favours a continental climate. Food availability and reduced predator populations have caused increased migration to human-modified habitat, with over 75% of burrows located on agricultural land. It is now found from Belgium and Alsace in eastern France in the west, to Russia and northwest Xinjiang, in China in the east, and Bulgaria in the south, between 44°-59° N and the 5°-95° E. A significant population is found in Vienna Central Cemetery in Austria.

== Behaviour ==
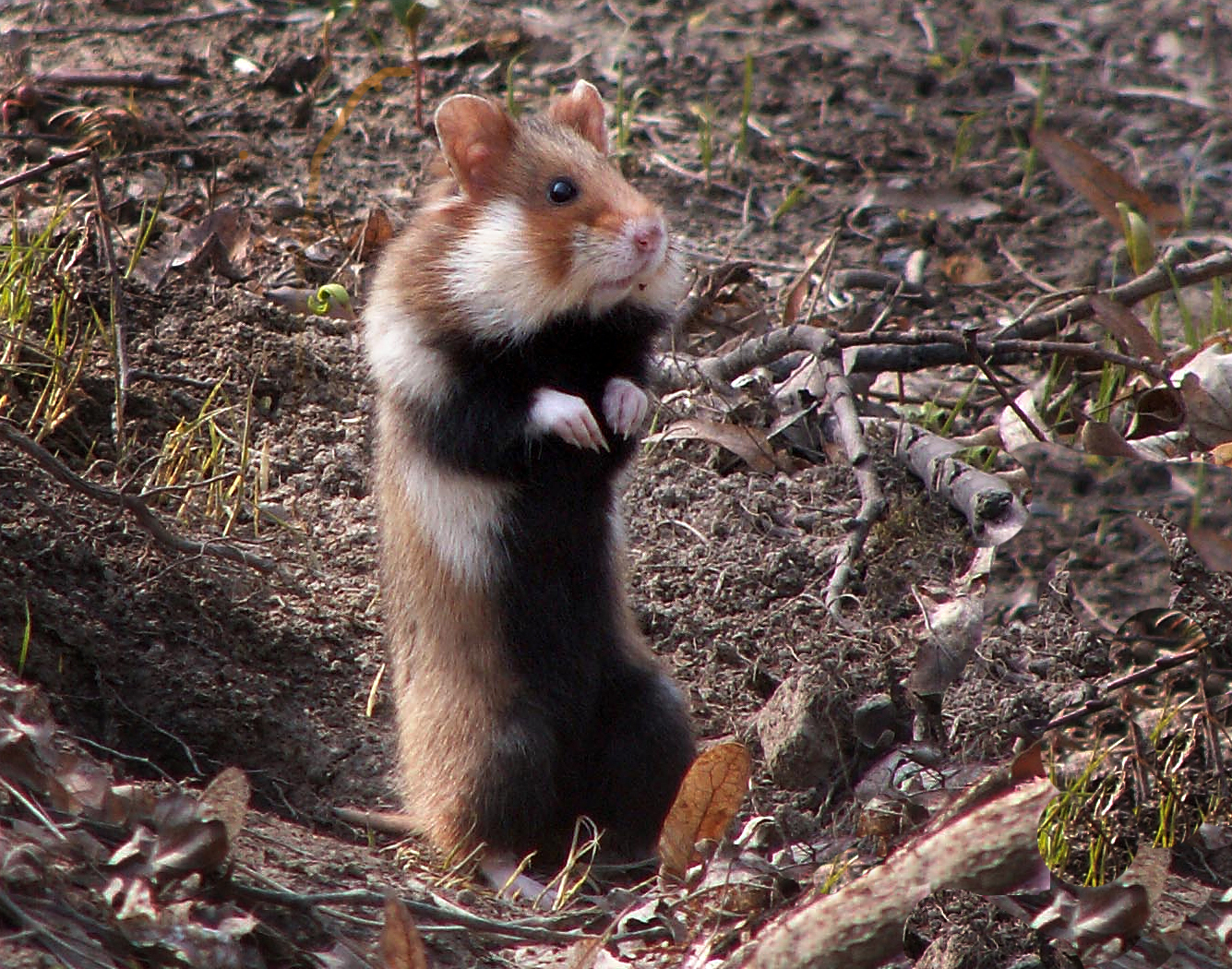
European hamster rearing on its hind legs in Vienna Central Cemetery

The common hamster is often described as a nocturnal or crepuscular species, but it is also known to sometimes be active during the daytime. It lives in a complex burrow system, with a main chamber generally being connected to the surface by both a diagonal and vertical tunnel, with offshoot tunnels being used to store food or to defecate, with a single European hamster utilizing multiple burrows over the course of an active season, with males using more (up to 10) burrows. The vast majority of its diet is herbivorous, comprising various vegetable matter including seeds, legumes, root vegetables and grasses, with a small part (10-13%) of its diet being from animal sources like earthworms, snails and insects. European hamsters sometimes engage in cannibalism, during stressed periods and/or times of high population density. European hamsters do not typically need to drink as they are generally capable of getting the necessary water from their diet alone. It transports its food in its elastic cheek pouches to the food storage chambers. The storage chambers may be quite large and on average contain 2–3 kg (4.4–6.6 lb) of food, but exceptionally can be up to 65 kg (143 lb). It hibernates between October and March. During this time, it wakes every five to seven days to feed from the storage chambers. They are usually solitary animals. They typically have home ranges from 0.2 hectares (0.0020 km^{2}) in females to 1.8 hectares (0.018 km^{2}) in males, with the home ranges of males typically encompassing the burrows of three or a greater number of females.

When threatened, the European hamster rears up onto its hind legs, exposing its black underside, raises its hands and makes loud noises in an attempt to intimidate its opponent.

=== Breeding ===
The breeding season of European hamsters lasts for about 5 months. European hamsters are polygamous, with the males having no involvement in parental care and attempting to mate with as many females as they can. Males are territorial and frequently fight other males over access to females. Sometimes, the same litter will have multiple (up to 3) fathers. In captivity, males generally prefer to mate with smaller females, while females prefer to mate with larger males. The species follows a r-selection life strategy, with early onset of sexual maturity and many offspring. Females reach sexual maturity at an age of 80 days, while males reach sexual maturity within 60 days, but generally do not breed until the year after their birth. Reproductively active males show descended testicles. The breeding period typically spans from April or May until August. Following mating, the vagina of females becomes sealed until the birth of the litter. Females generally produce two or occasionally three litters per breeding season, with each litter containing between 3 and 12 offspring. The gestation period is around 17–20 days for the first litter and sometimes up to 37 days for subsequent litters. Newborns are around 5 grams (0.18 oz), hairless and blind, with closed ears. They begin to consume non-milk food at 6 days of age. Hair grows within 5 days of birth, with eyes and ears opening 12 days after birth. Juveniles begin to leave the nest at around 25 days of age, with the parental bond disintegrating within three to five weeks of birth, with the mother moving on to a new burrow. Less than 20% of offspring typically survive into the following year.

== Predators ==
European hamsters are predated upon by various predators, including carnivorous mammals such as the least weasel (Mustela nivalis), stoat (Mustela erminea), polecat (Mustela putorius), pine marten (Martes foina), badger (Meles meles) and red fox (Vulpes vulpes), as well as predatory birds, including buzzard (Buteo buteo), red kite (Milvus milvus), black kite (Milvus migrans) and eagle owl (Bubo bubo). In areas where it is abundant, it can form up to 50% of the diet of some birds of prey.

== Evolution ==
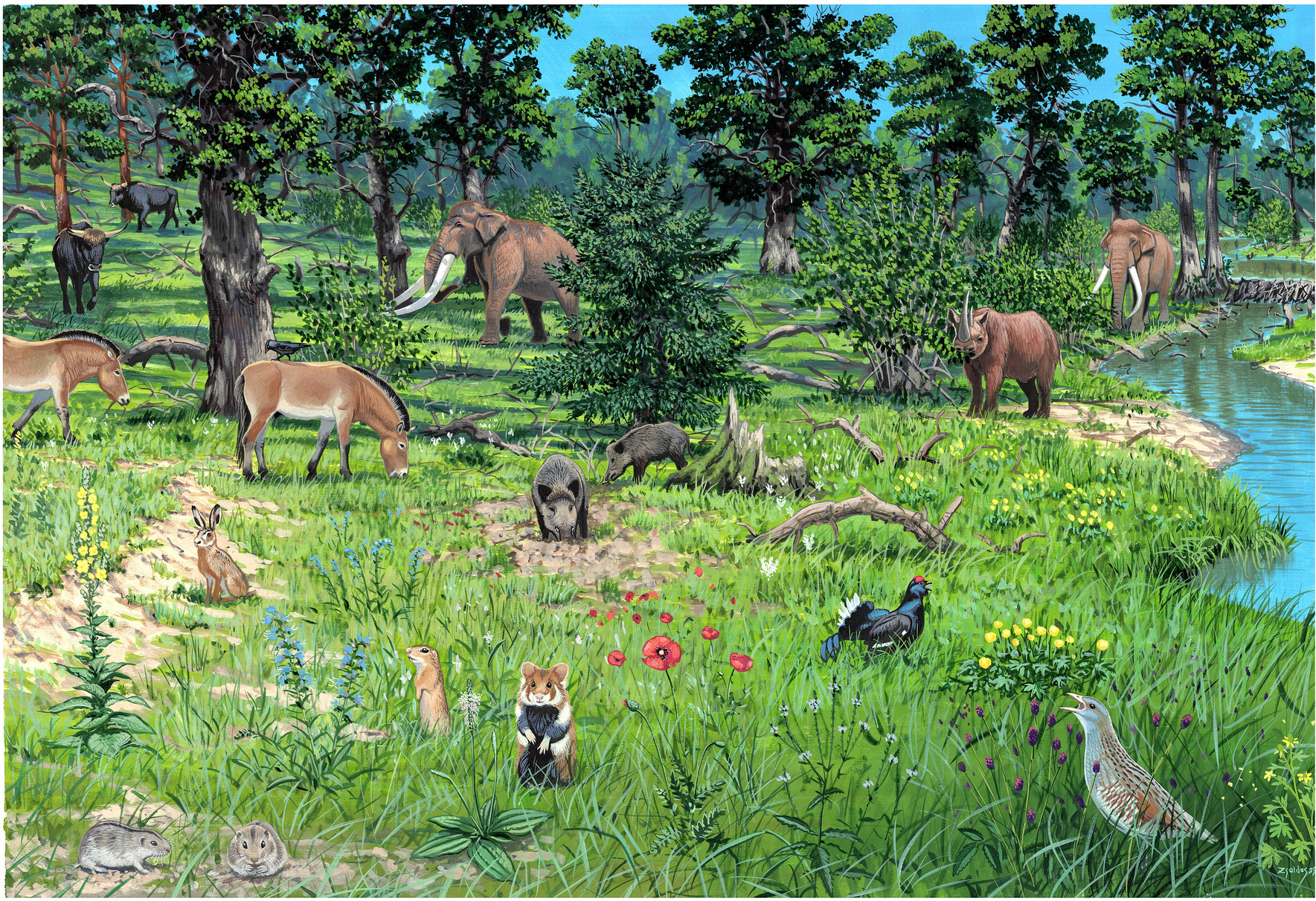
Landscape of Central Europe during the Last Interglacial (~130-115,000 years ago), featuring the European hamster (foreground) as well as straight-tusked elephants, Merck's rhinoceros, wild boar, wild horse, aurochs, western jackdaw, corn crake, black grouse, steppe lemming, the extinct ground squirrel Spermophilus citelloides and the European hare

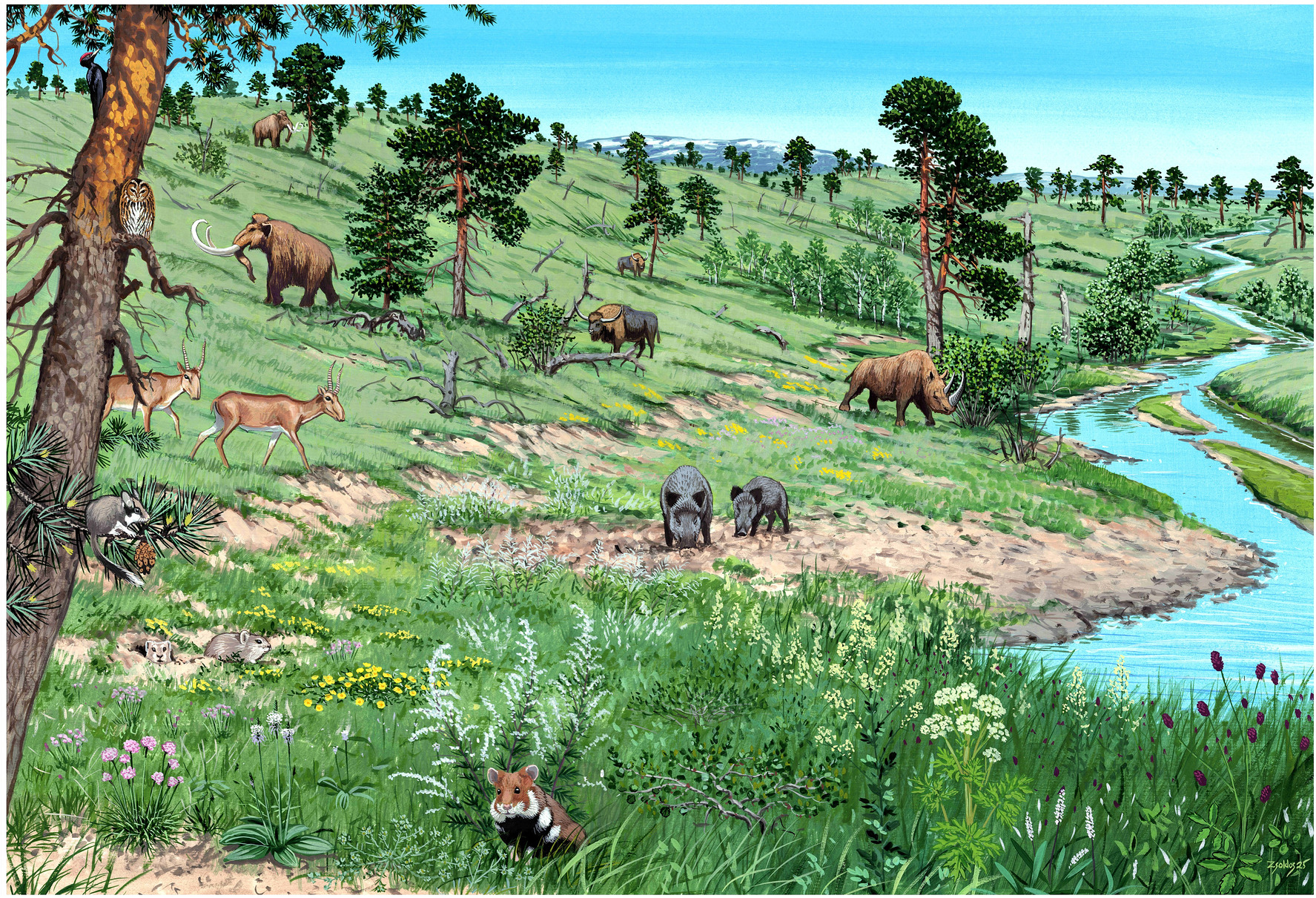
European hamster (foreground centre) in a Last Glacial Period Central European landscape scene, along with saiga antelope, woolly rhinoceros, woolly mammoth, steppe bison, wild boar, garden dormouse, black woodpecker and tawny owl.

The timing of the origin of the genus Cricetus is disputed, with different authors varying on the timing from the late Miocene to Early Pleistocene. The Miocene origin is based on the species "Cricetus" lophidens known from the latest Miocene-early Pliocene of Europe, but its relationship to Cricetus has been doubted by many authors. Authors also disagree on the timing of the origin of the modern species, varying from the Early Pleistocene to Late Pleistocene. Four Pleistocene species in the genus have been recognised: Cricetus major, Cricetus nanus, Cricetus praeglacialis and Cricetus runtonensis, but their validity is disputed and they are considered paleosubspecies of the European hamster by some authors, with some authors considering C. major and C. runtonensis to not be distinct from each other. Pleistocene Cricteus remains do not greatly differ from the living European hamster in (typically molar) morphology, but display a great amount of size variation due to considerable variance in climatic conditions throughout the period, with colder climate conditions corresponding with generally larger individuals in accordance with Bergmann's rule. Pleistocene Cricetus remains indicate the genus sometimes occupied areas outside its current range, including Britain (recorded in the early Middle Pleistocene aged West Runton Freshwater Bed of Norfolk and the late Middle Pleistocene of Tornewton Cave, Devon). The current population structure of living European hamsters is estimated to have formed during the Last Glacial Period, around 75-45,000 years ago, when it is suggested that the cold glacial climate conditions caused the European hamster population to divide into a number of isolated subpopulations that later reconnected at the onset of the Holocene.

== Conservation ==
Prior to the mid 20th century, European hamsters thrived in human-modified agricultural landscapes, where they were arguably more successful than they were in their natural grassland habitat. They were widely regarded as an agricultural pest and persecuted, as well as hunted for their fur. From the mid 20th century, however, their population has begun to decline. This decline is likely due to deterioration of natural habitats and quality of food supplies.

The Court of Justice of the European Union, the European Union's highest court, ruled in 2011 that France had failed to protect the European hamster. The government would be subject to fines of up to $24.6 million if France did not adjust its agricultural and urbanisation policies sufficiently to protect it. By 2014, France had started a captive-breeding programme, which aimed to release 500 European hamsters each year into fields that farmers were paid not to harvest.

In 2020, the European hamster was classified as critically endangered across its global range on the IUCN Red List. The reasons for its drastic decline are not fully understood. It has been linked especially to habitat loss due to intensive agricultural practices and the building of roads that fragment populations, and to climate change, the historical fur trapping and to pollution; even light pollution appears to significantly reduce local populations, unless counterbalanced by other factors. Agriculture, development, and persecution are thought to be the biggest threats to the species. Dependence on fields and crops has shortened cover for breeding as crops are sown in the winter rather than spring, leading to less cover from predators during breeding season. The crops themselves serve as the primary food source for hamsters, yet an increase in monoculture and pesticide use has decreased the overall variety within the hamster's diet, leading to a lack of vitamins and protein deficiency that harms health, growth, and development. The population is further harmed by rapidly changing weather and climate patterns. Winters are becoming milder and are often followed by a swift drop in temperatures, leading to food sources being depleted if there is not adequate time to store food the preceding spring and populations freezing. These effects are exacerbated by a lack of adequate snow cover following a mild spring, an extreme issue as hamsters use this snow cover to insulate their burrows.

Conservation efforts include breeding programs, farmer compensation for leaving fields unharvested during breeding season, and the creation of habitat corridors to connect areas fragmented by roads and buildings.

A significant benefit to existing conservation programs is that the European hamster breeds readily in captivity; captive breeding programs for the species exist in Belgium, France, Germany, Poland, Ukraine and elsewhere. The European hamster has sometimes been bred to be used as a model organism. However, such breeding programs result in issues as the released animals are likely to spend more time outside their burrows, locate human voices to beg for food, and show less fear towards natural predators. This highlights the negative impact that human populations have had on the species, as humans drive down hamster populations and have difficulty effectively introducing members to remedy this.
