= West Runton =

Village in Norfolk, England

Coordinates: 52.93772°N 1.24405°E

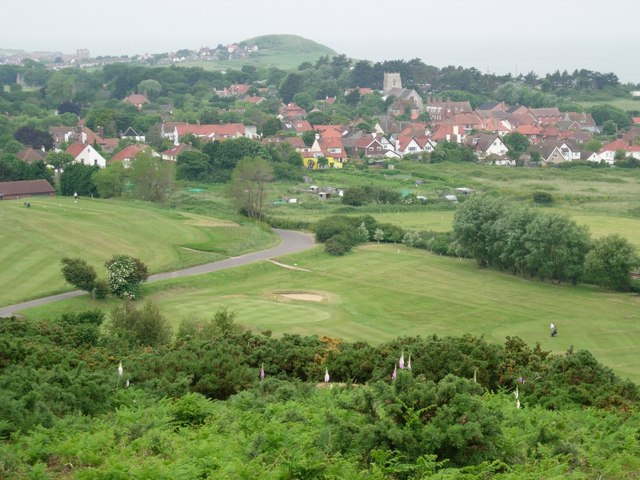
- West Runton from Incleborough Hill. With Beeston Bump in background

- Location within Norfolk
- Population: 1,633 (parish, 2001 census)
  - Density: 300 / km² (778 / sq mi)
- OS grid reference: TG180427
- Civil parish: Runton
- District: North Norfolk
- Shire county: Norfolk
- Region: East
- Country: England
- Sovereign state: United Kingdom
- Post town: Cromer
- Postcode district: NR27
- Dialling code: 01263
- Police: Norfolk
- Fire: Norfolk
- Ambulance: East of England
- UK Parliament: North Norfolk

West Runton is a village in North Norfolk, England, on the North Sea coast. West Runton and East Runton together form the parish of Runton. The village straddles the A149 North Norfolk coast road and is 2 1/2 miles west of Cromer and 1 1/2 miles east of Sheringham.

== Toponymy ==
The villages name means either, Runa's farm/settlement' or 'Runi's farm/settlement'.

== History ==
Fossils of animals, birds and insects are regularly exposed from the eroding cliffs on the beach. The cliffs of West Runton were once part of the Cromer Forest Bed formation which is exposed at intervals along the coast of Norfolk and Suffolk, from Weybourne to Kessingland. The forest bed was formed in the Quaternary Period and dates to between 700,000 and 500,000 years ago.

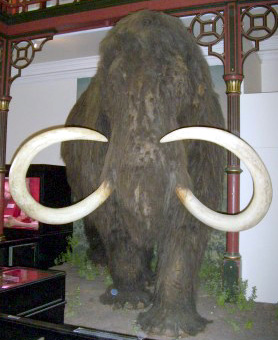
A mammoth; this example is from an Ipswich museum.

West Runton's most famous fossil from that period is the "*West Runton elephant". In 1990 the fossilised remains were first discovered down on the beach after winter seas had eroded the cliff. By 1992 at least 25% of the elephant's skeleton had been recovered, and then in 1995 the Norfolk Archaeological unit, with a grant from the National Lottery and some commercial sponsorship, managed to recover almost the entire skeleton. The archaeologists were able to learn from the fossil that the elephant was a mammoth (Mammuthus trogontherii) and male, stood about 4 metres high, and weighed about 10 tonnes. He was about 40 years old when he probably got stuck in a shallow swampy river channel. His carcass was scavenged by Hyenas, as their teeth marks were found on some of his bones. The mammoth's remains have now been preserved and it is planned to return them to the village for future display. It is currently being prepared for display in Norwich Castle Museum.

Evidence of early antiquity in West Runton is scant. However, evidence of Roman habitation were found just south of the village up on Beeston Regis Heath in 1859, when a complete set of quern-stones were found dating from Roman times. Quern-stones were used to grind materials, the most important of which was usually grain to make flour for bread-making. Up on Beeston Regis Heath there can be found circular pits called "Hills and Holes" (from the 1st edition of the Ordnance Survey map of the area), which are thought to date from prehistoric times. During the Saxon-Norman to Medieval periods these pits were dug to obtain iron ore, which was then smelted in a furnace to produce iron. In the Domesday Book, the settlement of Runton is given the name of Rugutune and Runetune.

== Wildlife ==
The soft cliffs at West Runton are of national importance for the conservation of rare beetles and other invertebrates. The soft geology of the cliffs is ideal for burrowing insects including the rare rove beetle Bledius filipes. This beetle is only known in the UK from a handful of Norfolk soft cliff sites, West Runton is thought to be a stronghold for this species. Other rare species recorded at West Runton cliffs include the cliff comber beetle Nebria livida, a nocturnal species found only on soft cliffs in Norfolk and Yorkshire.

== Paramoudra and flint circles ==
On the beach near West Runton can be found giant flint formations known as paramoudra and also flint circles. Paramoudras are large flint stones resembling a doughnut or a backbone. In Norfolk paramoudras are better known as pot stones. Flint circles are even stranger formations usually consisting of a large round flint rim or rind with chalk filling in the middle.

== War memorial ==
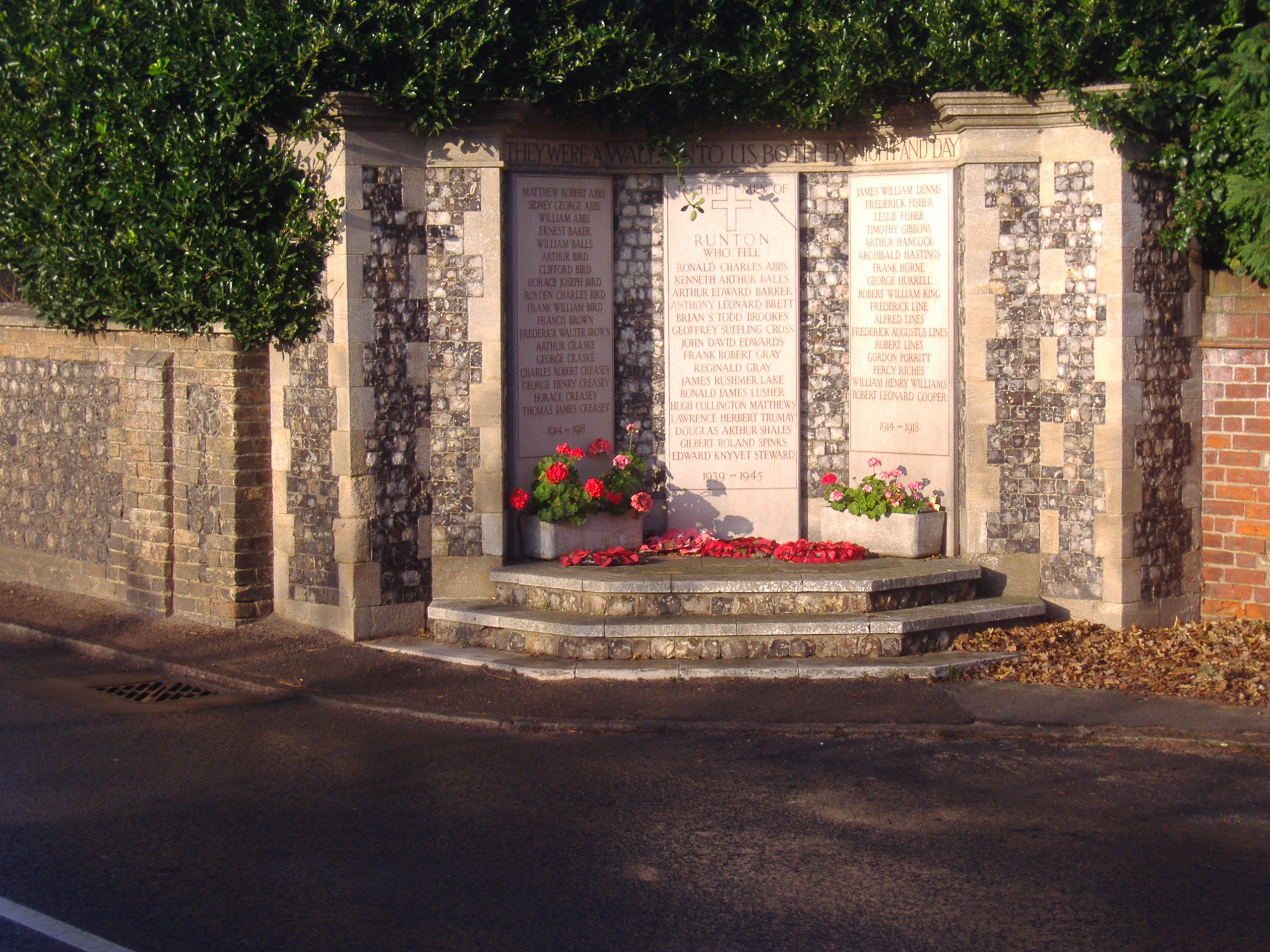
Memorial to the fallen of Runton

The war memorial is constructed of stone and flint and is built into the southern perimeter wall of the Parish Church of the Holy Trinity. There are three tablets set into the front. Three steps lead up to the memorial and flower troughs sit at the foot of the World War I tablets. It stands right on the verge of the A149 and is quite precarious for anyone taking a visit to the memorial. The inscription above the tablets reads "They were a wall unto us both by night and day" (Bible: 1 Kings, (1 Samuel), Chapter 25, verse 16) and also "To the Men of Runton who fell". There are a total of 37 names on the tablets.

== Amenities ==
The village is served by several public transport routes, with a bus service to Norwich, Cromer and Sheringham, and a Greater Anglia rail service from station, where the Bittern Line runs a frequent service between Norwich, Cromer and Sheringham. There are several shops in the village which include a post office/village store, café, furniture upholsterer, hand car wash and a fancy dress/costume shop.

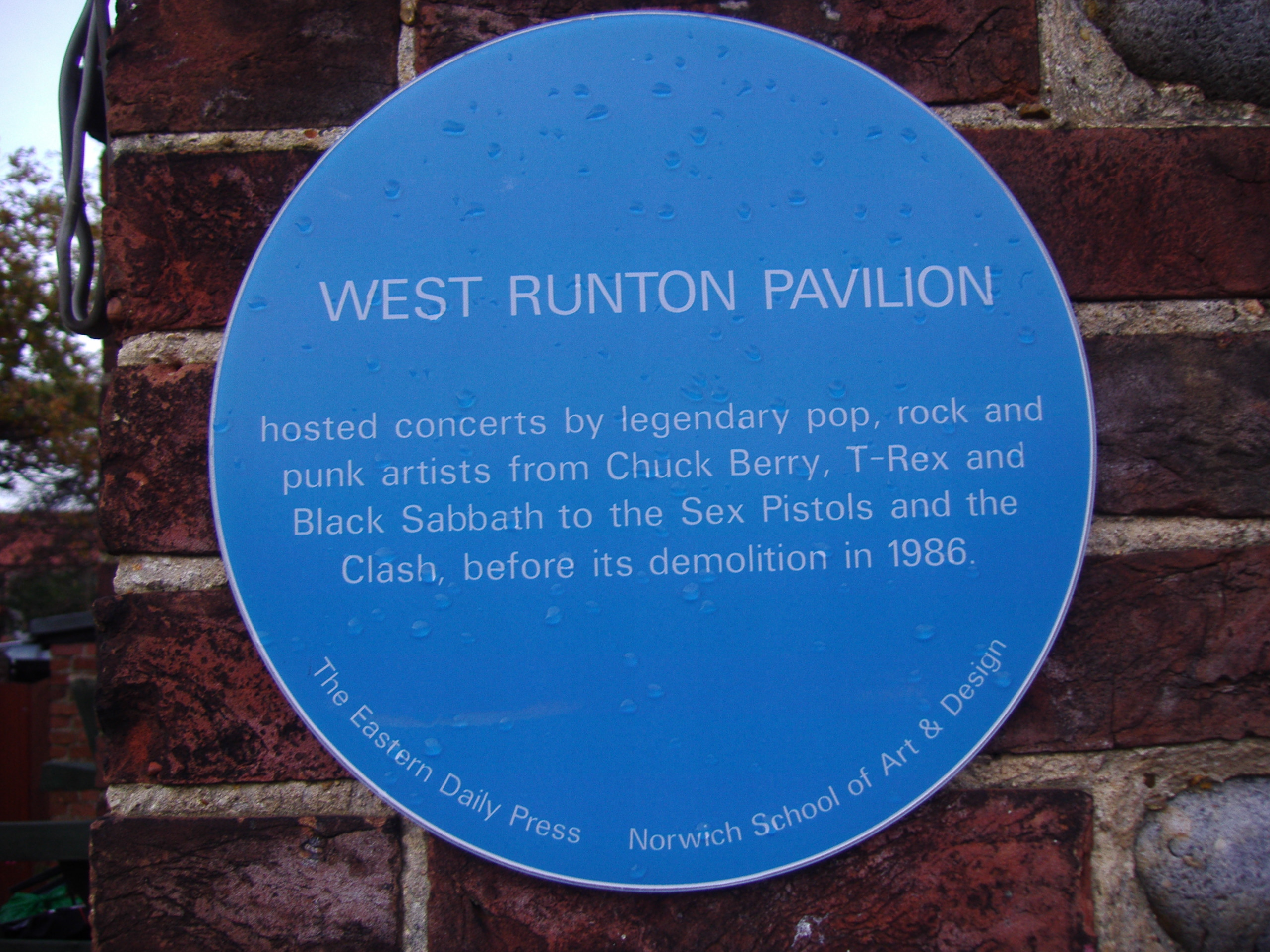
The blue plaque recalling the Pavilion

The pub, called the "Village Inn", has a blue plaque on the wall that recalls a concert played at the now-demolished pavilion by the Punk band the Sex Pistols. There are two restaurants in the inn, but it does not offer accommodation. However, facilities are available for camping and caravanning. A noteworthy attraction of the village is "The Links", a famous golf course designed by J.H. Taylor around the turn of the 20th century. Hillside Animal Sanctuary operates a site for animal rescue at West Runton, formerly occupied by the Norfolk Shire Horse Centre.

Another amenity of the village is Kingswood, situated in the former Runton Hill School, a girls' private boarding school set in pine-fringed grounds. Its former pupils include the Duchess of Kent. Kingswood is an educational activity centre which hosts residential school trips and educational visits throughout the year, and a variety of programmes are available for key stage 2 and 3 students.

Sea defences at West Runton consist of revetments, angled sea wall and a rather prominent wooden groyne stretching out to sea. This does slow down the process of longshore drift but is used mainly as a wave break so the boats can enter the sea more easily.

=== West Runton Pavilion ===
West Runton Pavilion and Cromer Royal Links Pavilion were two music venues on the North Norfolk coast. In their heyday they hosted concerts by many of the top rock bands and performers of the time. West Runton Pavilion in the mid-seventies hosted appearances by bands such as the Glitter Band and Kenny and the Rubettes. Then, as punk became popular, The Sex Pistols, The Damned, The Clash, Joy Division, Iggy Pop and The Jam appeared, as well as new wave of British heavy metal bands such as Saxon, Iron Maiden and Magnum. Veteran performers such as Motörhead, Ian Gillan, Ozzy Osbourne, Slade and many more continued to appear until 1983, when the last gig took place.

Memories of performances at the two Pavilions, together with details of dates, set-lists, line-ups, hit records and 48 pages of photos, have been brought together in a book written by Julie Fielder entitled 'What Flo Said' - a reference to the pot-bellied rock monster (designed by Ian Foster) which appeared for many years in the adverts for Cromer Links.

== Notable people ==
- Craig Murray, the former British Ambassador to Uzbekistan was born in the village.
- Katharine, Duchess of Kent was a pupil at Runton Hill School.
- Ian Wallace, opera singer, is buried in Holy Trinity churchyard.
