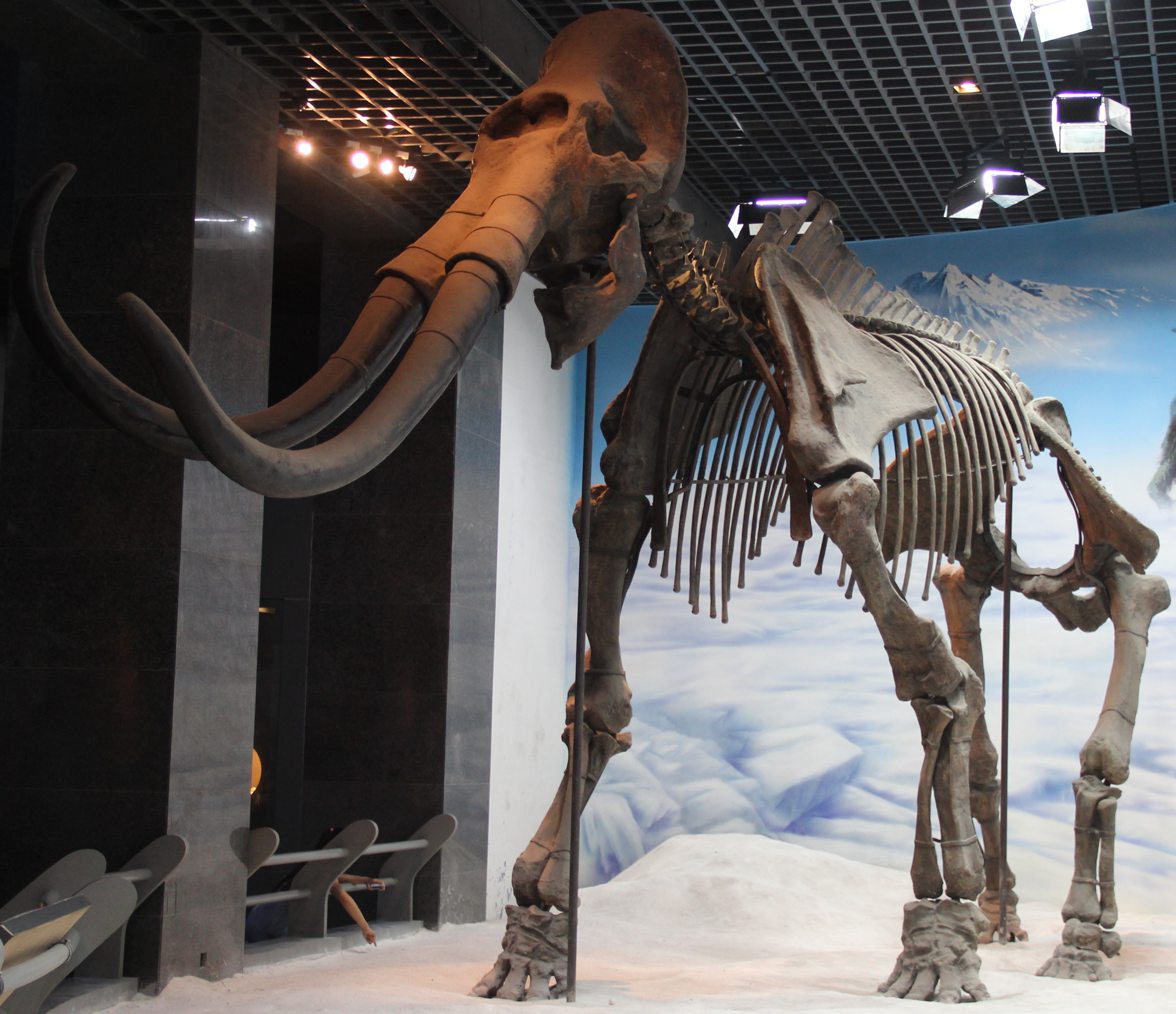
- Skeleton at the Inner Mongolia Museum, China

Scientific classification
- Kingdom: Animalia
- Phylum: Chordata
- Class: Mammalia
- Order: Proboscidea
- Family: Elephantidae
- Genus: †Mammuthus
- Species: †M. trogontherii

Binomial name
- †Mammuthus trogontherii (Pohlig, 1885)

Synonyms
- Mammuthus armeniacus Falconer, 1857; Elephas trogontherii Pohlig, 1885; Euelephas protomammonteus Matsumoto, 1924; Mammuthus protomammonteus (Matsumoto, 1924); Mammuthus sungari Zhou, 1959; Mammuthus trogontherii chosaricus Dubrovo, 1966

= Steppe mammoth =

Steppe mammoth Temporal range: Early (Calabrian) to Middle Pleistocene 1.7–0.2 Ma Possible Late Pleistocene records

Extinct species of mammoth

Mammuthus trogontherii, commonly called the steppe mammoth, is an extinct species of mammoth that ranged over most of northern Eurasia during the Early and Middle Pleistocene, approximately 1.7 million to 200,000 years ago. The evolution of the steppe mammoth marked the initial adaptation of the mammoth lineage towards cold environments, with the species probably being covered in a layer of fur. One of the largest mammoth species, it evolved in East Asia during the Early Pleistocene, around 1.7 million years ago, before migrating into North America around 1.3 million years ago, and into Europe during the Early/Middle Pleistocene transition, around 1 to 0.7 million years ago (replacing the earlier mammoth species Mammuthus meridionalis). It was the ancestor of the woolly mammoth, Columbian mammoth and dwarf Sardinian mammoth of the later Pleistocene. In Europe, its range overlapped with that of the temperate adapted straight-tusked elephant (Palaeoloxodon antiquus), with steppe mammoths and straight-tusked elephants generally alternately occupying northern Europe during glacial periods and interglacials, respectively, though at rare intervals they lived alongside each other at some locations.

== Taxonomy ==
There was historically confusion about the correct scientific name for the steppe mammoth, between Mammuthus armeniacus, named by Hugh Falconer in 1857, and Mammuthus trogontherii, named by Hans Pohlig in 1885. Falconer described M. armeniacus (as Elephas armeniacus) based on molar teeth collected from near Erzurum in eastern Turkey, of uncertain age, while Pohlig described M. trogontherii (as Elephas trogontherii) from fossil remains found in Europe. A first taxonomical overhaul was done by Maglio (1973) who decided that both names were synonyms, armeniacus being the older, hence the preferred name. However, Shoshani & Tassy (1996) recommended abandoning the name M. armeniacus for the steppe mammoth and returning to M. trogontherii despite its more recent description, on the grounds of stability (M. trogontherii having been more widely used in the literature for the steppe mammoth), as well as the sparse, fragmentary, and uncertainly-dated nature of the original M. armeniacus fossils (in contrast to M. trogontherii, described from a site with many additional well-preserved fossils of the species and at the heart of its range). Furthermore, due the poor preservation of the Erzurum M. armeniacus material, questions have been raised about whether the two names even pertain to the same taxon (with the fossils from the type locality of M. armeniacus potentially belonging not to the widespread steppe mammoth, but instead to a western population of Elephas maximus). Most recent authors have supported using the name M. trogontherii rather than M. armeniacus for the steppe mammoth. The type specimens of M. trogontherii are molars from the Süssenborn (also spelled Süßenborn) locality in Germany, dating to the early Middle Pleistocene (Marine Isotope Stage/MIS 16, approximately 676-621,000 years ago).

Several Early Pleistocene Japanese mammoth species and subspecies (including Mammuthus protomammonteus, Mammuthus paramammonteus shigensis, Mammuthus meridionalis shigensis and Mammuthus meridionalis proximus) are now thought to be synonyms of M. trogontherii. The species M. sungari, named by Zhou (1959) from specimens found in Zalainuoer, Inner Mongolia, China, and formerly widely used for mammoths in China, is now also recognised as a synonym for M. trogontherii.

Analysis of ancient DNA showing deep genetic divergences between early steppe-like mammoths in Siberia, dating around one million years ago, has led to questions about what material should be attributed to the species. In a 2024 review, Adrian Lister and Love Dalén argued that the species should be retained for now in a broad morphospecies sense for mammoth remains found across Eurasia spanning both the Early and Middle Pleistocene.

== Description ==
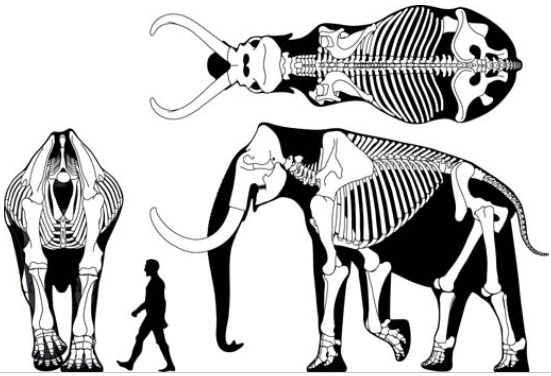
Skeletal diagram of the 3.89 metres (12.8 ft) tall Zhalainuoer III steppe mammoth, including side on view (centre), top-down (above) and from the front minus the head (left), compared to a 1.8 metres (5 ft 11 in) tall human

Mammuthus trogontherii was one of the largest mammoth species, with males on average being about 4 m (13.1 ft) tall at the shoulders and about 11 tonnes (24,000 lb) in weight and females on average being about 3.7 m (12.1 ft) tall at the shoulders and about 9.5 tonnes (21,000 lb) in weight, considerably exceeding the size of modern elephants. A largely complete specimen (Zhalainuoer III) from Inner Mongolia, China, was estimated to have had a shoulder height of around 3.69 m (12.1 ft) measured at the top of the scapula, which represents a flesh shoulder height of 3.89 m (12.8 ft), with a body mass estimated via volumetric analysis at 10.4 tonnes (23,000 lb). A larger bull, (Azov I), estimated to be 3.96 m (13.0 ft) tall at the shoulder (previously erroneously estimated as 4.5 m (15 ft) due to incorrect mounting) was estimated to weigh 11.5 tonnes (25,000 lb) via volumetric analysis.

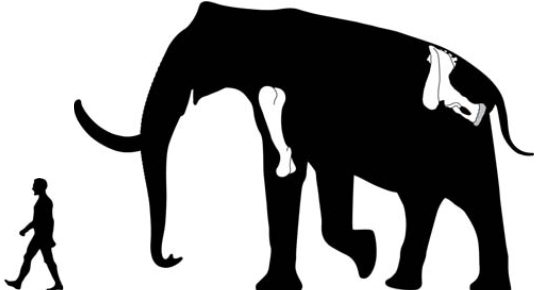
Size comparison of the fragmentary "Mosbach mammoth" estimated to have been 4.5 metres (15 ft) tall, compared to a 1.8 metres (5 ft 11 in) tall human.

Another individual represented by a single giant humerus 1.46 m (4.8 ft) long and an associated pelvis found in Mosbach Sande, Germany, is estimated to have had a shoulder height of 4.5 metres (14.8 ft) and a weight of 14.3 tonnes (32,000 lb) via regression analysis. Steppe mammoths from the late Middle Pleistocene of Europe were considerably smaller than these "typical" M. trogontherii specimens, with the smallest M. trogontherii population being from Stanton Harcourt, Oxfordshire, England, dating to MIS 7 (around 200,000 years ago), among the last records of the species in Europe, which have an estimated shoulder height of only 2.1–2.9 m (6.9–9.5 ft).

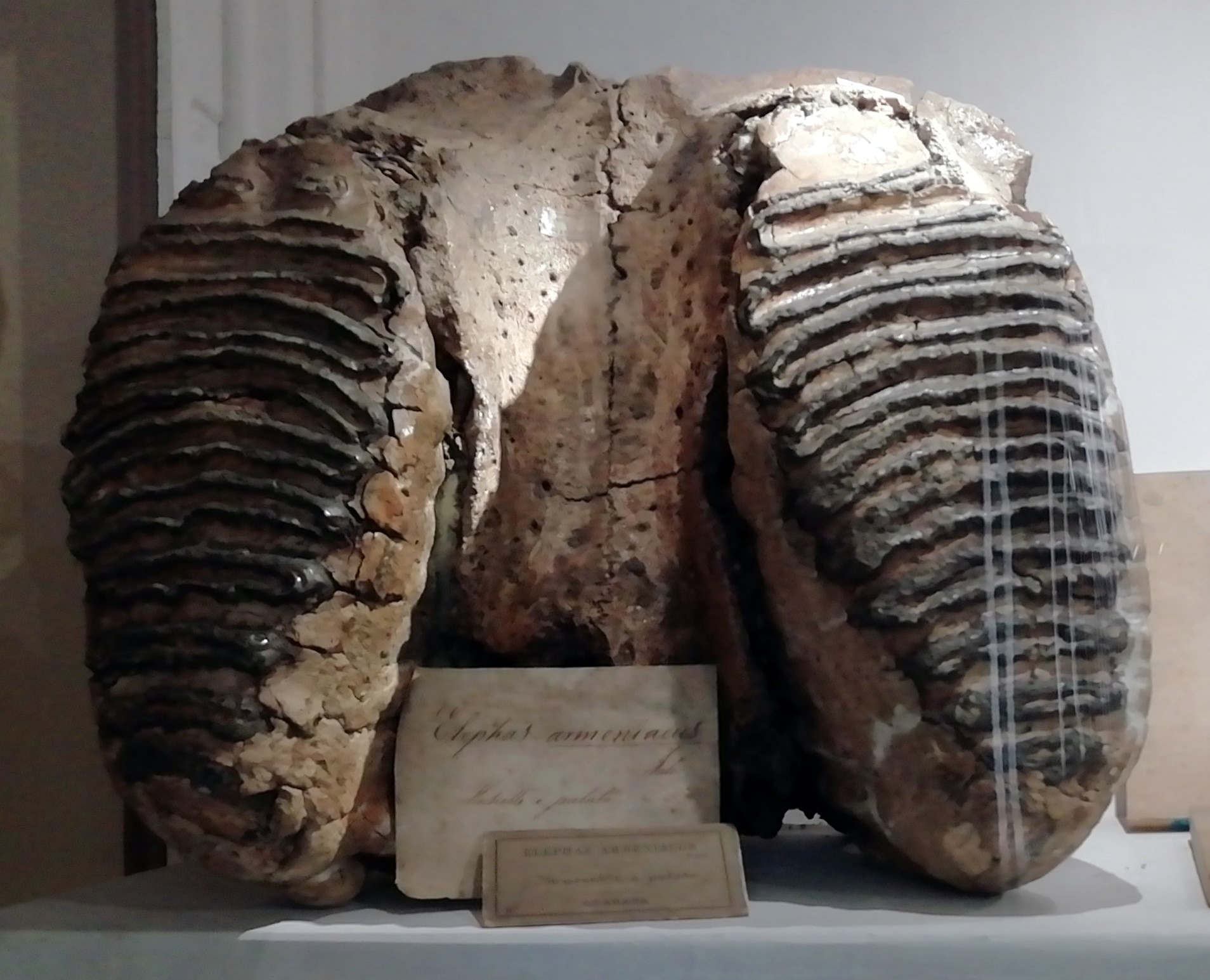
Jaw with molar teeth

The skull was high-domed and short, and bore twisted tusks. The lower jaw was short and deep. The number of lamellae/plates on the third molars is around 18–22, significantly higher than the number in earlier mammoth species, but noticeably lower than the number typically present in woolly mammoths (M. primigenius), though some European specimens of M. primigenius have counts which overlap with those of M. trogontherii. Compared to M. primigenius, the teeth of calves of M. trogontherii were proportionally larger. The body has around 19 thoracic vertebrae and 5 or 6 sacral vertebrae, with the first few thoracic vertebrae having long neural spines. The tusks were proportionally large, among the largest known among proboscideans, with one large tusk from the Kostolac Basin in Serbia measuring 4.2 metres (14 ft) in length, with an estimated mass of 213 kilograms (470 lb).

Sequenced genomes suggests that Early Pleistocene M. trogontherii specimens from Siberia, around 1 million years old, had already developed many of the genetic changes thought to be responsible for traits that were adaptations for living in cold environments characteristic of woolly mammoths. Due to the cold climates it inhabited and short tail, Mammuthus trogontherii is suggested to have borne a coat of fur, which was probably somewhat thinner than that of the woolly mammoth.

== Distribution and habitat ==
Fossils of M. trogontherii are known from across northern Eurasia, spanning from Western Europe to Eastern Asia, and into the high latitudes of Northern Asia. Among the southernmost records of the species are from Taiwan and Miyako Island in the Ryukyu Islands, dating to around 700-500,000 years ago. The species is notably absent from adjacent mainland Southern China. Steppe mammoths were often associated with cold open steppe environments, as its common name would suggest, but was not confined to them, as evidenced by the early Middle Pleistocene West Runton Mammoth specimen from the West Runton Freshwater Bed of Norfolk, England, which was associated with a temperate forested environment during an interglacial period. In Central Europe, the steppe mammoth was common during glacial periods where it inhabited open landscapes, while remains of steppe mammoths are rare in the more temperate landscapes of Southern Europe. At times during glacial periods the species expanded as far south in Europe as the Peloponnese in Greece and Andalusia in the Iberian Peninsula, though no records are known any farther south than Rome in the Italian Peninsula. In Western Asia, remains are known from several sites across Anatolia in Turkey, as well in the Caucasus in Armenia, Georgia, and Azerbaijan. Some remains of the species have been reported from the Levant in Syria and Israel, but their attribution to the species has been questioned.

== Ecology ==
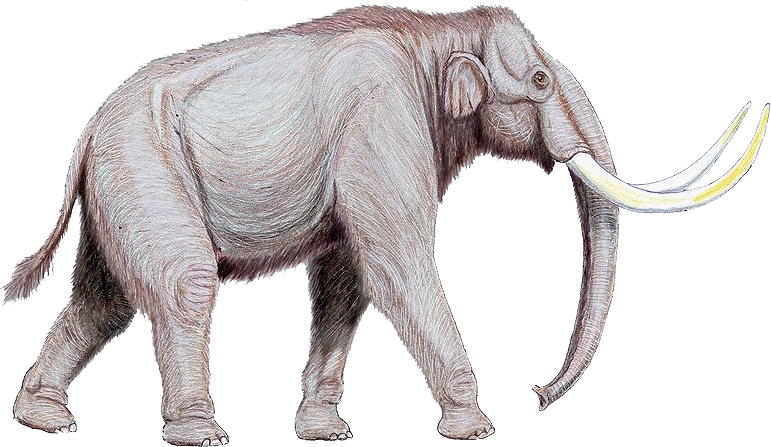
Life restoration with a coat of fur

Based on dental microwear analysis, steppe mammoths are thought to have ranged from grazers to mixed feeders, having a similar dietary breadth to Mammuthus meridionalis though considerably more shifted toward grazing on average, and distinct from the predominantly grazing diet inferred for woolly mammoths. The presence of wide scratches on the teeth suggests that steppe mammoths consumed bark and twigs of woody plants (browse), though the proportion of this consumed seems to have varied widely between steppe mammoth populations, with some populations exhibiting browse-dominated mixed feeding, while others consumed little to no browse. The lack of pits on analysed teeth suggests that steppe mammoths did not consume fruit, unlike earlier mammoth species. In Europe, steppe mammoths rarely co-occurred alongside the large, temperate adapted straight tusked-elephant (Palaeoloxodon antiquus) due to different habitat preferences, though they occasionally did so, like at the Ilford locality in Britain that dates to the Marine Isotope Stage (MIS) 7 interglacial (~200,000 years ago). At this locality, the two species appear to have engaged in dietary niche partitioning, with a heavily browsing based diet for this straight-tusked elephant population, and a heavily grazing based diet for the steppe mammoth population. Additional potential evidence of the two species’ coexistence and niche partitioning comes from the site of Philippi in northern Greece, where straight-tusked elephant molar mesowear reflects a mixed-feeding diet, while that of steppe mammoths indicates a strictly grazing diet. However, the uncertain stratigraphic provenance of the molars from this site makes these findings tentative.

== Evolution ==
M. trogontherii is suggested to have derived from an early population of Mammuthus meridionalis in East Asia. The oldest records of M. trogontherii are known from China, around 1.7 million years old, from the Nihewan Formation near Majuangou, Hebei. Steppe mammoths arrived in North America across Beringia around 1.5-1.3 million years ago, giving rise to the Columbian mammoth (the ancestor was previously thought to be M. meridionalis but this was due to misinterpretation of tooth wear patterns). Steppe mammoths replaced European Mammuthus meridionalis between 1–0.7 million years ago, in a complex diachronous mosaic pattern, coincident with the arrival of the temperate-adapted straight-tusked elephant (Palaeoloxodon antiquus) to Europe. European populations of M. trogontherii experienced progressive size reduction towards the end of the Middle Pleistocene, from around 400,000-300,000 years ago onwards.

The woolly mammoth (Mammuthus primigenius) had emerged in Northeast Siberia from M. trogontherii by around 600-500,000 years ago, reaching the typical molar morphology of M. primigenius around 400,000 years ago. Mammoths with M. primigenius type molar morphology displaced those of M. trogontherii type in Europe over the course of the late Middle Pleistocene, which was largely complete by 200,000 years ago (~MIS 7/6 boundary) in a protracted highly complex pattern including some molars with intermediate morphology between the two species that likely reflects gene flow from Siberian woolly mammoths into European M. trogontherii. Some authors have given remains intermediate between M. trogontherii and M. primigenius the species names Mammuthus intermedius and Mammuthus chosaricus (sometimes Mammuthus trogontherii chosaricus), though the definitions of these supposed species are poorly defined, and some remains attributed to these forms are similar in enamel thickness and lamellar length to "classic" early Middle Pleistocene M. trogontherii. The youngest remains attributed to M. trogontherii in Europe are known from early MIS 6 and hail from Nosak in the Kostolac Basin of northeastern Serbia, around 192,000 years old. The replacement of European M. trogontherii by woolly mammoths is widely considered to mark the extinction of the species, though some authors have suggested that M. trogontherii survived in northern China and southern Siberia into the Last Glacial Period, and at least one specimen from China has been dated to between 40,000-30,000 years ago.

M. trogontherii is suggested to be the ancestor of the dwarf mammoth species Mammuthus lamarmorai which inhabited the island of Sardinia in the Mediterranean during the late Middle Pleistocene and Late Pleistocene.

== Relationship with humans ==
At the Majuangou site in northern China, a M. trogontherii rib is suggested to display cutting marks. At the Bełchatów coal mine in Poland, dating to the late Middle Pleistocene (in the interglacial period of either MIS 11 or MIS 9, around 425-300,000 years ago), remains of M. trogontherii have been found with cut marks, suggested to represent evidence of butchery by archaic humans, possibly Homo heidelbergensis, though no stone tools were found at the site. At the Medzhibozh A site in western Ukraine, dating to MIS 11 around 400,000 years ago, M. trogontherii ivory fragments were found to have been deliberately knapped and split, representing some of the oldest evidence of ivory working in the archaeological record, though the ivory used was too soft to have effectively served as tools and was likely either an abortive attempt or was used as training material.

Sites with evidence of both humans and M. trogontherii in Europe are rare, especially compared to the contemporaneous straight-tusked elephant, which is suggested to be the result of humans and steppe mammoths primarily occupying different habitats in Europe during the Middle Pleistocene.

== See also ==
- Elephas recki
- Mammuthus columbi
- Palaeoloxodon
