= West Runton Cliffs =

Site of Special Scientific Interest in Norfolk, England

Coordinates: 52.941°N 1.253°E

- Site of Special Scientific Interest
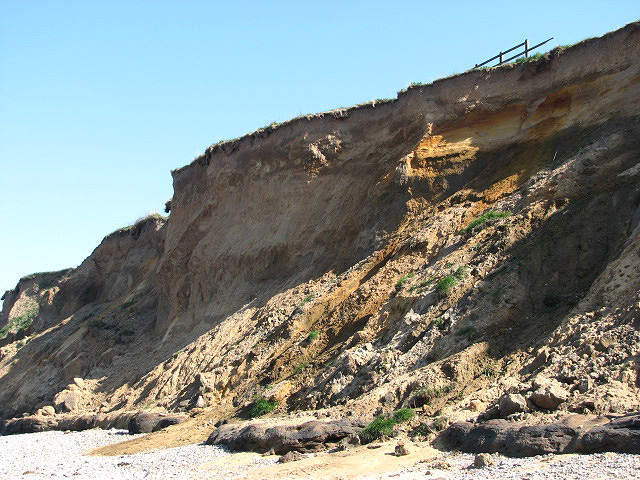
- Location of West Runton Cliffs.
- Area of search: Norfolk, England
- Grid reference: TG 187 431
- Interest: Geological
- Area: 17.8 hectares (44 acres)
- Notification date: 1984
- Location map: Magic Map

West Runton Cliffs is a 17.8-hectare (44-acre) geological Site of Special Scientific Interest east of Sheringham in Norfolk, England. It is a Geological Conservation Review site.

This site is important because it exposes a succession of warm and cold stages in the middle Pleistocene between about 2 million and 400,000 years ago, including the notably fossiliferous Cromer Forest Bed. It shows a succession of advances and retreats of the sea, and it is the stratotype for the Cromerian Stage.

The beach is open to the public.
