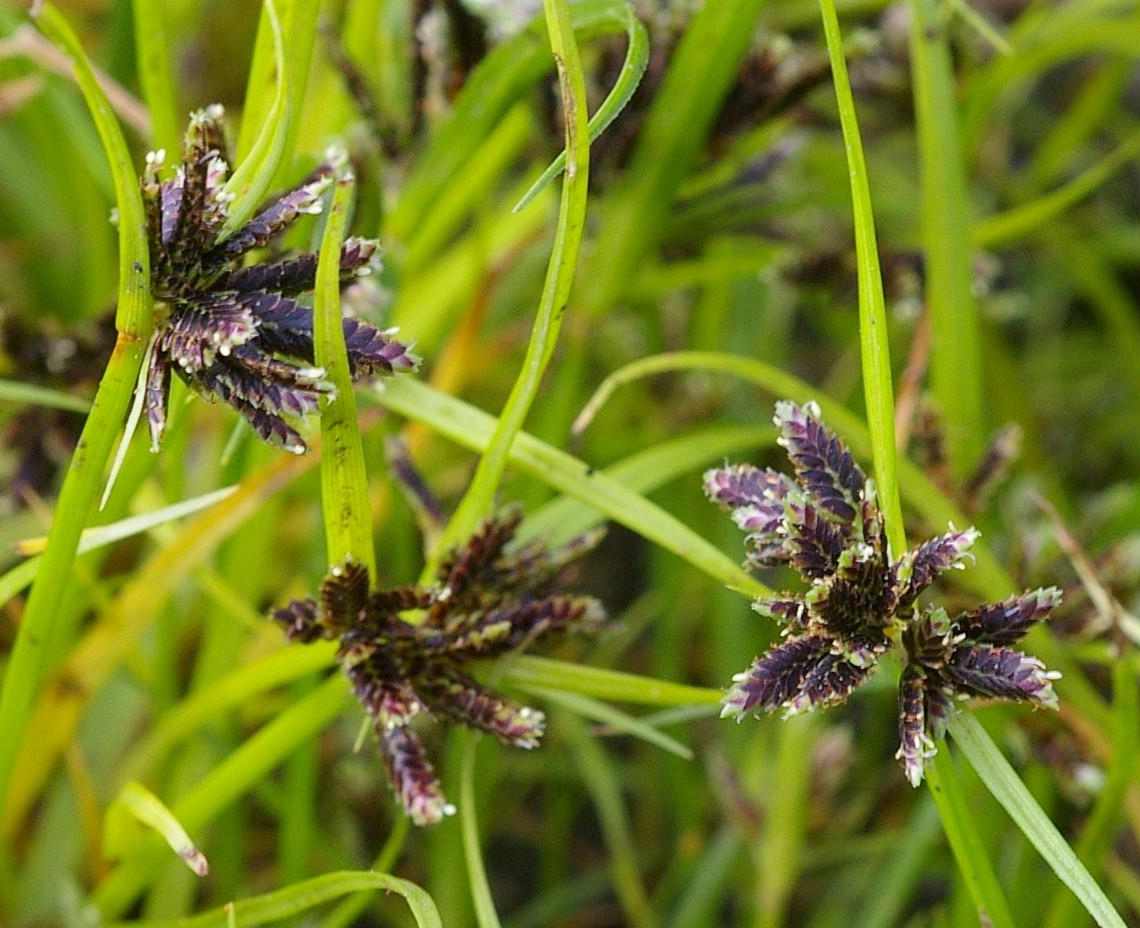

Conservation status
- Least Concern (IUCN 3.1)

Scientific classification
- Kingdom: Plantae
- Clade: Tracheophytes
- Clade: Angiosperms
- Clade: Monocots
- Clade: Commelinids
- Order: Poales
- Family: Cyperaceae
- Genus: Cyperus
- Species: C. fuscus

Binomial name
- Cyperus fuscus L.

Synonyms
- Homotypic synonyms: Cyperus fuscus var. vulgaris Schrad.; Eucyperus fuscus (L.) Rikli; Heterotypic synonyms: Cyperus calidus A.Kern.; Cyperus compressus Krock.; Cyperus forskaolii A.Dietr.; Cyperus fuscus f. calidus (A.Kern.) Asch. & Graebn.; Cyperus fuscus var. condensatus Kük.; Cyperus fuscus var. nigricans Neilr.; Cyperus fuscus var. pallescens Husn.; Cyperus fuscus f. serotinus Bolzon; Cyperus fuscus var. subjuncellus Kük.; Cyperus fuscus var. virescens (Hoffm.) Vahl; Cyperus fuscus var. virescens (Hoffm.) Schrad.; Cyperus fuscus subsp. virescens (Hoffm.) Arcang.; Cyperus fuscus f. virescens (Hoffm.) Vahl; Cyperus fuscus subsp. virescens (Hoffm.) K.Richt.; Cyperus haworthii Gray; Cyperus protractus Delile; Cyperus sabaudus Billet ex Gave; Cyperus virescens Hoffm.; Cyperus viridis Krock.

= Cyperus fuscus =

Brown flatsedge

Species of plant

Cyperus fuscus, also known as brown galingale or brown flatsedge, is a species of flowering plant in the sedge family Cyperaceae. It is native to Europe, Asia, and North Africa. It was introduced into North America.

== Description ==
Cyperus fuscus is an annual herb with paper-thin stems reaching 30 centimeters in maximum height. There may be short, flat leaves about the base of the plant. The inflorescence contains three to 15 spikelets, which are flat, oval or rectangular, and dark brown to deep purple. Each spikelet has around ten flowers enclosed in dark bracts. The fruit is a light brown achene about a millimeter long.

== Taxonomy ==
Cyperus fuscus was named and described by the Swedish botanist Carl Linnaeus in 1753. As of February 2026, the botanical name Cyperus fuscus L. is widely accepted.

== Distribution and habitat ==
Cyperus fuscus is native to Europe, Asia, and North Africa from England, Portugal and Morocco eastward to China and Thailand. In China, it is found in swamps, river margins, and other wet places including paddy fields.

Cyperus fuscus was introduced into North America where it is naturalized in widely scattered locations in the United States and Canada. European botanists were aware of its presence in North America as early as 1825. It was first collected in Essex County, Massachusetts in 1877. By 1998, it had spread to the following states and provinces: California, Connecticut, Maryland, Missouri, Nebraska, Nevada, New Jersey, Ontario, Pennsylvania, South Dakota, and Virginia. Subsequently it was discovered in Arkansas, Mississippi, Michigan, Minnesota, and Quebec. It grows in damp, disturbed soils along emergent shorelines.

== Conservation ==
In the UK, Cyperus fuscus is one of 100 species named as a priority for conservation by the conservation charity Plantlife.

== See also ==
- List of Cyperus species
- Glossary of botanical terms

== Bibliography ==
- Knowlton, C. H.; Cushman, J. A.; Deane, Walter; Harrison, A. K. (1911). "Reports on the flora of Boston District-VIII". Rhodora. 13: 27–29.
- McKenzie, Paul M.; Jacobs, Brad; Bryson, Charles T.; Tucker, Gordon C.; Carter, Richard (1998). "Cyperus fuscus (Cyperaceae), new to Missouri and Nevada, with comments on its occurrence in North America". Sida. 18 (1): 325–333.
- Oldham, Michael J.; Bickel, Grant (2019). "Cyperus fuscus, new to Renfrew County and the City of Ottawa". Trail & Landscape. 53 (1): 24–28.
- Sprengel, Curt Polycarp Joachim (1825). Systema vegetabilium. Vol. 1 (16th ed.). Gottingae, sumtibus Librariae Dieterichianae.
