= Common polypody =

Common polypody is a common name for several ferns in the genus Polypodium and may refer to:

- Polypodium virginianum, native to North America
- Polypodium vulgare, native to Europe
