= Oltmanns =

Oltmanns may refer to:

- Caroline Oltmanns (born 1962), German pianist
- Friedrich Oltmanns (1860–1945), German psychologist
- Larry Oltmanns (born 1951), American architect
- Reimar Oltmanns (born 1949), German journalist
- Torsten Oltmanns (born 1964), German author and economist
