= Hartmut Thieme =

German archaeologist

Hartmut Thieme (born 20 November 1947 in Oberhausen) is a German prehistoric archaeologist at the Institut für Denkmalpflege in Hannover. He is known for leading the team that discovered Europe's oldest known spears in a coal mine in Schöningen, Germany.
