= Schöningen spears =

Set of ten wooden weapons from the Palaeolithic Age

Coordinates: 52°08′14″N 10°59′18″E

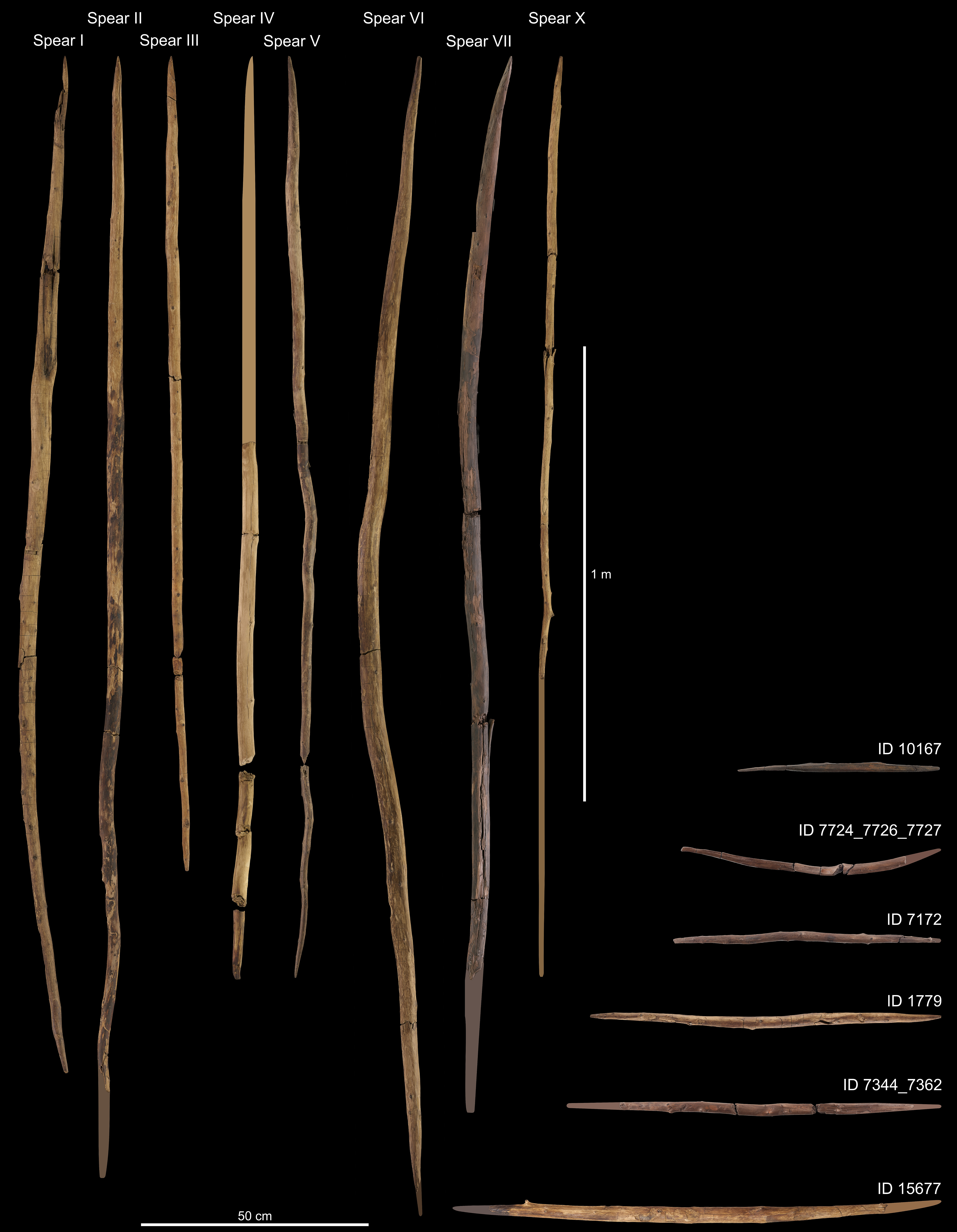
The Schöningen spears (left), along with several double-pointed sticks (bottom right)

The Schöningen spears are a set of ten Palaeolithic wooden weapons that were excavated between 1994 and 1999 from the 'Spear Horizon' in the open-cast lignite mine in Schöningen, Helmstedt district, Germany. The spears are among the oldest hunting weapons yet discovered and were found together with animal bones and stone and bone tools. Being used by the oldest known group of human hunters, they provided unique proof that early human ancestors were much closer to modern humans in both complex social structure and technical ability than thought previously. The excavations at the Schöningen site took place under the management of Hartmut Thieme of the Lower Saxony State Service for Cultural Heritage (NLD).

The age of the spears, originally assessed as being between 380,000 and 400,000 years old during Marine Isotope Stage 11, was estimated from their stratigraphic position in the site, 'sandwiched between deposits of the Elsterian and Saalian glaciations, and situated within a well-studied sedimentary sequence'. However, more recently, thermoluminescence dating of heated flints in a deposit beneath that which contained the spears, dates the spears to between 337,000 and 300,000 years old, placing them at the end of the interglacial Marine Isotope Stage (MIS) 9, and recent scholarship has tended to support an MIS 9 date for the spears. However, a 2025 study suggested an even younger age of approximately 200,000 years ago, and manufacture by Neanderthals. The Schöningen spears are the oldest complete wooden weapons and, along with the incomplete British Clacton spear point, among the oldest known worked wooden implements.

The spears were constructed from Norway spruce as well as pine. They are suggested to have been used both as throwing weapons, as well as thrusting spears for personal defense.

To date, hominin remains have not been discovered from the Schöningen Pleistocene deposits and, therefore, the species that crafted and used the wooden weapons and other tools at Schöningen remains uncertain. The most likely candidates are Homo heidelbergensis or early Neanderthals. The spears provide evidence of the importance of wood as a material for Palaeolithic tools. Unlike stone and metal artifacts, those made of wood almost always decompose thoroughly, and this enhances the importance of the discovery.

The spears were found associated with numerous bones of the extinct horse species Equus mosbachensis that display cut marks indicative of butchery.

== Discovery and location ==
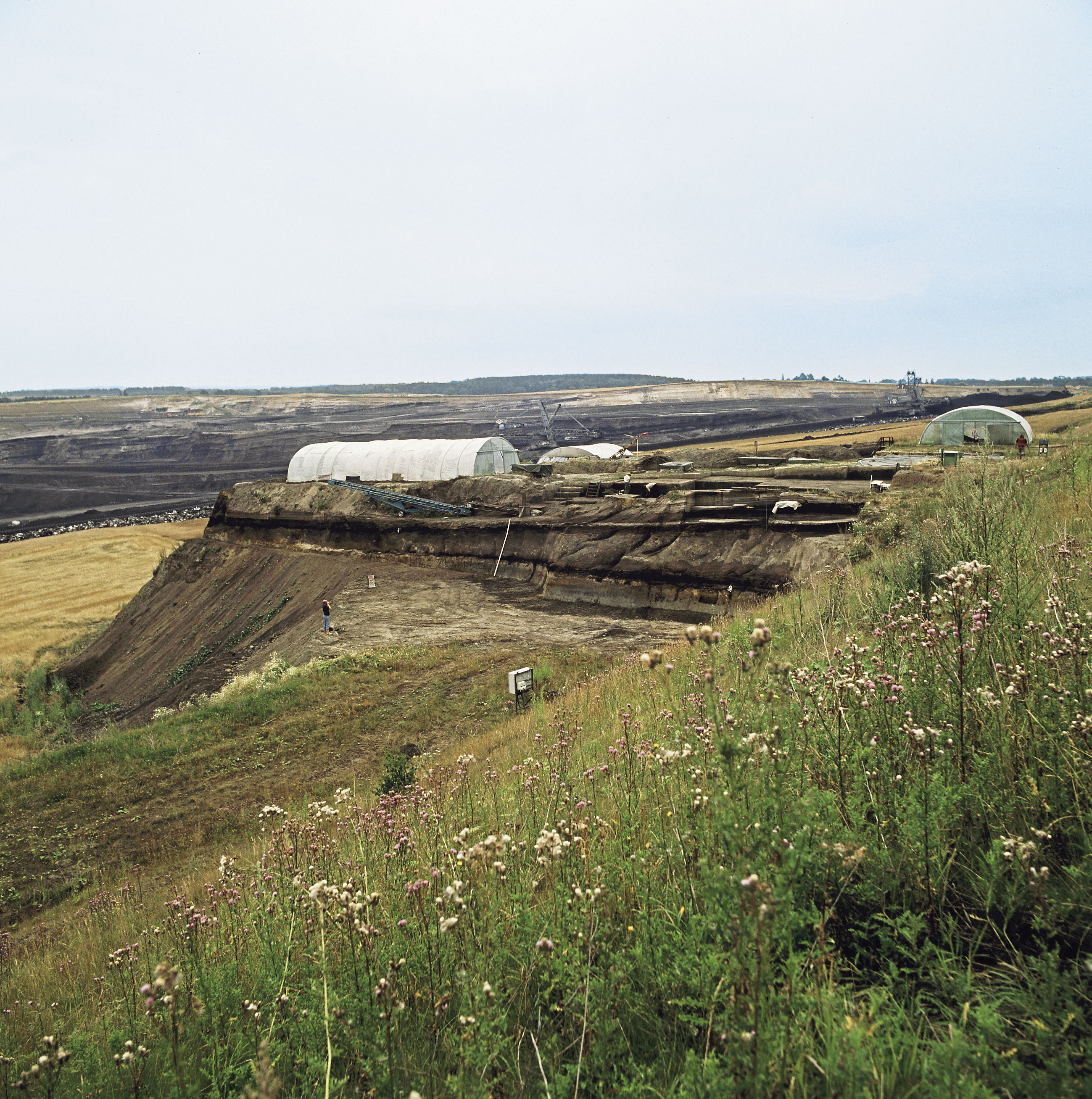
Excavation site

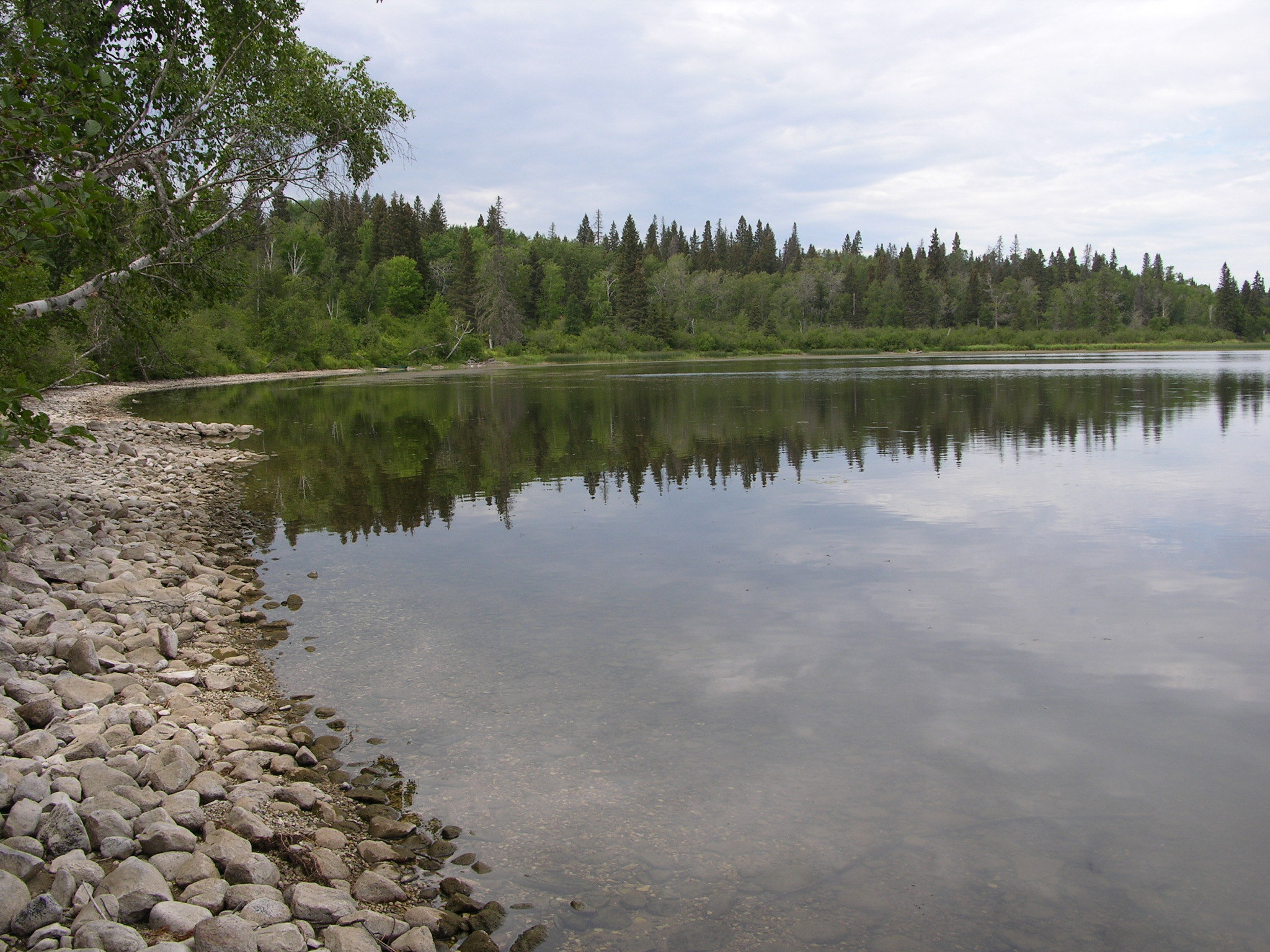
The littoral zone of a lake

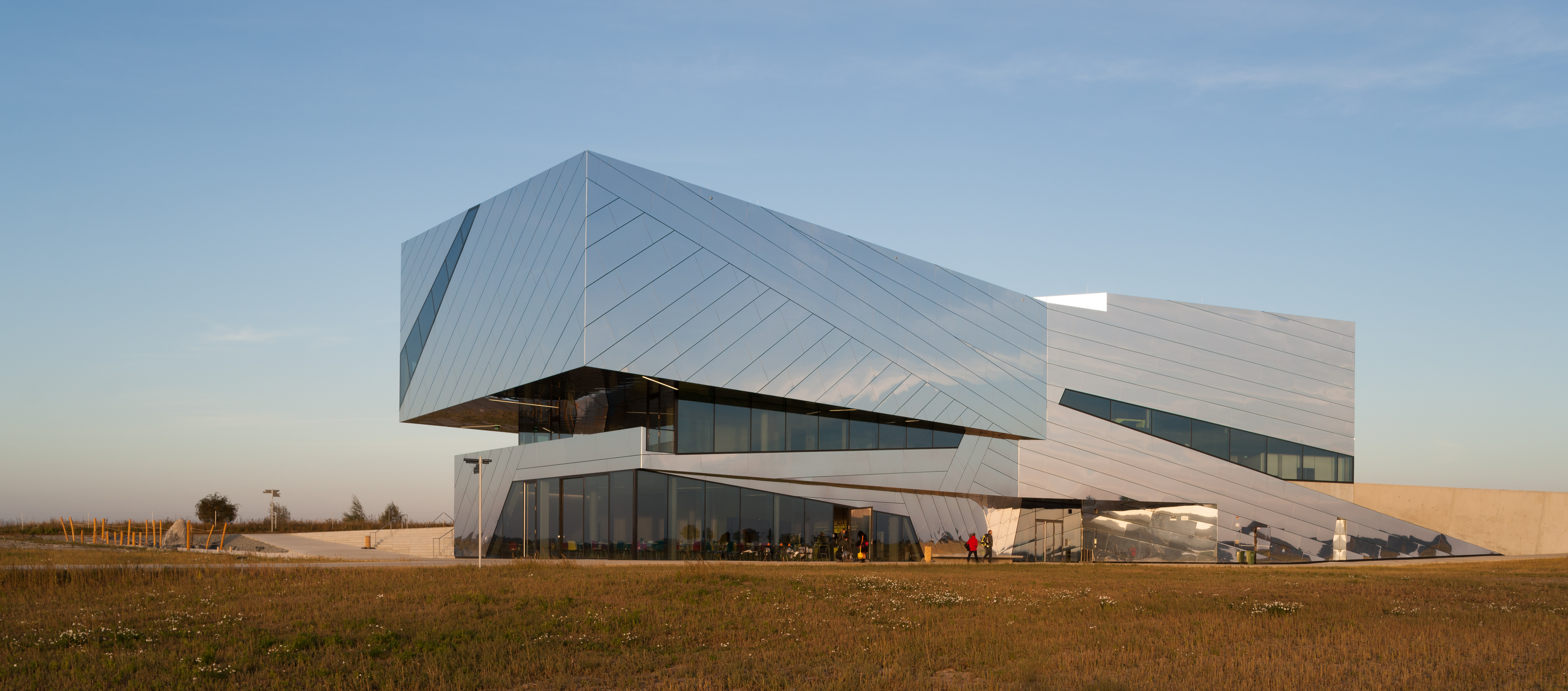
Museum for the spears at the finding site

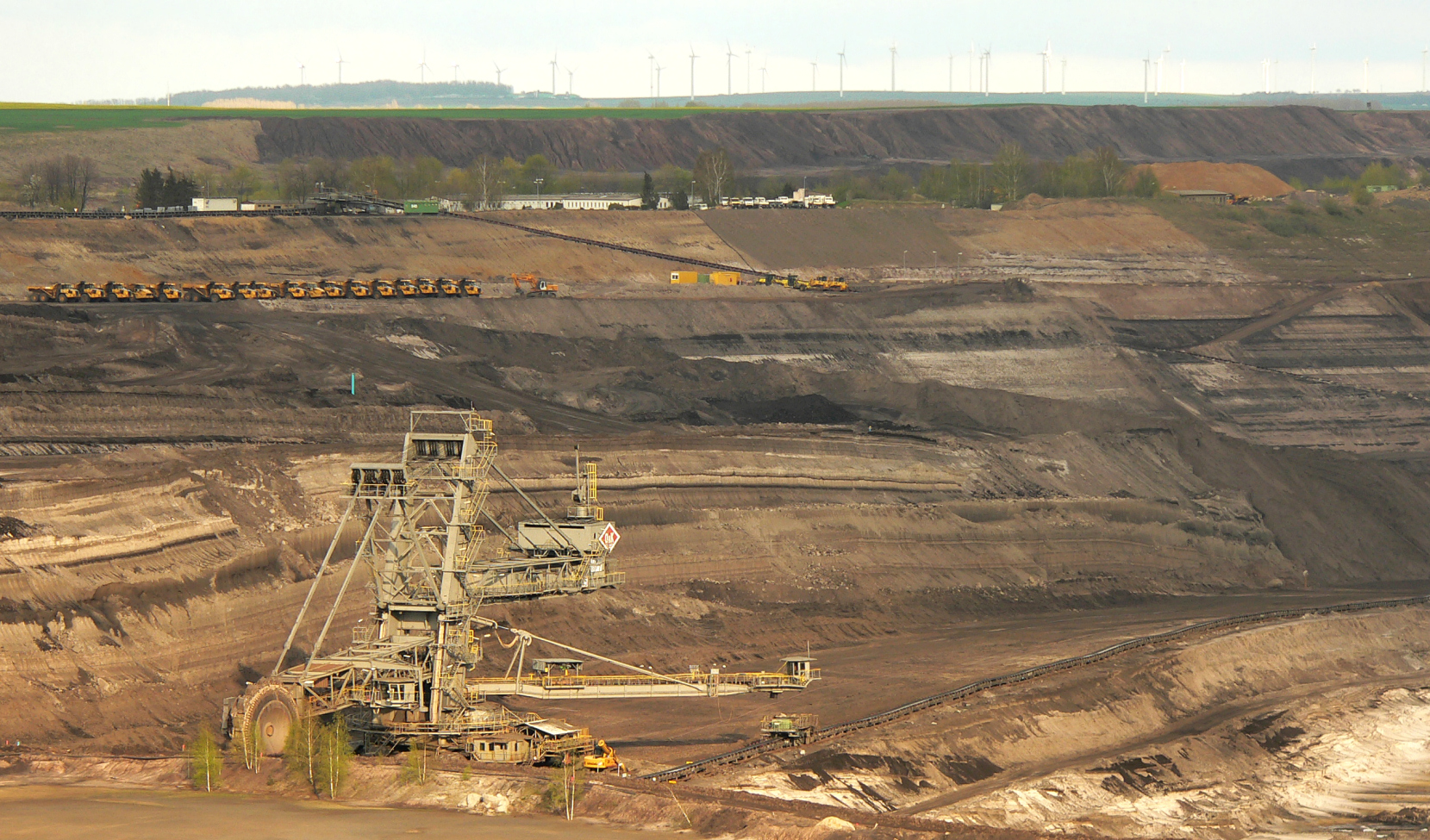
Schöningen mine

The site of the 'Spear Horizon' (Schöningen 13 II, sedimentary sequence 4) is one of 20 Palaeolithic archaeological sites discovered during excavations from 1994 through to the present day.

The 60 by 50 m (200 by 160 ft) excavation base that was excluded from coal mining represents a small segment of a former littoral zone. This zone was visited over millennia, between the Elster- and Saale ice ages, by humans and animals alike. The pedestal displays five massive layered sediment packages that were created by varying levels of the lake and silting-up processes.

The find horizon was preserved through rapid sedimentation of a lakeshore that resulted from the retreat of the Elsterian ice sheet. Due to water-logged conditions, the organic materials are exceptionally well preserved and include not only the well-known wooden spears but also other botanical remains including two double-pointed sticks interpreted as possible 'throwing sticks', alongside fragments of wood, fruits, seeds, and pollen. The tools and animal remains are primarily confined to a 10 m (33 ft) wide belt, consisting of the former lakeshore. The archaeological layers beneath 13 II-4 have been the objective of ongoing research excavation by the DFG (German Research Association) since 2010. A southern extension of Schöningen 13 II-4 has been excavated since 2011.

The site was originally interpreted by the initial excavator, Hartmut Thieme, as a single mass hunting event. According to his scenario, the thick reeds at the lake shore gave the hunters cover, from where the horses, trapped between the hunters and the lake, were culled with accurate spear throws. Because there are bones of young animals among the horse bones, he concluded that the hunt took place in autumn. Furthermore, he saw evidence of ritualistic activity, because the spears were left behind. Subsequent research on the horse remains have demonstrated that in fact the prey died in different seasons, showing the site was revisited repeatedly by humans.

Many of the archaeological remains, including most of the spears, are on display at the Forschungsmuseum Schöningen in Schöningen.

== Description and function ==
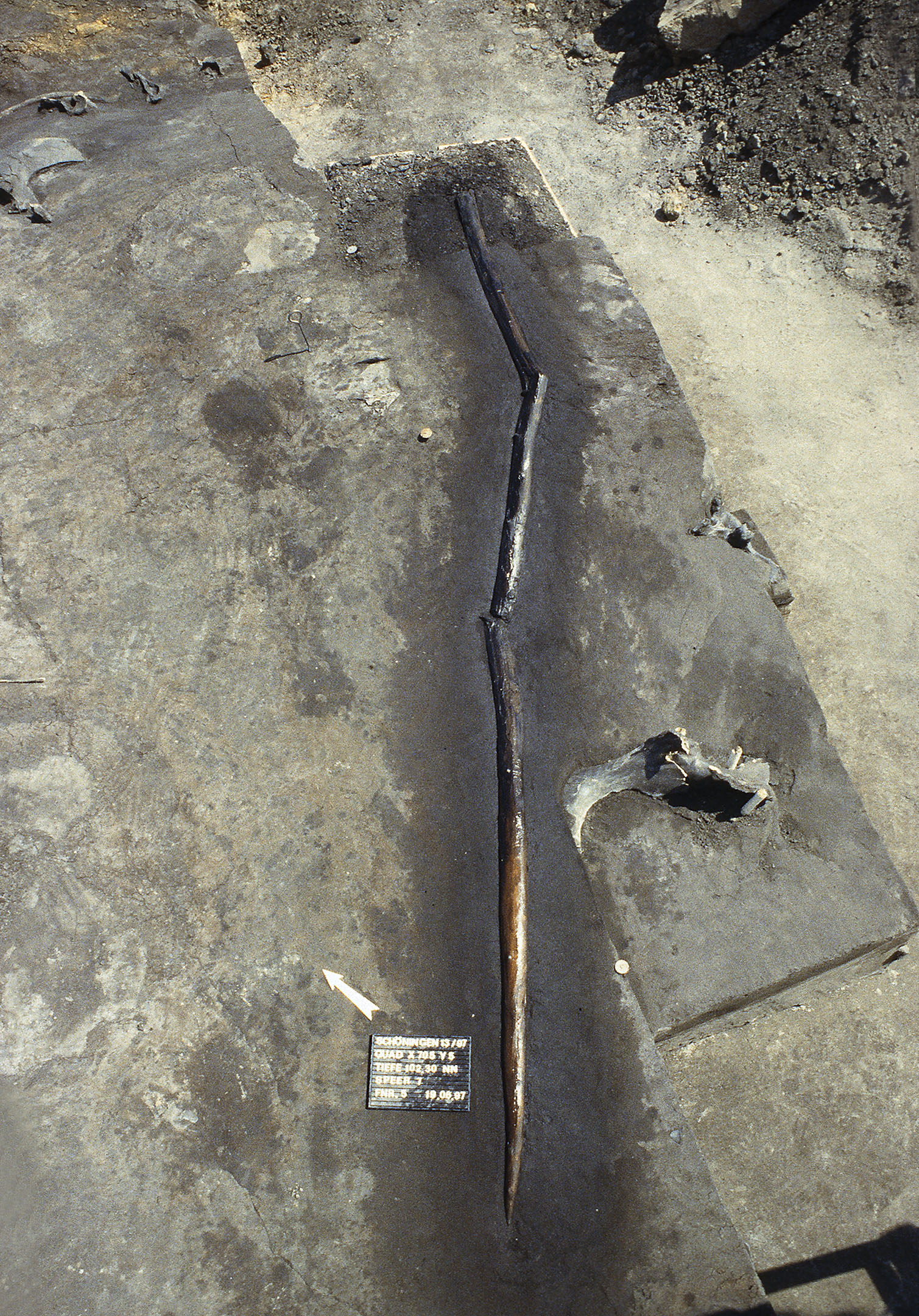
A spear in situ

Most of the spears were made using trunks of slow-growing spruce trees, except for spear IV, which is made from pine. The complete spears vary in length from 1.84 to 2.53 m (6.04 to 8.30 ft), with diameters ranging from 29 to 47 mm (1.14 to 1.85 in). The wooden finds were exposed to sedimentary pressure, and there are varying degrees of deformation.

The spears were debarked and have evidence of working traces at both ends, demonstrating that they were shaped to be double pointed. One exception is Spear VI, which does not appear to taper at the back. The points of the spears made use of the bases of trees, which is harder wood, while the soft inner pith is offset from the tip. These features suggest an awareness of the properties of wood, being designed in such a way as to maximise the hardness of wood.

Like today's tournament javelins, the greatest diameter and therefore likely the centre of gravity is located in the front third of the shaft of at least some of the spears. In addition, most of the spears, with the exception of Spear VI, taper at both the front and the back, which may assist flight aerodynamics. This led many to suggest that they may have been designed as thrown spears, similar to a modern javelin.

Experimental research using experienced athletes to throw replicas of Spear II show that the spears are capable of being thrown at distances of at least 15 to 20 m (49 to 66 ft), and are similar in weight and balance to javelins. However, Spear VI, which does not taper at the back and also has a natural kink, is interpreted as a thrusting spear, and replicas of Spear II have also been experimentally tested as thrusting spears. Ethnographically, wooden spears were used as both thrusting and throwing spears. Together the evidence suggests that the Schöningen spears most likely had multiple uses including for self-defence against dangerous predators like the large lion-sized scimitar-toothed cat Homotherium, with whom the humans shared the landscape.

== Other discoveries ==
In addition to the spears and double-pointed sticks, a charred wooden stick made of spruce and measuring 87.7 by 3.6 cm (34.5 by 1.4 in) was also found at Schöningen 13 II-4, and is interpreted as a possible skewer. As of 2020, the University of Göttingen and the Lower Saxony State Service for Cultural Heritage are carrying out further research on the wood.

Also among the finds are the so-called 'clamp shafts', excavated from locality Schöningen 12b, a site that formed earlier than Schöningen 13 II-4. These tools were made from the extremely hard wooden branch-bases of the European silver fir. They are noticeably worked and may have been used as handles for stone tools.

As of 2015, around 1500 stone tools and over 12,000 animal bones were found. The stone tools comprise denticulates, some bifacially worked tools, retouched flakes and scrapers, but there are no handaxes or handaxe thinning flakes. As such the stone tools are interpreted as late Lower Palaeolithic in nature. The majority of animal bones with signs of butchery belong to an extinct species of horse (Equus mosbachensis). Also present are red deer and large bovids. Marks on the bones suggest that the humans had first access to the carcasses, and that carnivores such as wolves and sabre-tooth cats accessed the bones later. Marks from stone tools suggest that humans worked together to butcher their prey. Bone tools have also been discovered in the 'Spear Horizon', and are suggested to have been used for knapping flint and for breaking open other bones for marrow.

Other animals found in the "spear horizon" do not display evidence of butchery, and likely accumulated naturally, these include: red deer, roe deer, European wild ass, aurochs, steppe bison, wild boar, Irish elk, Merck's rhinoceros and the narrow-nosed rhinoceros, straight-tusked elephant grey wolves, red foxes, stoats, least weasels, and the sabretooth cat Homotherium (among the youngest records of the genus in Eurasia), along with the European beaver and the extinct giant beaver Trogontherium, with small mammals including water voles, pygmy shrews, desmans, the European mole, the Narrow-headed, tundra, short-tailed field, common, European pine, European water and bank voles, along with the Norway lemming.

This layer is suggested to have been deposited in a steppe environment with mild summers and cold winters, colder than those in the contemporary environment at the site today, with the lakeshore being covered by sedges and surrounded by willow and birch swamp forest, while the surrounding steppe environment had scattered pine and larch trees, and juniper shrubs.

== Significance ==
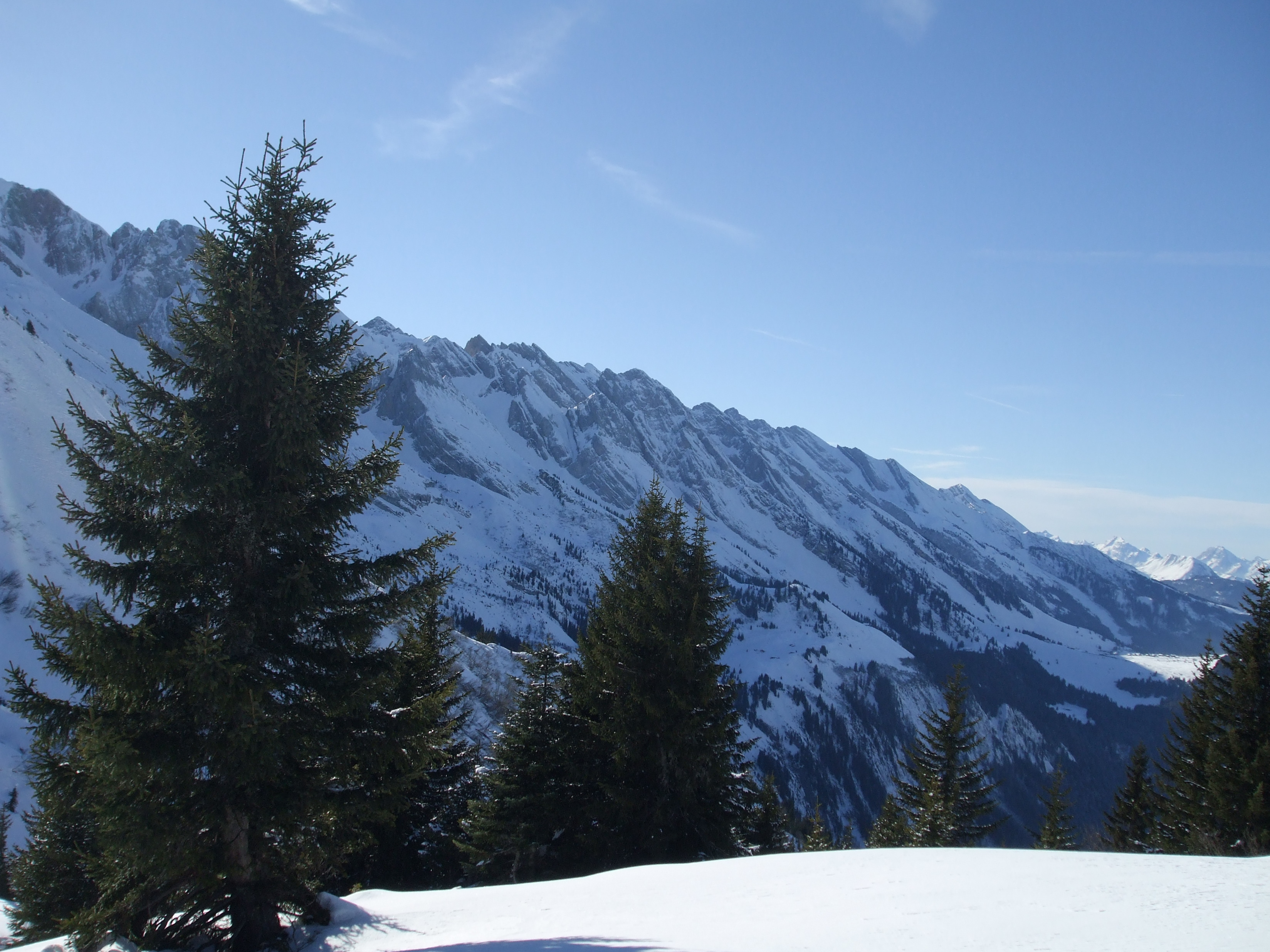
Nine of the spears are made of spruce (Picea abies) wood

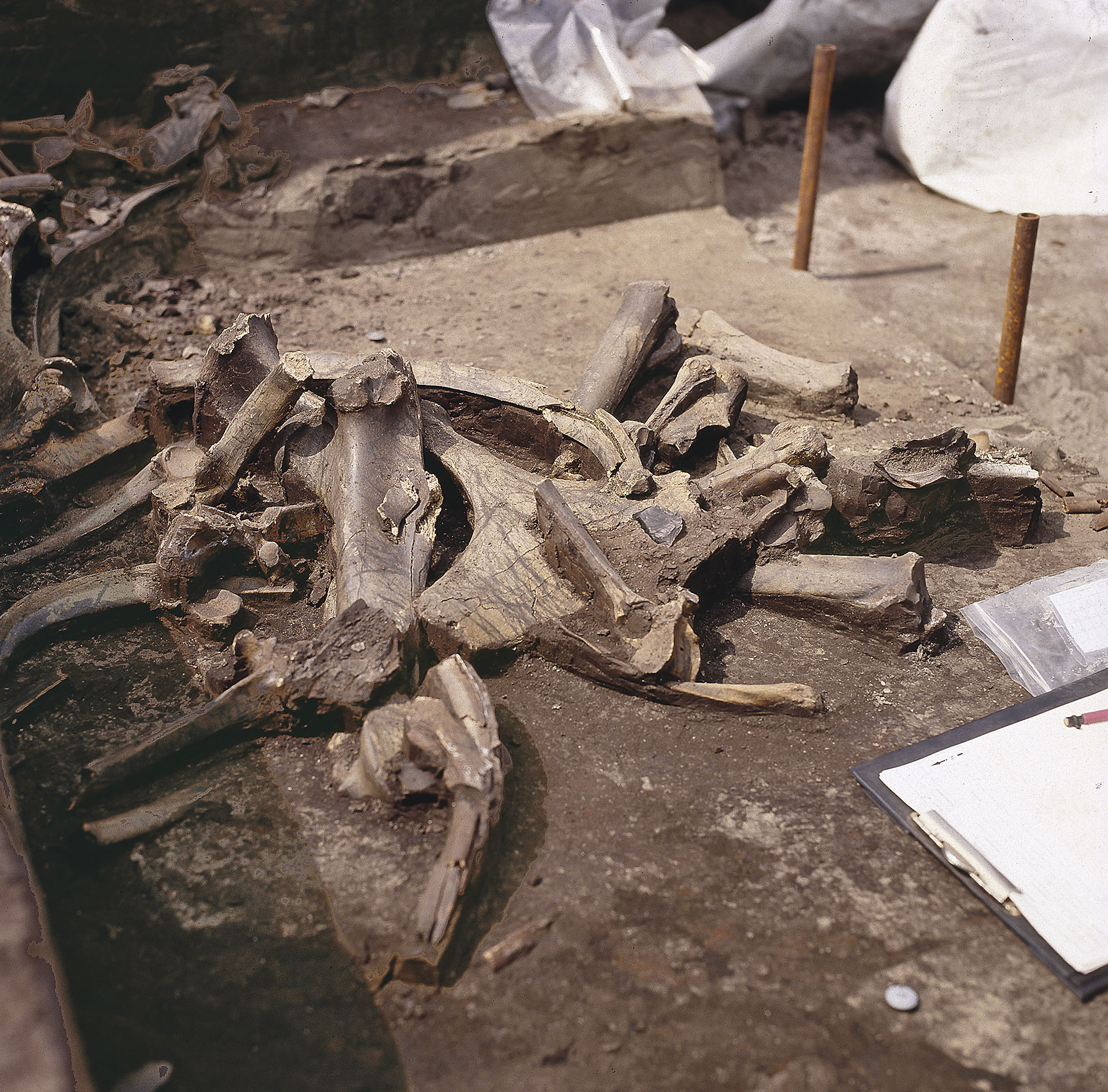
Associated bone fossils

The spears and the place of discovery revolutionized the picture of the cultural and social development of early humans. Previously, Middle Pleistocene hominins, whether Homo heidelbergensis or early Neanderthals, were regarded as simple beings without language who acquired meat by scavenging other carnivore kills or natural deaths. The spears and their correlated finds are evidence of complex technological skills and are the first direct evidence that these humans hunted their prey. The large and swift prey that the Schöningen humans butchered suggests that their technologies and hunting strategies were sophisticated, that they had complex social structures, and had developed some form of communication (language ability). The Schöningen humans therefore likely had cognitive skills such as anticipatory planning, thinking, and acting, some of which had only previously been attributed to modern humans. In addition, the spears have played a major role in debates about the origins of throwing.

Since 2010, the excavations on top of the excavation base continued in the framework of a project by the Lower Saxony State Service for Cultural Heritage in Hannover and the Eberhard Karls University Tübingen, Department of Early Prehistory and Quaternary Ecology of the Institute of Pre- and Protohistory and Mediaeval Archaeology, supported by the Deutsche Forschungsgemeinschaft (German Research Association). Numerous cooperation partners domestic and abroad have been involved in the analysis of the excavations and material culture: Lower Saxony State Office for Heritage, University of Tübingen, Rijksuniversiteit Leiden (paleontology), Leuphana University Lüneburg (palynologie), Senckenberg Research Institute and Nature Museum in Frankfurt am Main, Leibniz University Hannover (geology), Institute for Quaternary Lumbers Langnau (wood anatomy), Romano-Germanic Central Museum Mainz and others.

In 2009, Lower Saxony allocated public funds from the increased funds for the economy package II for the construction of a research and development centre. The Forschungsmuseum is close to the place of discovery and is devoted to the inter-disciplinary research of the Schöningen excavations and Pleistocene archaeology, and presents the original finds in an experience-orientated, modern exhibition. The transparent research and laboratory area as well as an interactive visitor's laboratory link the 'research' and 'museum' areas. A 24-hectare outdoor area presents typical plant communities of the interglacial. The space is also an educational venue. The building contractor was the town of Schöningen. Responsible for the conception and contextual planning was the Lower Saxony State Service of Cultural Heritage. The centre was opened at the beginning of 2013.

== Debates ==
Archaeologists at the University of Tübingen have questioned some of the initial interpretations of the site. Isotope analysis and wear patterns on the horse teeth show a wide variety of habitat and diet amongst the animals, indicating that the faunal assemblage accumulated in many small events, rather than one large slaughter.

Sediment analysis shows that the red colour previously thought to be a result of hearths and burning are actually iron compounds forming as the lake levels dropped in recent times. Lake algae, sponges, and small crustaceans found in the sediments led to a suggestion that the spears were never used on dry land and that the deposit had always been submerged. In that scenario, the horses may have been hunted in shallow water rather than at the lake edge. As yet the hunting strategies and depositional circumstances of the spears remain unresolved.

A further debate has centred around whether Schöningen humans were capable of powerful and accurate throws, and whether their wooden spears were effective as distance weapons.

== Similar finds ==
Wooden spears from the Palaeolithic are rare discoveries. Well-preserved finds include the ca. 400,000 year old broken Clacton Spear from Clacton-on-Sea (England), and the wooden Lehringen spear from Lehringen (Germany), which is around 120,000 years old. Other finds such as those from Bad Cannstatt (Germany/Baden-Wuerttemberg) and Bilzingsleben are debatable as their preservation was poor.
