= Schöningen =

- Town
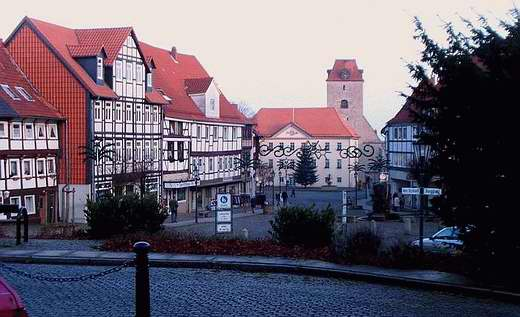
- Market place and St Vincent Church

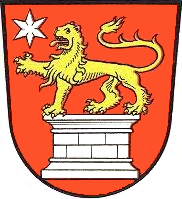
- Coat of arms

- Location of Schöningen within Helmstedt district
- Interactive map of Schöningen
- Location within Germany Location within Lower Saxony
- Coordinates: 52°08′N 10°57′E
- Country: Germany
- State: Lower Saxony
- District: Helmstedt
- First mentioned: 747

Government
  - Mayor (2019–24): Malte Schneider (SPD)

Area
  - Total: 35.47 km^{2} (13.70 sq mi)
- Elevation: 114 m (374 ft)

Population (2025-12-31)
  - Total: 10,937
  - Density: 308.3/km^{2} (798.6/sq mi)
- Time zone: UTC+01:00 (CET)
  - Summer (DST): UTC+02:00 (CEST)
- Postal codes: 38364
- Dialling codes: 05352
- Vehicle registration: HE
- Website: www.schoeningen.de

Schöningen (German pronunciation: [ˈʃøːnɪŋən]) is a town of about 11,000 inhabitants in the district of Helmstedt, in Lower Saxony, Germany.

== Geography ==
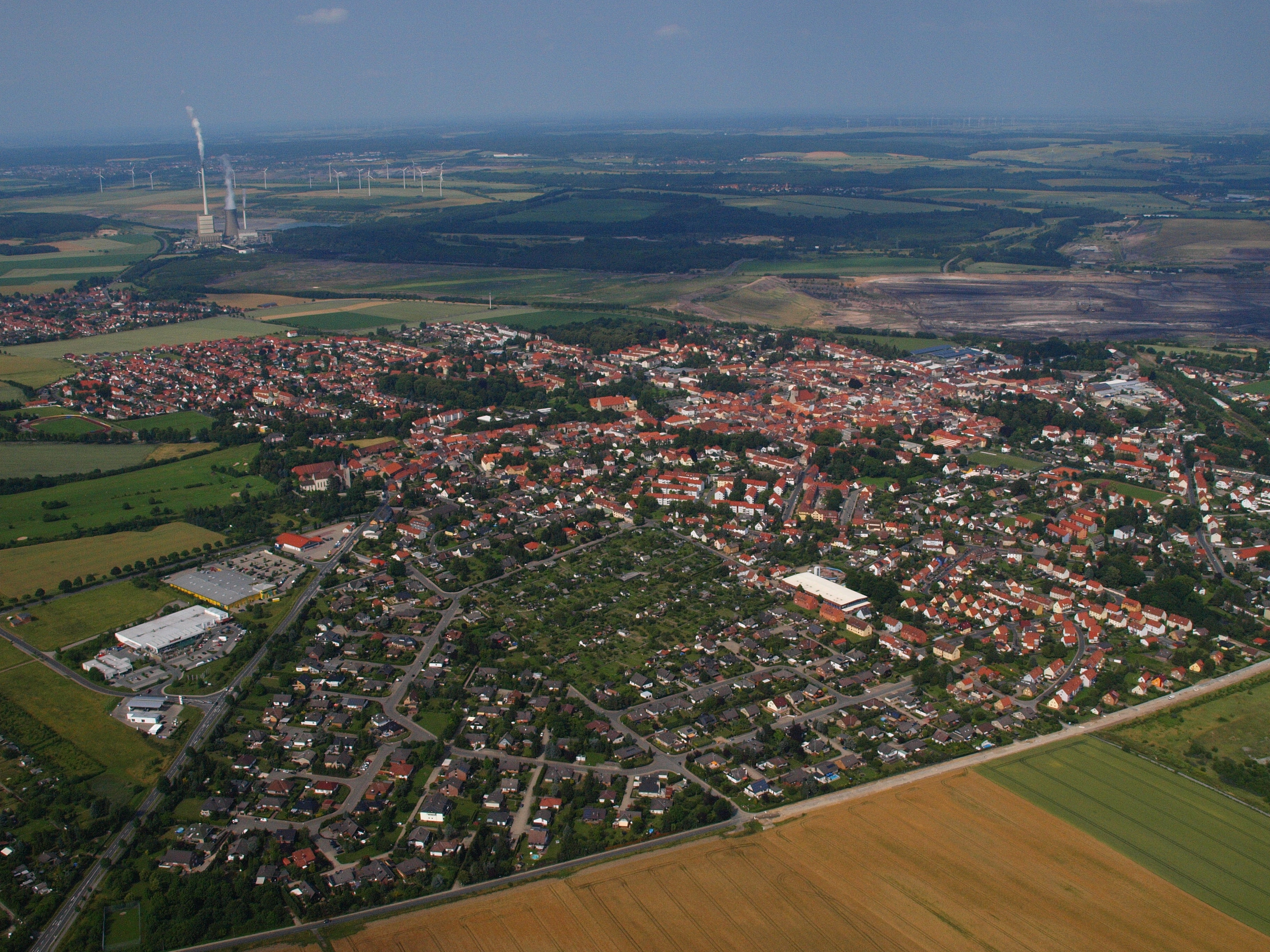
Aerial view with Buschhaus Power Plant

The town is located on the southeastern rim of the Elm hill range, near the border with the state of Saxony-Anhalt. In its current form, it was created in 1974 by joining the municipalities of Esbeck, Hoiersdorf, and Schöningen.

Schöningen station was served by regional trains on the Wolfenbüttel–Helmstedt railway line until it was closed in 2007. The town is a stop on the scenic German Timber-Frame Road.

== History ==
In archaeology, Schöningen is famous for the Schöningen Spears, four ancient wooden spears found in the "spear horizon" in an opencast mine near the town (Bamford & Henderson 2003). The spears are about 400,000 years old (Klein. 2005. p114), making them the world's oldest human-made wooden artifacts, as well as the oldest weapons, ever found. Three of them were probably manufactured as projectile weapons, because the weight and tapered point is at the front of the spear making it fly straight in flight, similar to the design of a modern javelin. The fourth spear is shorter with points at both ends and is thought to be a thrusting spear or a throwing stick (Bamford & Henderson 2003). They were found in combination with the remains of about 20 wild horses, whose bones contain numerous butchery marks, including one pelvis that still had a spear sticking out of it. This is considered proof that early humans were active hunters with specialized tool kits. The spears are currently on display at the paläon visitor centre, opened in 2013.

The 300,000-year-old, nearly entire remains of a female straight-tusked elephant were revealed by University of Tübingen researchers and the Senckenberg Centre for Human Evolution in May 2020. According to the archaeozoologist Ivo Verheijen, the 6.8-ton skeleton had battered teeth and a shoulder height of about 3.2 metres. Researchers also uncovered two long bones and thirty small flint flakes that were used as tools for knapping among the elephant bones.

The first historical mentioning of the Saxon settlement in the Royal Frankish Annals dates back to 747, when the Carolingian Mayor of the Palace Pepin the Short stayed at Scahaningi during the conflict with his half-brother Grifo. Schöningen was the site of a Königspfalz of Pepin's son Charlemagne and later of the Ottonian dynasty. Saint Willigis, Archbishop of Mainz from 975, was probably born at Schöningen about 940. He served as archchancellor of Emperor Otto III who stayed here several times. Schöningen was the site of a Benedictine abbey founded in 983. Nearby Elm Castle, erected in the 11th century, was the seat of a commandry of the Teutonic Knights from 1221 onwards.

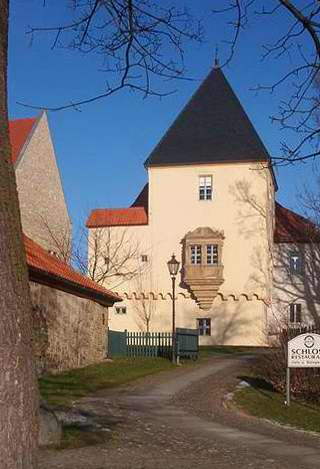
Schöningen Castle

From the 14th century, it was held by the Welf dukes of Brunswick-Lüneburg, who granted Schöningen town privileges in 1332. About 1350, Duke Magnus the Pious had Schöningen Castle built as a hunting lodge and also to secure the nearby border with the Bishopric of Halberstadt. It was damaged during the Schmalkaldic War in 1542, when Duke Henry V of Brunswick-Wolfenbüttel fought against the troops of the Protestant Schmalkaldic League. It later served as a widow's seat of his consort Sophia Jagiellon, sister of the Polish king Sigismund II Augustus, and of her successors Elizabeth of Denmark and Anna Sophia, daughter of Elector John Sigismund of Brandenburg. Duchess Elizabeth, sister of King Christian IV of Denmark had the palace rebuilt in a lavish Renaissance style from 1613 onwards. In 1640 Anna Sophia established a Latin school (Anna-Sophianeum) in Schöningen, which exists as a Gymnasium up to today.

Schöningen Castle was also the administrative seat of a Brunswick Amtmann. From 1679 it served as the residence of Anna Sophia, daughter of Duke Anthony Ulrich of Brunswick-Wolfenbüttel and spouse of Margrave Charles Gustav of Baden-Durlach. Her sister Elizabeth Eleonora married Duke Bernhard I of Saxe-Meiningen here. In 1733 Prince Frederick II of Prussia stayed here en route to his marriage with Elisabeth Christine of Brunswick-Wolfenbüttel-Bevern at Salzdahlum. After the seat of the local administration was moved to Helmstedt in 1815, the castle decayed.

== Economy ==
The main industry in Schöningen is open-cast mining of lignite, which is used for electricity generation in the Buschhaus Power Station. Both mining and generation are operated by E.ON subdivisions. Buschhaus Power Station and open-cast mining would be closed down in 2017. The Buschhaus plant now inhibits three lines of thermal waste treatment.

The Sachtleben Chemie company was founded as Lithopone- und Permanentweißfabrik at Schöningen in 1878; the production facilities were relocated to Duisburg in 1892.

Schöningen is the site of a ground station operated by the German Federal Intelligence Service (Bundesnachrichtendienst) intelligence agency.

== Politics ==
Seats in the municipal assembly (Stadtrat) as of 2011 elections:

- Social Democratic Party of Germany (SPD): 17
- Christian Democratic Union (CDU): 9
- Free Voters: 2
- Alliance 90/The Greens: 2

Elections in 2016:

- SPD: 11
- CDU: 10
- Alliance 90/the Greens: 2
- UWG: 3
- ZIEL: 1
- Single candidate Schliphake: 1
- Total: 28

In November 2019 Malte Schneider was elected the new mayor.

== International relations ==
Schöningen is twinned with:

- Beni Hassen, Monastir Governorate, Tunisia
- Oschersleben, Germany
- Outokumpu, Finland
- Zolochiv, Ukraine

== Notable people ==
- Willigis (ca. 940-1011), Archbishop of Mainz
- Reimar Oltmanns (born 1949), journalist and author
