= Sachtleben Chemie =

Sachtleben Chemie GmbH
- Company type: GmbH
- Industry: Chemical industries
- Genre: Chemical industries
- Founded: Schöningen, Germany, (1878)
- Founder: Dr. Rudolf Sachtleben
- Successor: Metallgesellschaft
- Headquarters: Duisburg, NRW Germany
- Number of locations: Duisburg, Germany; Pori, Finland; Krefeld, Germany
- Area served: worldwide
- Key people: Vernon S. Sumner (Chief Executive Officer), Andreas Grünewald (Chief Financial Officer), Juha Mäkinen (Chief Commercial Officer)
- Products: specialty chemicals, white pigments, titanium dioxide, functional additives, barytes, zinc sulfate, sulfuric acid
- Revenue: approx. 820 million Euro (2012)
- Number of employees: approx. 2.200
- Website: sachtleben.de

Sachtleben Chemie is a chemicals producer, with its primary focus on the production of white pigments, fillers and extenders. The company employs some 2,200 persons and achieves annual sales of around 820 million euros (2012). Sachtleben has been a member of the multinational Venator group since 2017. The company's corporate history reaches back over 130 years. Sachtleben produces particles using titanium dioxide, zinc sulfide and barium sulfate as the chemical basis, and markets these products worldwide. The principal applications for Sachtleben products include man-made fibers, paints and other coatings, plastics, and paper. Sachtleben also supplies special particles to the foodstuffs, pharmaceuticals and cosmetics industries, and has interests in the fields of chromatography, nanotechnology, catalysis, and the production of building materials. The company leads the world in special titanium dioxide grades for printing inks and for the cosmetics, pharmaceuticals and food industries. The production facilities at all three locations apply the sophisticated sulfate-route process.

== History ==
Lithopone und Permanentweißfabrik Schöningen AG ("The Schöningen Lithopone and Permanent White Manufactory Corporation") was founded in 1878 for the production of a new white paint base on a zinc sulfide/barium sulfate basis. The fledgling company achieved success against competing products only after numerous technical and chemical problems had been overcome, a process in which the young chemist Rudolf Sachtleben played a decisive role. Lithopone, the world's first genuinely durable white paint base, then quickly began to replace the toxic white lead previously used.

Rudolf Sachtleben took over management of the company in 1883, becoming a partner in Sachtleben & Co. Lithopone Fabrik ("Sachtleben & Co. Lithopone Manufactory"), in Schöningen. The success of the new product, coupled with low-cost recovery of zinc by means of chlorinating roasting of iron pyrites from Meggen, in Germany's hilly Sauerland region, paved the way for rapid expansion. Sachtleben & Co. Lithopone Fabrik thus relocated to Duisburg in 1892, since the Rhine and the nearby Ruhr industrial region even then offered optimum conditions in terms of location, labor, transportation, and supplies of energy and water. By 1906, production had multiplied sixfold, and a second production plant had been constructed. Sachtleben, its workforce and its facilities also suffered from the effects of inflation and the global economic crises during the First World War, the immediate post-war period and the subsequent occupation of the Ruhr by French and Belgian troops in 1923.

Sachtleben Aktiengesellschaft für Bergbau und chemische Industrie ("Sachtleben Joint Stock Mining and Chemicals Corporation") was nonetheless founded in 1926, with a paid up capital stock of twelve million marks and registered offices in Cologne. Production of Lithopone grew significantly up to the outbreak of the Second World War in 1939, while new technologies helped to greatly expand the range of products. Lithopone was needed in Germany during the Second World War both for civil applications and for camouflage paints. Production ground to a halt following severe air-raids in 1944, however, and could be restarted only in 1946, after the repair of war-related damage. The superiority of the properties of titanium dioxide over those of Lithopone in many applications became apparent as early as the mid-1950s. For this reason, Sachtleben and DuPont de Nemours, of Wilmington, Delaware, USA, started a joint venture, Pigment Chemie GmbH, in 1959. Planning and construction of a titanium dioxide and a sulfuric acid plant started in 1960. Sachtleben subsequently began producing titanium dioxide using the sulfate-route process in Duisburg in 1962; annual production of titanium dioxide reached 18,000 tonnes the following year, and is now around 100,000 tonnes each at the Duisburg and Krefeld locations, plus some 130,000 tonnes at Pori, in Finland.

In 1973, Sachtleben decide to enter the highly promising water-treatment chemicals segment. The acquisition of EKOKEMI, of Ibbenbüren, and thus a simultaneous and comprehensive expansion of the product portfolio in the field of water chemicals, followed in 1996. Sachtleben then consolidated its position as one of Central Europe's leading flocculant producers with the start-up of Mitteldeutsche Wasserchemie (MIWAC; "Central German Water Chemicals") in 2000. Sachtleben's Water Chemicals division was hived off in the context of the joint venture between Sachtleben and Kemira Oyj in 2008, since the relevant agreement covered only the two companies' pigment production activities.

The year 2000 witnessed the construction of a nanotechnology production plant. Ultrafine titanium dioxide particles are used, among other applications, for UV-shielding both in the plastics, the paints and coatings, and the cosmetics industries. The plant is of modular design, enabling it to expand to meet market needs.

== Ownership ==
In 1972, Sachtleben was integrated entirely into Metallgesellschaft AG, the predecessor of mg technologies and the present-day GEA AG. Metallgesellschaft had been the majority shareholder since as early as 1926. Within Metallgesellschaft, Sachtleben became part of the Dynamit Nobel group, a 100% Metallgesellschaft subsidiary. Dynamit Nobel AG was responsible for chemicals activities within the overall Metallgesellschaft (mg technologies) group until 2004, when mg technologies AG divested itself of its chemicals interests, disposing of Dynamit Nobel AG to US specialty chemicals group Rockwood Holdings, Inc. (Princeton, USA). In September 2008, Rockwood Holdings, Inc. entered into a joint venture with Kemira Oyj, of Finland, combining Rockwood's titanium dioxide and functional additives activities (with production based in Duisburg, Germany) and Kemira's titanium dioxide business (with production at Pori, Finland). This joint venture immediately became one of the world's leading producers of titanium dioxide pigments. Production capacity for these specialties increased by a further 100,000 t/a, to 340,000 t/a, with the acquisition in 2012 of the facilities of the insolvent Crenox GmbH competitor, a former Bayer subsidiary, in Krefeld. Rockwood Holdings, Inc. acquired Kemira's stake in the joint venture in early 2013. Sachtleben is thus a 100% subsidiary of Rockwood Holdings, Inc. Sachtleben was then sold to the Huntsman Corporation in 2014; when Huntsman divested its pigment business in 2017 as Venator, Sachtleben became a part of this company.

== Revenue breakdown ==
Global revenue breakdown (2012):

- ≈ 55% Europe
- ≈ 20% Asia /Pacific
- ≈ 20% America
- ≈ 5 % Africa

== Locations ==
- Sachtleben Chemie GmbH, Duisburg, Germany
- Sachtleben Chemie GmbH, Pori, Finland
- Sachtleben Pigment GmbH Krefeld, Germany

== Sales offices and partners ==
- Duisburg
- New York – Sachtleben Corporation, White Plains, United States
- Shanghai – Sachtleben Chemie Shanghai, Shanghai, China
- Helsinki – Sachtleben Chemie GmbH, Helsinki, Finland
- 85 Agents and Distributors around the world
