= Schöningen site =

Archaeological site in Lower Saxony, Germany

The Schöningen site is an archaeological site at a mine in Lower Saxony, in Germany that has yielded significant Paleolithic artifacts dating to approximately 300,000 years ago. It is best known for the Schöningen spears, some of the oldest known wooden spears, found in the "spear horizon", although the site as a whole covers a broader span of time. The importance of the spears is that artifacts made of wood almost always decompose thoroughly, and their survival at this site enhances the importance of the discovery.

== Discovery and stratigraphy ==
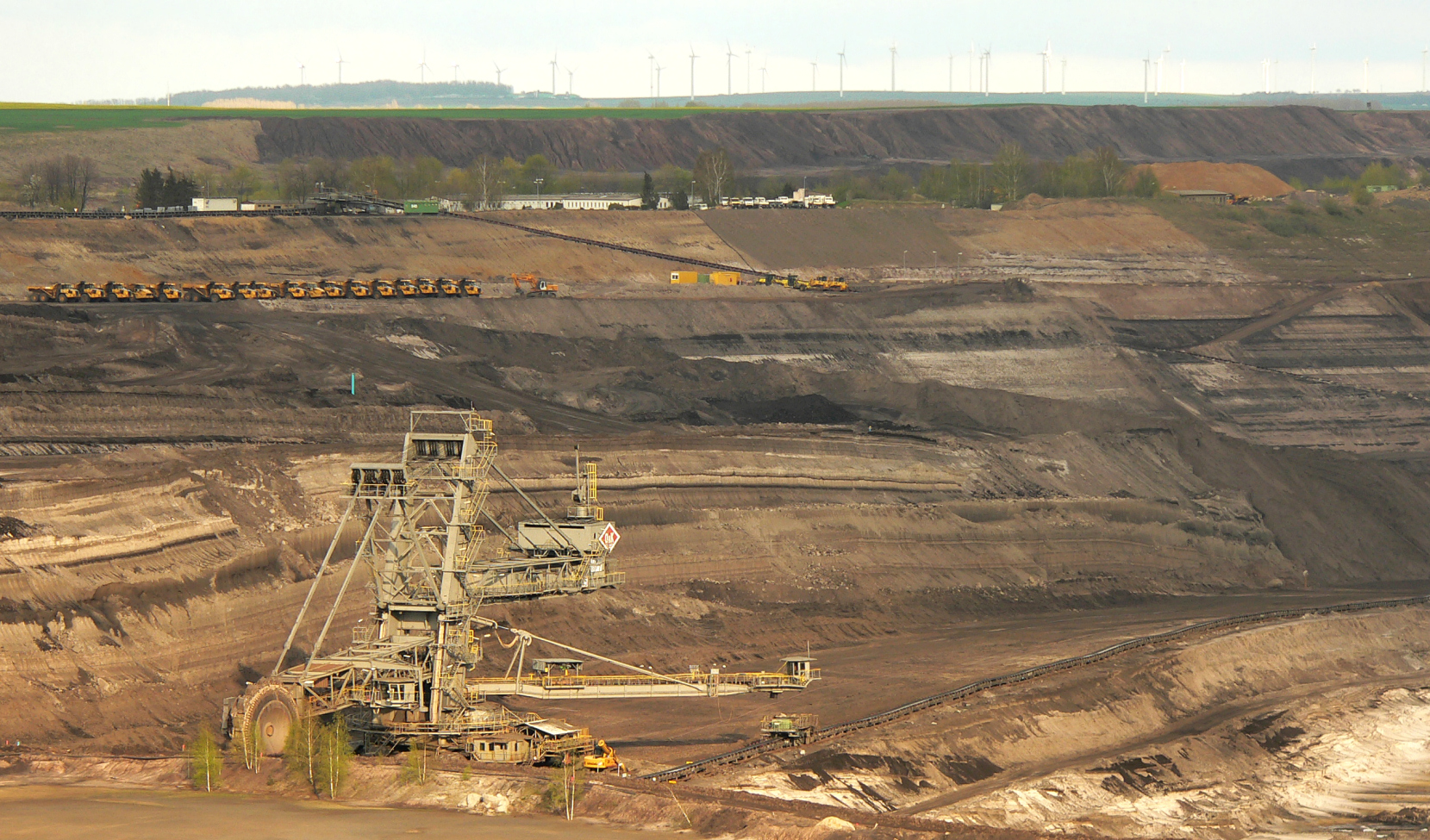
Photograph of the Schöningen mine in 2012

The site was initially excavated between 1994 and 1999, after having been found at an overcast mine near Schöningen in Lower Saxony, Germany. The depositional environment of the findings is thought to have been a lakeshore, with thermoluminescence dating and uranium–thorium dating suggesting an age of the site of approximately 300,000 years ago, during an interglacial period corresponding to Marine Isotope Stage 9. A 2025 study of the spears has suggested a younger age of approximately 200,000 years ago during MIS 7 for the Spear horizon.

=== Spear horizon (13 II-4) ===
At the level entitled the "spear horizon", referred to within the stratigraphic sequence as Schöningen 13 II-4, numerous remains (representing 20-25 individuals) of butchered horses belonging to the extinct species Equus mosbachensis have been found associated with wooden spears (the famous Schöningen spears), among the oldest known wooden spears; other wood tools, including throwing sticks likely also used in hunting, as well as split woods with pointed and rounded ends have also been found at the site. The split wood tools were likely used in domestic activities such as processing hide.

Other animals found in this layer do not display evidence of butchery and likely accumulated naturally; these include: red deer, roe deer, European wild ass, aurochs, steppe bison, wild boar, Irish elk, Merck's rhinoceros , the narrow-nosed rhinoceros, straight-tusked elephant, grey wolves, red foxes, stoats, least weasels, and the sabretooth cat Homotherium (among the youngest records of this genus in Eurasia), along with the European beaver and the extinct giant beaver Trogontherium, with small mammals including water voles, pygmy shrews, desmans, the European mole, the Narrow-headed, tundra, short-tailed field, common, European pine, European water and bank voles, along with the Norway lemming.

This layer is suggested to have been deposited in a steppe environment with mild summers and winters colder than those in the contemporary environment at the site today. The research indicates that the lakeshore was covered by sedges and surrounded by willow and birch swamp forest, while the surrounding steppe environment had scattered pine and larch trees, and had juniper shrubs.

=== Elephant butchery site ===
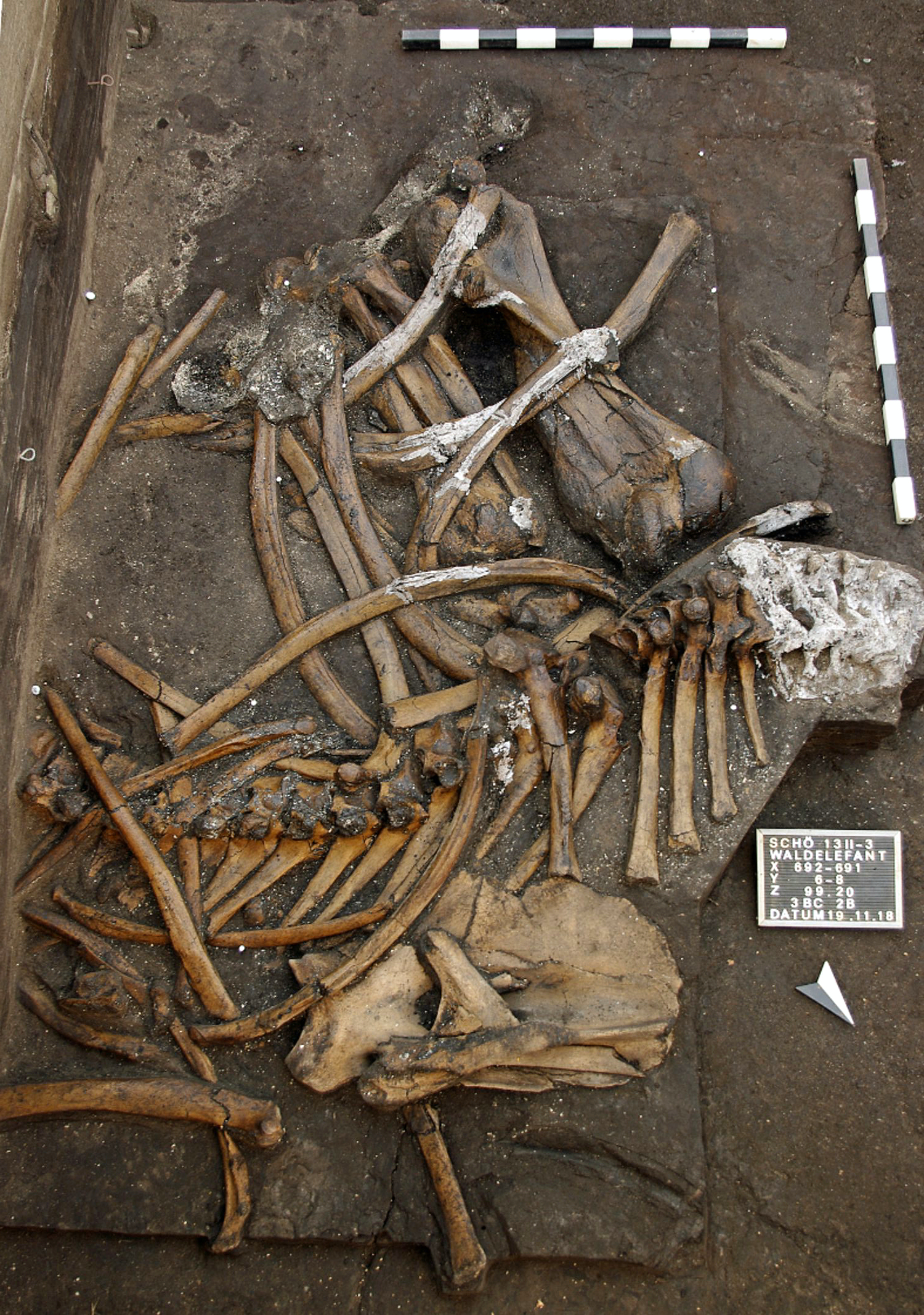
In situ bones of the butchered adult female straight-tusked elephant from layer 13 II-3

At layer 13 II-3, which is below the spear horizon in the stratigraphy, a mostly complete skeleton of an adult female (approximately 50-year-old) straight-tusked elephant was found, which was found with natural fragments of flint that have wear indicating they were used to butcher the elephant. The site displays no evidence of hunting and it is suggested that the elephant died of natural causes and afterward, was scavenged by humans. The P. antiquus individual had a shoulder height of approximately 3.2 m (10 ft) and weighed around 6.8 tons. During the excavation, 300 bones and a total of 700 bone parts were recovered, spread over an area of approximately 64 m^{2} (690 sq ft). The finds include the 2.3 meter long tusks, the lower jaw, vertebrae and ribs, as well as the bones of three legs and the entire hyoid bone. The skeletal parts were largely in an anatomically-correct arrangement. Various parts were missing, such as the pelvis, the left front leg with the shoulder blade and the foot bones of two legs. The preservation of the bones is mostly very good; only the more than one meter high skull of the individual had disintegrated into hundreds of small parts due to the honeycomb-like nature of the skull. Overall, the animal lay parallel to the former lake shore with the head in the north and the rear in the south.
