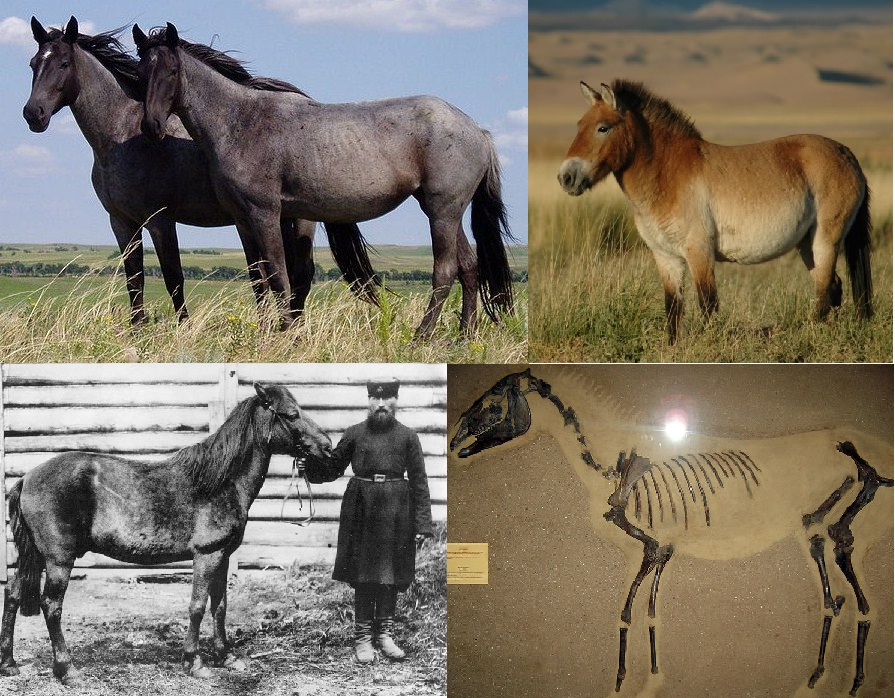
- Top left: Equus ferus caballus (horses); Top right: Equus ferus przewalskii (Przewalski's horse) Below left: Equus ferus ferus† (tarpan); Below right: Equus ferus fossil from 9100 BC

Conservation status
- Endangered (IUCN 3.1)

Scientific classification
- Kingdom: Animalia
- Phylum: Chordata
- Class: Mammalia
- Order: Perissodactyla
- Family: Equidae
- Genus: Equus
- Subgenus: Equus
- Species: E. ferus

Binomial name
- Equus ferus Boddaert, 1785

Subspecies
- †Equus ferus ferus; Equus ferus przewalskii; Equus ferus caballus
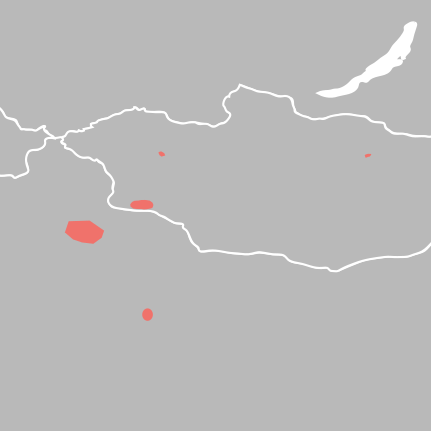
- Equus ferus przewalskii distribution

= Wild horse =

Wild horse Temporal range: earliest Middle Pleistocene-Recent 0.8–0 Ma

Species of equine

The wild horse (Equus ferus) is a species of the genus Equus, which includes as subspecies the modern domesticated horse (Equus ferus caballus) and the endangered Przewalski's horse (Equus ferus przewalskii, sometimes treated as a separate species, i.e., Equus przewalskii). The European wild horse, also known as the tarpan, that went extinct in the late 19th or early 20th century, has previously been treated as the nominate subspecies of wild horse, Equus ferus ferus, but more recent studies have cast doubt on whether tarpans were truly wild or if they actually were feral horses or hybrids.

Other subspecies of Equus ferus may have existed and could have been the stock from which domesticated horses are descended. Przewalski's horse had reached the brink of extinction, but was reintroduced successfully into the wild. The tarpan became extinct in the 19th century, but is theorized to have been present on the steppes of Eurasia at the time of domestication. Since the extinction of the tarpan, attempts have been made to reconstruct its phenotype using domestic horses, resulting in horse breeds such as the Heck horse. However, the genetic makeup and foundation bloodstock of those breeds is substantially derived from domesticated horses, so these breeds possess domesticated traits.

The term "wild horse" is also used colloquially in reference to free-roaming herds of feral horses; for example, the mustang in the United States, and the brumby in Australia. These feral horses are untamed members of the domestic horse (Equus ferus caballus), not to be confused with the truly "wild" horse subspecies extant into modern times.

== Distribution ==
Wild horses were formerly widespread across the Old World during the Late Pleistocene and early Holocene, occurring from Western Europe and North Africa (where remains are referred to as Equus algericus), to the far north of Siberia (where they are referred to as Equus lenensis) to East Asia. Today the only living wild horse subspecies, Przewalski's horse, which was formerly extinct in the wild, has been reintroduced to small areas spanning from its former distribution in northeast China, Mongolia and Kazakhstan, as well as areas outside of its historical distribution, including Spain.

== Description ==
Across time and space, wild horses show considerable variability in body size and limb dimensions, likely as adaptations to local environmental and climatic conditions. The living Przewalski's horse has an estimated body mass of 250–360 kilograms (550–790 lb), though the body mass of Przewalski's horse varies considerably according to rhythmic annual cycles. Some extinct wild horse populations are thought to have been considerably larger, with some Pleistocene European wild horses (including those assigned to Equus (ferus) mosbachensis and Equus (ferus) latipes) suggested to have body masses of around 500–607 kilograms (1,102–1,338 lb).^{ST2} Earlier Middle Pleistocene horses (such as those assigned to E. (ferus) mosbachensis) differ from later ones in some aspects of the anatomy of the limbs and teeth.

== Ecology ==
Wild horses show considerable environmental tolerances, having historically inhabited environments ranging from temperate forest to steppe (including the prehistoric mammoth steppe biome) and tundra, though in general they tend to show a preference for open environments. Horses are typically considered to be grazers. They may have seasonal food preferences, as seen in the Przewalski's horse, which historically consumed browse like shrubs during the winter months due to being forced into suboptimal habitat by human pressure. Some extinct Pleistocene wild horse populations that inhabited forested environments show dental wear suggesting them to have been mixed feeders or even predominantly browsers during certain times of the year, though this may be reflecting the consumption of low growing forbs rather than shrubs.

Wild horses live in herds with a social hierarchy, formed by a dominant adult male or sometimes multiple males (harem stallions), as well as several mares and their offspring. The harem stallion aggressively defends his herd/harem against rival males. Upon reaching adulthood, both male and female horses disperse to other herds to avoid inbreeding, with young adult males also forming bachelor groups when they are around 3 years of age. In bachelor groups male horses engage in play and ritual behaviour, with the group forming a hierarchy. Mare Przewalski's horses tend to begin giving birth around 3 years of age, with a gestation period of around 12 months, primarily giving birth in the spring or summer. Przewalski's stallions generally leave bachelor groups to begin breeding at around 5–6 years of age.

In modern times the main predator of wild horses in Eurasia are wolves, though during the Pleistocene they had other predators such as cave hyenas.

== Subspecies and their history ==
E. ferus has had several subspecies; those which survived into modern times are:

- The domesticated horse (Equus ferus caballus).
- The Eurasian wild horse (Equus ferus ferus), incorrectly listed as Equus caballus ferus in MSW 3; originally considered synonymous with the tarpan, though recent research has cast doubt on this. Horses identified as tarpans were found in Europe and western Asia before the last surviving animals —possibly hybrids by that time — became effectively extinct in the late 19th century. The last specimen died in 1909 whilst in captivity in an estate in Poltava Governorate, Russian Empire.
- Przewalski's horse (Equus ferus przewalskii), incorrectly listed as Equus caballus przewalskii in MSW 3; also known as the Mongolian wild horse or takhi, it is native to Central Asia and the Gobi Desert. It is sometimes considered its own species, Equus przewalskii.

The latter two are the only never-domesticated "wild" groups that survived into historic times. However, other subspecies of Equus ferus may have existed.

In the Late Pleistocene epoch, there were several other subspecies of E. ferus which have all since gone extinct. The exact categorization of Equus remains into species or subspecies is a complex matter and the subject of ongoing work.

== Evolutionary history and taxonomy ==
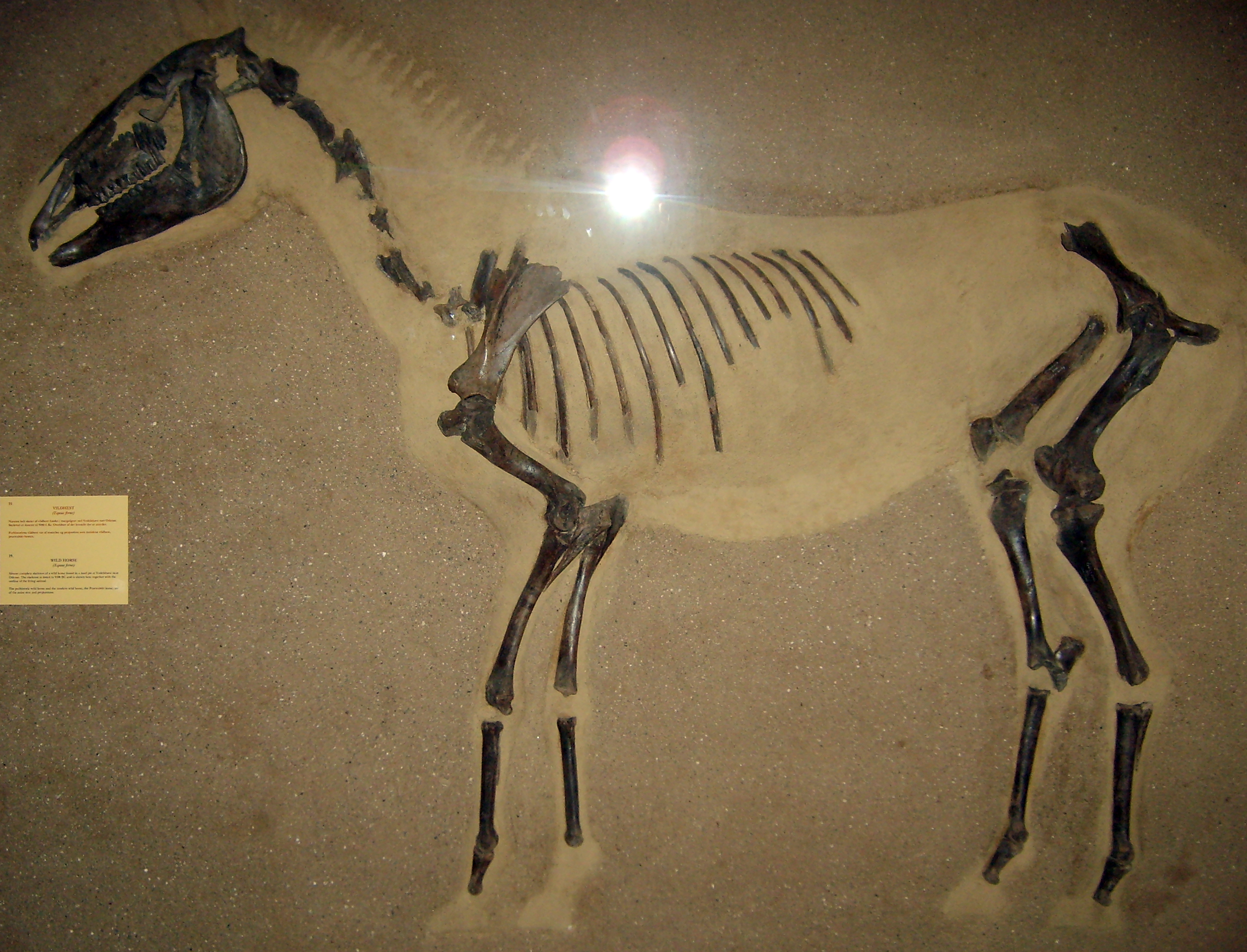
Equus ferus fossil from 9100 BC found near Odense, at the Zoological Museum in Copenhagen

The horse family Equidae evolved in North America, with the genus Equus appearing on the continent during the Pliocene (5.3-2.6 million years ago). Horses are thought to have diverged from the ancestors of zebras and asses around 4 million years ago. Around 900–800,000 years ago, at the Early-Middle Pleistocene boundary, the ancestors of Eurasian wild horses crossed over the Bering Land Bridge from North America. Early horses in Eurasia are referred to species like Equus mosbachensis. North American caballine horses, which genetic evidence has confirmed are closely related to Eurasian horses, would persist on the continent until they became extinct as part of the end-Pleistocene extinction event along with most other large mammals in the Americas (including other equines like Haringtonhippus and Hippidion) around 12,000 years ago. North American caballine wild horse remains are referred to various species such as Equus scotti and Equus lambei though the true number of species is uncertain, with some authors treating all North American horses as part of E. ferus. Ancient DNA analysis suggests North American horses were largely genetically distinct from Eurasian horses, with limited and intermittent interbreeding between the two populations following the initial dispersal across the Bering Land Bridge. Equus neogeus from the Pleistocene of South America may also represent a lineage of true caballine horses.

Currently, three subspecies that lived during recorded human history are recognized. One subspecies is the widespread domestic horse (Equus ferus caballus), as well as two wild subspecies: the recently extinct European wild horse (E. f. ferus) and the endangered Przewalski's horse (E. f. przewalskii). A 2015 study determined that the Przewalski and domesticated horse lineages diverged from a common ancestor about 45,000 years ago.

Genetically, the pre-domestication horse, E. ferus, and the domesticated horse, E. caballus, form a single homogeneous group (clade) and are genetically indistinguishable from each other. The genetic variation within this clade shows only a limited regional variation, with the notable exception of Przewalski's horse. Przewalski's horse has several unique genetic differences that distinguish it from the other subspecies, including 66 instead of 64 chromosomes, unique Y-chromosome gene haplotypes, and unique mtDNA haplotypes.

Besides genetic differences, osteological evidence from across the Eurasian wild horse range, based on cranial and metacarpal differences, indicates the presence of only two subspecies in postglacial times, the tarpan and Przewalski's horse. A study in 2011 of DNA from bones of pre-domestication horses found that all were either bay, black or leopard-spotted.

=== Scientific naming of the species ===
In some sources including MSW 3 (2005), the domesticated and wild horses were considered a single species, with the valid scientific name for such a single horse species being Equus ferus, although MSW erroneously used E. caballus for this (enlarged) taxon on account of a mis-interpretation of the then-recent ICZN ruling on the matter, refer Groves & Grubb, 2011. The wild tarpan subspecies is E. f. ferus, Przewalski's horse is E. f. przewalskii, while the domesticated horse is nowadays normally (but not exclusively) treated as a separate species E. caballus. The rules for the scientific naming of animal species are determined in the International Code of Zoological Nomenclature, which stipulates that the oldest available valid scientific name is used to name the species. Previously, when taxonomists considered domesticated and wild horse two subspecies of the same species, the valid scientific name was Equus caballus Linnaeus 1758, with the subspecies labeled E. c. caballus (domesticated horse), E. c. ferus Boddaert, 1785 (tarpan) and E. c. przewalskii Poliakov, 1881 (Przewalski's horse). However, in 2003, the International Commission on Zoological Nomenclature decided that the scientific names of the wild species have priority over the scientific names of domesticated species, therefore mandating the use of Equus ferus for both the wild and the domesticated horse if the two taxa are considered conspecific.

=== Przewalski's horse ===
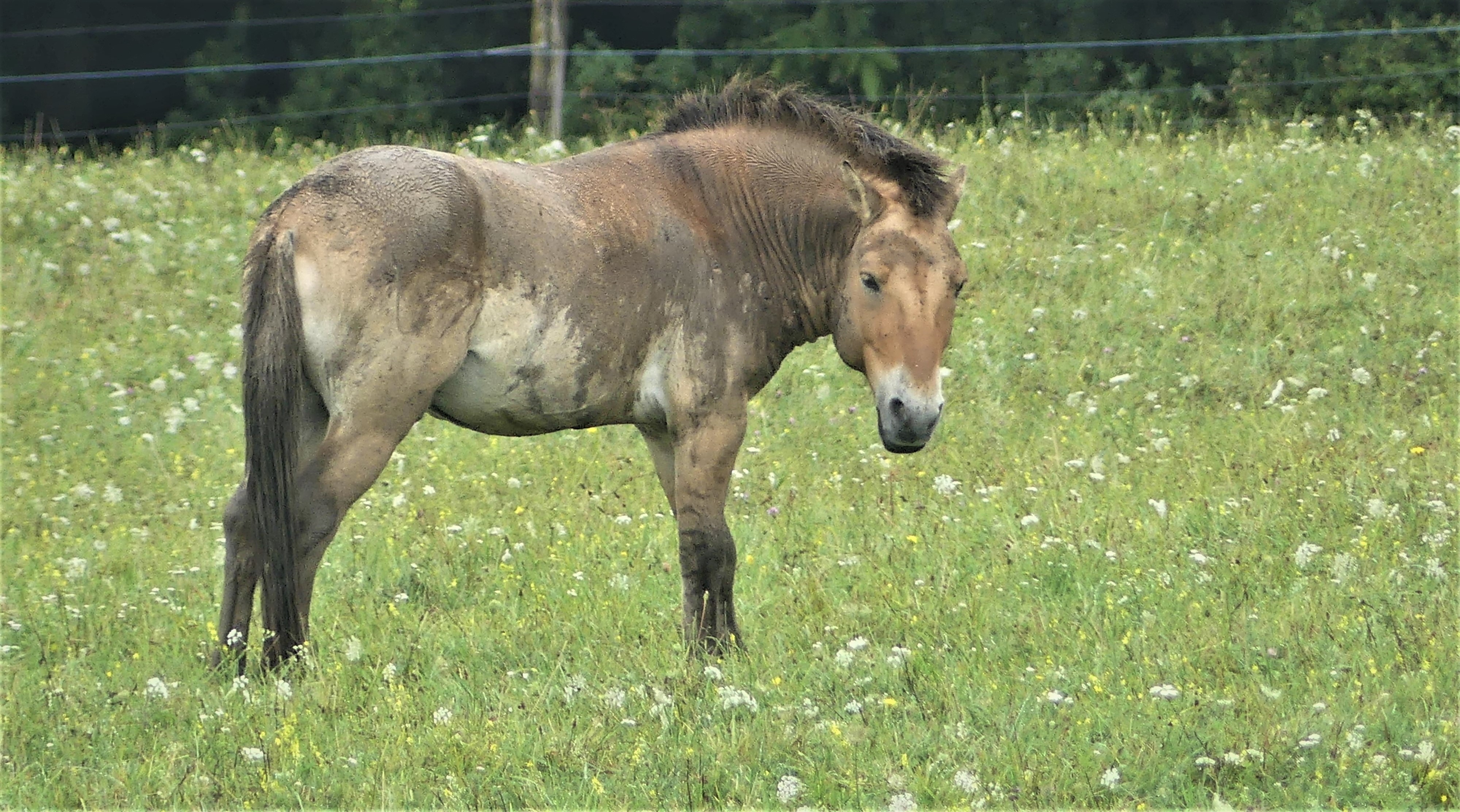
Przewalski's horse in Hungary

Przewalski's horse occupied the eastern Eurasian Steppes, perhaps from the Ural Mountains to Mongolia, although the ancient border between tarpan and Przewalski's distributions has not been clearly defined. Przewalski's horse was limited to Dzungaria and western Mongolia in the same period, and became extinct in the wild during the 1960s, but was reintroduced in the late 1980s to two preserves in Mongolia. Although earlier researchers such as Marija Gimbutas theorized that the horses of the Chalcolithic period were Przewalski's, a 2003 study indicated that the Przewalski's horse is not an ancestor to modern domesticated horses.

In 2018, a DNA study revealed that the horses raised for meat and milk by the Botai culture 5500 years ago were Przewalski's horses. The paper claims specifically that modern Przewalski's horses are the feral descendents of the domesticated Botai horse, although it is also possible both groups could have descended separately from the same ancient wild Przewalski's horses.

Przewalski's horse is still found today, though it is an endangered species and for a time was considered extinct in the wild. Roughly 2000 Przewalski's horses are in zoos around the world. A small breeding population has been reintroduced in Mongolia. As of 2005, a cooperative venture between the Zoological Society of London and Mongolian scientists has resulted in a population of 248 animals in the wild.

Przewalski's horse has some biological differences from the domestic horse; unlike domesticated horses and the tarpan, which both have 64 chromosomes, Przewalski's horse has 66 chromosomes due to a Robertsonian translocation. However, the offspring of Przewalski and domestic horses are fertile, possessing 65 chromosomes.

== Feral horses ==
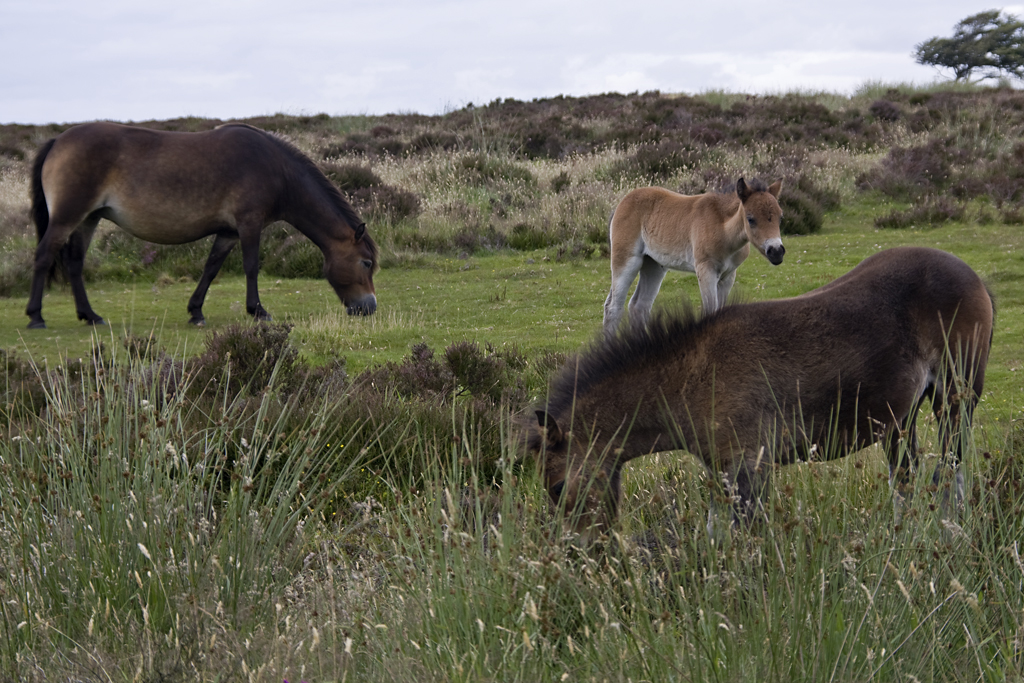
Semi-feral Exmoor ponies. Though popularly called "wild" horses, feral and semi-feral horses had ancestors that were domesticated.

Horses that live in an untamed state but have ancestors that have been domesticated are called "feral horses". For instance, when the Spanish reintroduced the horse to the Americas, beginning in the late 15th century, some horses escaped, forming feral herds; the best-known being the mustang. Similarly, the brumby descended from horses strayed or let loose in Australia by English settlers. Isolated populations of feral horses occur in a number of places, including Bosnia, Croatia, New Zealand, Portugal, Scotland and a number of barrier islands along the Atlantic coast of North America from Sable Island off Nova Scotia, to Cumberland Island, off the coast of Georgia. Even though these are often referred to as "wild" horses, they are not truly "wild" if wildness is defined as having no domesticated ancestors.

In 1995, British and French explorers encountered a new population of horses in the Riwoche Valley of Tibet, unknown to the rest of the world, but apparently used by the local Khamba people. It was speculated that the Riwoche horse might be a relict population of wild horses, but testing did not reveal genetic differences with domesticated horses, which is in line with news reports indicating that they are used as pack and riding animals by the local villagers. These horses only stand 12 hands (48 inches, 122 cm) tall and are said to resemble the images known as "horse no 2" depicted in cave paintings alongside images of Przewalski's horse.

== Relationship with humans ==
Archaic humans hunted horses hundreds of thousands of years before the dispersal of modern humans across Eurasia during the Last Glacial Period. Examples of sites demonstrating horse butchery by archaic humans include the Boxgrove site in southern England dating to around 500,000 years ago, where horse bones with cut marks (with a horse scapula possibly exhibiting a spear wound) are associated with Acheulean stone tools made by Homo heidelbergensis, the Schöningen site in Germany (also thought to have been created by Homo heidelbergensis) dating to around 300,000 years ago, where butchered horses are associated with wooden spears (the Schöningen spears, amongst the oldest known wooden spears), as well as the Lingjing site in Henan, China dating to 125–90,000 years ago. During the Upper Palaeolithic, there is evidence for the hunting of horses by modern humans in Europe, as well as Asia. Early Paleoindians in North America hunted the continent's native horses shortly prior to their extinction. During the 3rd millennium BC, horses were domesticated on the western Eurasian steppes, with domestic horses spreading across Eurasia around 2000 BC.

== See also ==
- Horse behavior
- Domestication of the horse
