= Caroline Oltmanns =

German concert pianist and pedagogue

Caroline Oltmanns (born May 21, 1962 in Fürth) is a German concert pianist and pedagogue. She serves as Head of the Piano Department at the Dana School of Music, Youngstown State University.

== Early life and education ==
Caroline Oltmanns was born in Fürth, Bavaria, Germany. She began studying the piano at home at the age of 3, and subsequently pursued conservatory studies with Helmut Schultes. From 1984-1989 she studied piano with Robert D. Levin at the Hochschule für Musik Freiburg. After winning a Fulbright Scholarship to study in the United States, she earned master's and doctoral degrees in Piano Performance at the University of Southern California.

== Career ==
=== Performance ===
Caroline Oltmanns has performed at venues throughout Germany, France, Switzerland, South Africa, and the United States. She has also appeared as concerto soloist with such orchestras as the Cleveland Philharmonic Orchestra, the Youngstown Symphony Orchestra, the Johnson City Symphony Orchestra, and the Harburger Orchester Academie.

Dr. Oltmanns' performances have appeared in radio and television broadcasts in Germany, South Africa, and the United States. She co-produced and performed in the concept project "Crumb Kaleidescope," This concert, based on George Crumb's work, included compositions by Oltmanns' husband James Wilding. It was performed at the Cultural Forum of Fürth, and later broadcast on Bayerischer Rundfunk

Caroline Oltmanns has released five solo CDs on the Filia Mundi label. Her most recent album, Venezia e Napoli, was released in 2014, and it features works by Debussy, Haydn, Liszt, and Beethoven.

Dr. Oltmanns is an International Steinway Artist.

=== Pedagogy ===
Caroline Oltmanns is a Professor of Piano at Youngstown State University, where she serves as Head of the Piano Department. She has also taught masterclasses and workshops in the United States, Switzerland, Germany, South Africa and Canada.

== Personal ==
Dr. Oltmanns resides in Hudson, Ohio, with her husband, composer James Wilding.
