= Reimar Oltmanns =

German author and journalist

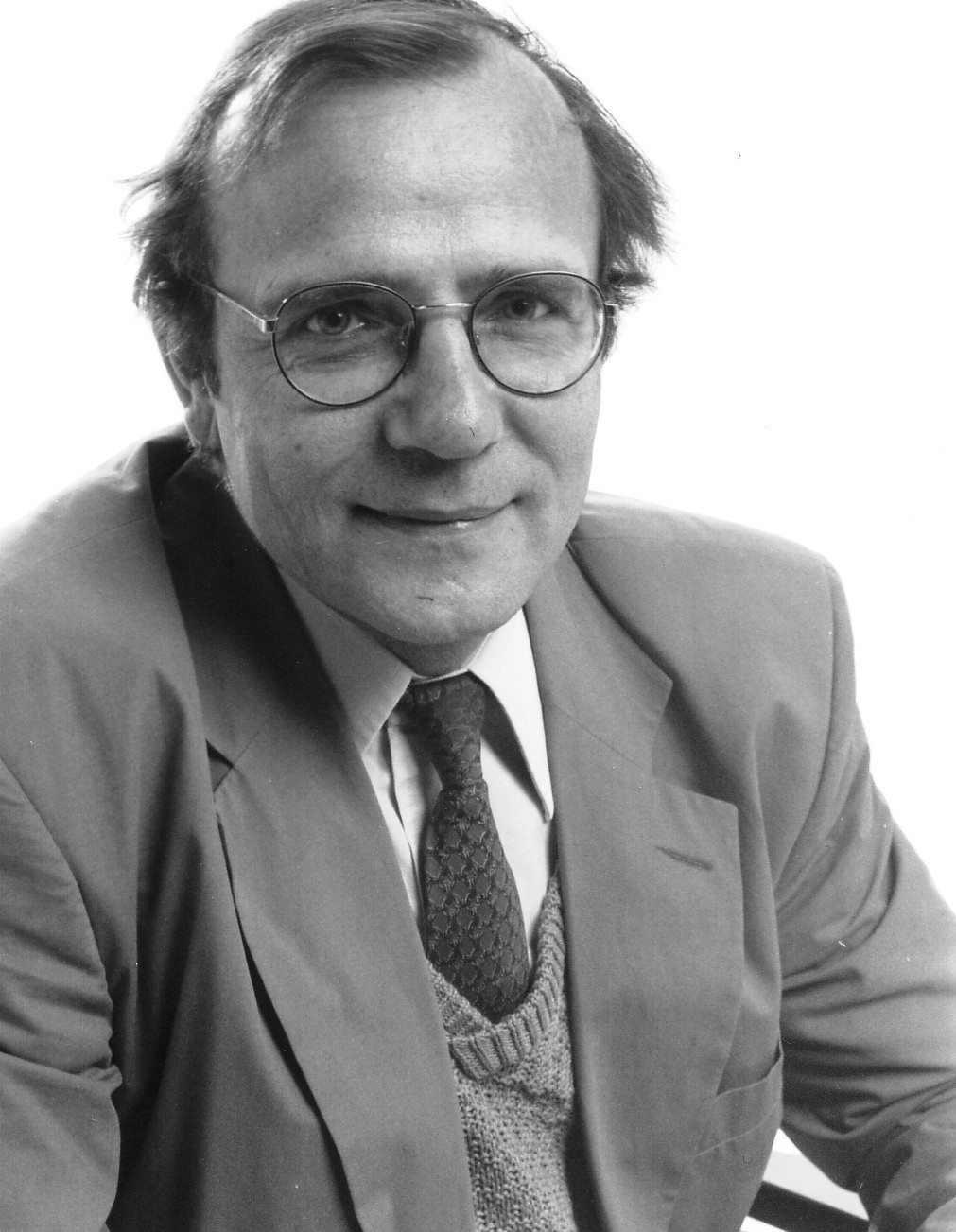
Reimar Oltmanns

Reimar Oltmanns (born 1949 in Schöningen, West Germany) is a well-known journalist and author in Germany.

From 1970 to 1972 he was the spokesman for Peter von Oertzen, Minister of Culture for the Lower Saxony region.

Until 1970, Reimar Oltmanns was involved in various capacities with the Lower Saxony Young Democrats; afterwards he became President of this youth organisation, closely linked at this time to the FDP. He was a delegate to the regional and national congresses of the FDP and sat on the regional committee, without voting rights. The regional committee of the FDP party, with right wing politicians as well as deported German nationals were in dispute with the young democrats who they considered too close to the left wing opposition. Together with twenty leaders of the Young Democrats, Oltmanns rejoined the SPD.

He learned his journalistic profession with the newspapers "Cuxhavener Zeitung" and "Hannoversche Presse". At the start of the 1970s he wrote from Hanover for the "Frankfurter Rundschau" and later from Bonn for "Stern". At the same time he also wrote for "Stern" on German politics, and as chief editor on "Special Themes".

His teachers and mentors have included the professors Peter von Oertzen (*1929+2008) and Peter Brückner (*1922+1982) and the seniors editors, Karl-Hermann Flach (*1929+1973) of the Frankfurter Rundschau and Arnim von Manikowsky (*1928+2007) by Stern magazine n Hamburg.

In July 1977, Reimar Oltmanns (text) et John Kubicek (illustration) won first prize in a national competition under the theme of "30 years of Human Rights." Their entry, "So the burning of the Reichstag will never happen again" showed a wall of flames devouring the books of fundamental law.

25 years later, "Stern" magazine chose articles written by Reimar Oltmanns for their special editions dedicated to "The best reporting of 1977". The series of articles were written from Latin America on the subjects of torture, assassinations and concentration camps.

In March 1979, Reimar, together with Peter Koch, received the Egon-Erwin-Kisch Prize 1978, awarded by the established youth magazines "Elan" and "die roten Blätter" and supported by the German Democratic Republic. The prize was awarded for their articles on freedom published in "Stern". This series of articles criticised the systematic development of electronic monitoring by the State, the exclusion and professional disqualification of those who deviated from the dominant thought.

In 1979, Reimar Oltmanns left the Hamburg-based magazine and became a freelance journalist and writer, reporting for "Spiegel" as well as "Der Zeit".

In 1981, Reimar testified at the Hamburg High Court in the "trial of press coverage" ("Titelblattprozess") during which the feminist Alice Schwarzer accused the editor of the Stern, Henri Nannen, of censorship and of representing women like simple sex objects. Reimar Oltmanns testified in favor of Alice Schwarzer, editor of Emma, from his inside knowledge of Stern.

After having gone to live in Frankfurt-on-Main, he continued to write for newspapers and magazines and published several books. He was in the years 1984/85, the editor of the magazine Auftritt in the Rhine-Hand area. In 1990, he moved Bologna (Italy) and since 1992-2009 has lived in France. Reimar Oltmanns lives now in Innsbruck (Austria). In recognition of his socially descriptions and books contributed to Reimar Oltmanns on 16 July 2009 in the Golden book of his hometown Schöningen. Since 12 January 2012 he is a supporting member outdoors Radio Helsinki in Graz/Styria; since 2013 as a writer in Innsbruck. Two years later he moved to Germany in the Holstein Switzerland back.

He also reported from Latin America, Africa and Eastern Europe. In Western Europe, particularly in Italy and France, he wrote documentary articles about society and about travel.

== Works ==
- "Ein Lehrer muß die Ehe achten" In Herbert Nagel: "wer will die klügsten kinder? - vorschulerziehung und chancengleichheit", Rowohlt Taschenbuch Verlag, Reinbek bei Hamburg, Dezember 1973, ISBN 3-499-16837-5
- "Die Würde des Menschen – Folter in unserer Zeit", with Peter Koch, Verlag Gruner + Jahr AG & Co, Hamburg 1977,ISBN 3-570-00061-3
- "SOS – Sicherheit – Ordnung Staatsgewalt – Freiheit in Deutschland", with Peter Koch, Verlag Gruner + Jahr AG & Co, Hamburg 1978, ISBN 3-570-01909-8
- "Du hast keine Chance, aber nutze sie – Eine Jugend steigt aus", Rowohlt Verlag, Reinbek bei Hamburg 1980, ISBN 3-498-05006-0
- "Am Strand von Tunix" dans "Erkundungen in einem unbekannten Land - Sozialreportagen von 1945 bis heute" Friedrich G. Kürbisch (Hrsg.) Verlag J.H.W. Dietz Nachf..Berlin, Bonn 1981, ISBN 3-8012-0060-4
- "Deutschland von übermorgen" in "Aussteigen oder rebellieren - Jugendliche gegen Staat und Gesellschaft" Michael Haller (Hrsg.) Spiegel-Verlag, Hamburg 1981, ISBN 3-499-33014-8
- "Die Krise der Familie." In: Franz Decker (Hrsg.). "Wirklichkeiten Lese- und Arbeitsbuch." Ferdinand Schöningh, Paderborn 1982, ISBN 3-506-28401-0
- "Heimatkunde – Soldaten, Arbeitslose, Verrückte und andere Mitmenschen - Deutsche Reportagen" Eichborn Verlag, Frankfurt am Main 1982, ISBN 3-8218-1103-X
- "Du hast keine Chance, aber nutze sie - Eine Jugend steigt aus." In: Werner Lindner (Hrsg.): 1964-2004: "Vierzig Jahre Kinder- und Jugendarbeit in Deutschland: Aufbruch, Aufstieg und neue Ungewissheit." VS Verlag für Sozislwissenschaften/GWV Fachverlage GmbH, Wiesbaden 2006, ISBN 3-531-14620-3
- "Engagiert und ernsthaft, spielerisch und experimentell. Die Wirtschaft der alternativen Szene" in "Wirtschaft im Untergrund" Stephan Burgdorff (Hrsg.) Spiegel-Verlag, Hamburg 1983, ISBN 3-499-33035-0
- "Der Intrigant oder die Machtgier der christlichen Regenten - Vom Hofe der Bonner Operetten-Republik" Eichborn Verlag, Frankfurt am Main 1986, ISBN 3-8218-1121-8 (a critique of Ulrich Karger)
- "Möllemänner - oder die opportunistischen Liberalen" Eichborn Verlag, Frankfurt am Main 1988, ISBN 3-8218-1122-6
- "Keine normale Figur in der Hütte – Reportagen zur Wendezeit" Athenäum Verlag, Frankfurt am Main 1989, ISBN 3-610-08538-X
- "Frauen an die Macht – Protokolle einer Aufbruchsära" Athenäums Programm by anton hain, Frankfurt am Main 1990, ISBN 3-445-08551-X
- "Vive la Francaise – Die stille Revolution der Frauen in Frankreich" Rasch und Röhring Verlag, Hamburg 1995, ISBN 3-89136-523-3
- "Gewalt in den Familien. Ein Problem in Frankreich." In: Anita Heiliger: "Männergewalt gegen Frauen beenden." Leske + Budrich Verlag, Wiesbaden 2000, ISBN 3-8100-2652-2
- "Spurensuche auf verbrannter Erde - Reportagen, Berichte, Erzählungen zur Zeitgeschichte - Deutschland, Europa, Südamerika, Asien, Afrika (1969-2009)." Herstellung und Verlag: Books on Demand GmbH, Norderstedt 2009,ISBN 978-3-8391-0258-9
- " Kein schöner Land in dieser Zeit. Verlorene Illusionen - Reportagen, Berichte, Porträts, Erzählungen zur Zeitgeschichte. Band 1 (1969-1979)." Books-on-Demand, Norderstedt 2010, ISBN 978-3-8423-3294-2
- " Kein schöner Land in dieser Zeit. Verlorene Illusionen - Reportagen, Berichte, Porträts, Erzählungen zur Zeitgeschichte. Band 2 (1980-2010)." Books-on-Demand, Norderstedt 2010, ISBN 978-3-8423-3313-0
- "Männer-Macht im Treibhaus der Bonner Republik der siebziger Jahre." In: Ursula Kosser "Hammelsprünge - Sex und Macht in der Deutschen Politik" DuMont Buchverlag, Köln 2012, ISBN 978-3-8321-9656-1
- "Reporter-Leben. Keine Zeit für Angst und Tränen. Das Fremde wird nah, die Nähe fremd. Kein Ort - nirgendwo." Autobiografie. tredition-Verlag, Hamburg 2015, Hardcover ISBN 978-3-7323-5491-7, Paperback ISBN 978-3-7323-5490-0
- "Keine Zeit für Wut und Tränen. Das Fremde wird nah, die Nähe fremd." Autobiografie. epubli-Verlag, Berlin 2017, ISBN 978-3-7450-0420-5
- "Der Kater lässt das Mausen nicht. Wenn der Humor verhungert." In cooperation by Helga Möller-Tallay. epubli-Verlag, Berlin 2018 ISBN 978-3-746736-14-3
- "Kopfsteinpflaster. Reportagen.Porträts aus vier Jahrzehnten. epubli-Verlag, Berlin 2019 ISBN 978-3-750259-21-8
- "Kein Land nirgendwo - verblichen, vergessen, verschollen." Reportagen. epubli-Verlag, Berlin 2020, ISBN 978-3-750259-21-8
- "Melancholie am Nord-Ostsee-Kanal." Essay. epubli-Verlag, Berlin 2021, ISBN 978-3-754155-01-1
- "Keine Zeit für Wut und Tränen. Das Fremde wird nah, die Nähe fremd." Autobiografie. Taschenbuch. Band I. epubli-Verlag, Berlin 2022, (ISBN 978-3-754975-73-2)
- "Keine Zeit für Wut und Tränen. Das Fremde wird nah, die Nähe fremd." Autobiografie. Taschenbuch. Band II. epubli-Verlag, Berlin 2022, (ISBN 978-3-754976-10-4)
