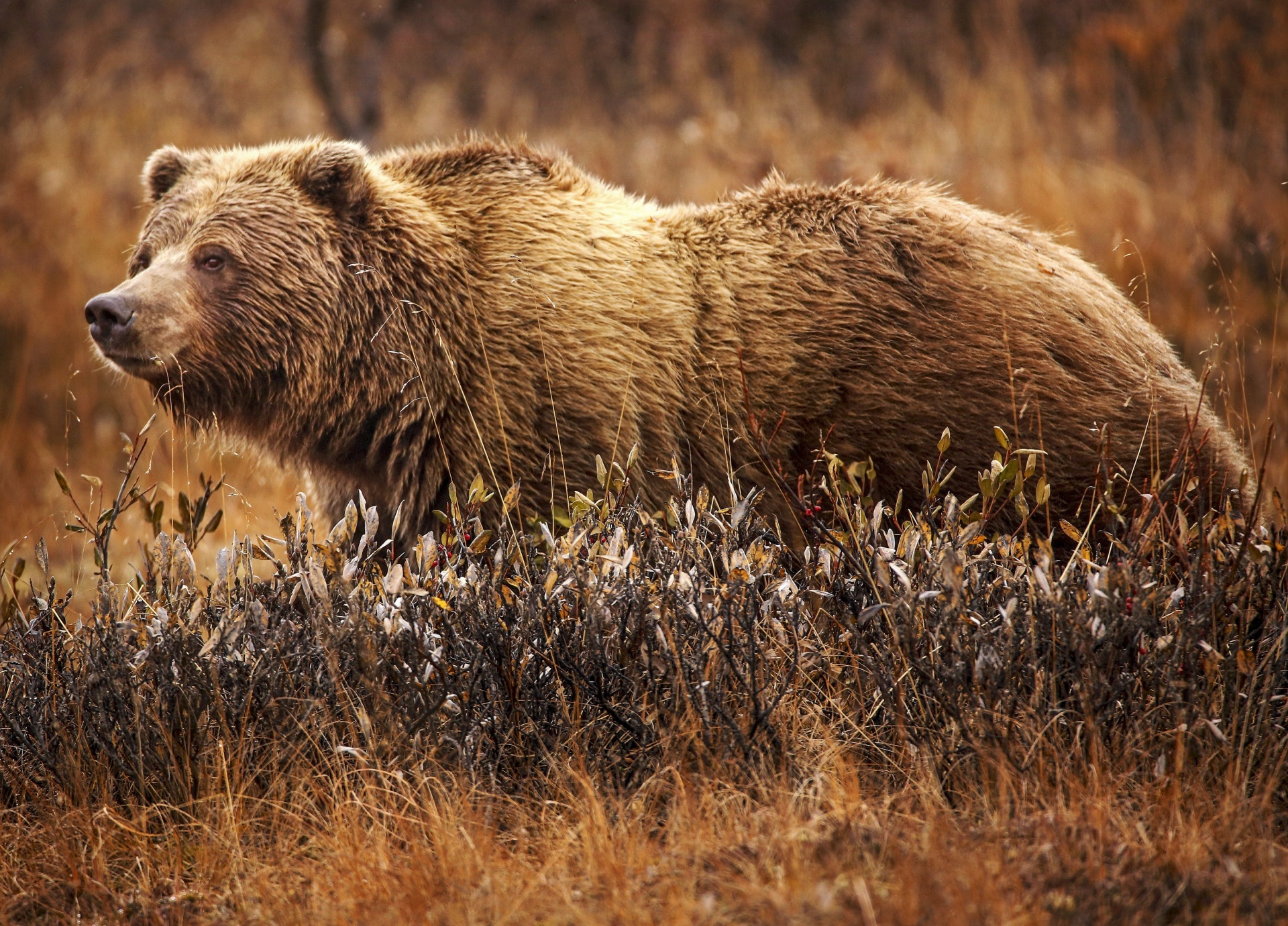

Conservation status
- Apparently Secure (NatureServe)

Scientific classification
- Kingdom: Animalia
- Phylum: Chordata
- Class: Mammalia
- Order: Carnivora
- Family: Ursidae
- Genus: Ursus
- Species: U. arctos
- Subspecies: U. a. horribilis

Trinomial name
- Ursus arctos horribilis (Ord, 1815)

Possibly synonymous subspecies
- U. a. californicus†; U. a. dalli; U. a. gyas; U. a. middendorffi; U. a. sitkensis; U. a. stikeenensis
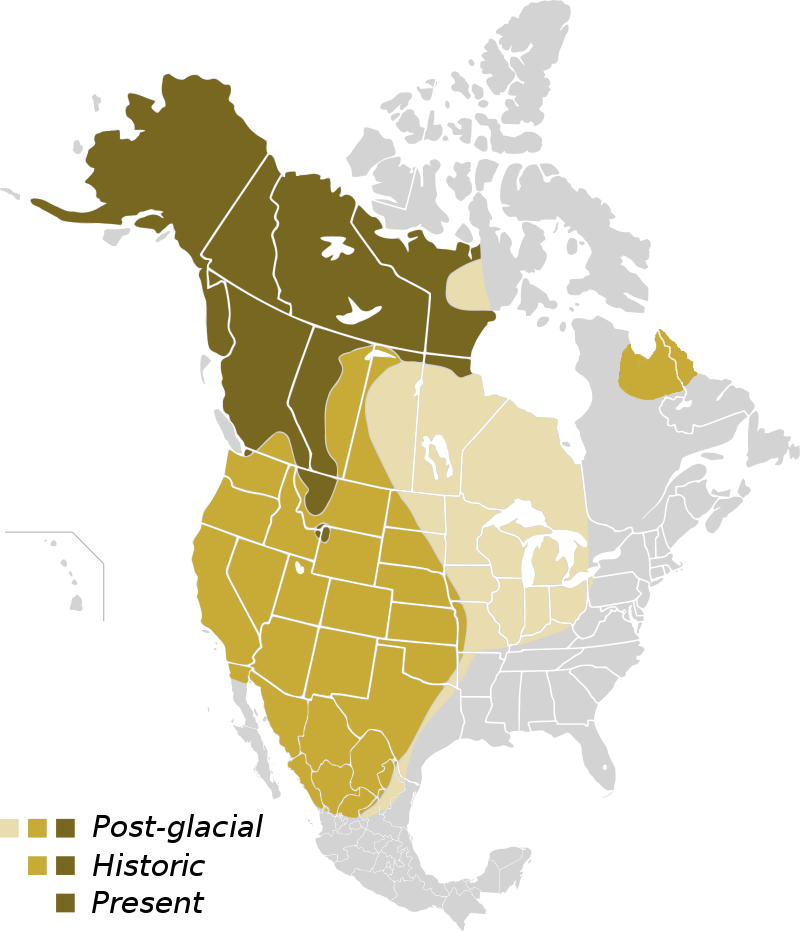
- Historic and present range

= Grizzly bear =

Grizzly bear Temporal range: Late Pleistocene – present (~45,000–0 YBP)

Subspecies of brown bear

The grizzly bear (Ursus arctos horribilis), also known as the North American brown bear or simply grizzly, is a population or subspecies of the brown bear inhabiting North America.

In addition to the mainland grizzly (Ursus arctos horribilis), other forms of brown bear are sometimes identified as grizzly bears. These include three living populations—the Kodiak bear (U. a. middendorffi), the Kamchatka bear (U. a. beringianus), and the peninsular grizzly (U. a. gyas)—as well as the extinct California grizzly (U. a. californicus†) and Mexican grizzly (formerly U. a. nelsoni†).

The Ussuri brown bear (U. a. lasiotus), inhabiting parts of northeast Asia, is sometimes referred to as the "black grizzly", although it is no more closely related to North American brown bears than other subspecies of the brown bear around the world.

== Classification ==
=== Meaning of "grizzly" ===
Meriwether Lewis and William Clark first described it as grisley, which could be interpreted as either "grizzly" (i.e., "grizzled"—that is, with grey-tipped hair) or "grisly" ("fear-inspiring", now usually "gruesome"). The modern spelling supposes the former meaning; even so, naturalist George Ord formally classified it in 1815 as U. horribilis for its character.

=== Evolution and genetics ===
==== Phylogenetics ====
Several studies have been conducted on the genetic history of the grizzly bear. Classification has been revised along genetic lines. There are two morphological forms of Ursus arctos: the grizzly and the coastal brown bears, but these morphological forms do not have distinct mtDNA lineages. The genome of the grizzly bear was sequenced in 2018 and found to be 2,328.64Mb (megabase pairs) in length and contain 30,387 genes.

==== Ursus arctos ====
Brown bears originated in Eurasia, and first migrated to North America between 177,000 BP ~ 111,000 BP. Most grizzly bears belong to this initial population of North American brown bear (clade 4), which continues to be the dominant mitochondrial grouping south of subarctic North America. Genetic divergences suggest brown bears first migrated south during MIS-5 (~92,000 - 83,000 BP) upon the opening of the ice-free corridor, with the first fossils being near Edmonton (26,000 BP). Other mitochondrial lineages appear later- the Alexander and Haida Gwaii archipelagoes have an endemic lineage, which first appears around 20,000 BP. After a local extinction in Beringia ~33,000 BP, two closely related lineages repopulated Alaska and northern Canada from Eurasia after the Last Glacial Maximum (>25,000 BP).

In the 19th century, the grizzly was classified as 86 distinct species. By 1928, only seven grizzly species remained, and by 1953, only one species remained globally. However, modern genetic testing reveals the grizzly to be a subspecies of the brown bear (Ursus arctos). Biologist R.L. Rausch found that North America has but one species of grizzly. Therefore, everywhere it is the "brown bear"; in North America, it is the "grizzly", but these are all the same species, Ursus arctos.

==== Subspecies in North America ====
In 1963, Rausch reduced the number of North American subspecies to one, Ursus arctos middendorffi. Further testing of Y-chromosomes is required to yield an accurate new taxonomy with different subspecies. Coastal grizzlies, often referred to by the popular but geographically redundant synonym of "brown bear" or "Alaskan brown bear," are larger and darker than inland grizzlies, which is why they, too, were considered a different species from grizzlies. Kodiak grizzly bears were also at one time considered distinct. Therefore, at one time the thought was that there were five different "species" of brown bear, including three in North America.

It remains an open question how many subspecies of Ursus arctos are present in North America. Traditionally, the following have been recognized alongside U. a. horribilis proper: Alaskan brown bear (U. a. alascensis), California grizzly bear (U. a. californicus), Dall Island brown bear (U. a. dalli), the Alaska Peninsula brown bear (U. a. gyas), Kodiak bear (U. a. middendorffi), Mexican grizzly bear (U. a. nelsoni), ABC Islands bear (U. a. sitkensis), and Stickeen brown bear (U. a. stikeenensis).

One study based on mitochondrial DNA recovered no distinct genetic groupings of North American brown bears, implying that previous grizzly bear subspecies designations are unwarranted and these bears should all be considered populations of U. a. horribilis. The only genetically anomalous grouping was the ABC Islands bear, which bears genetic introgression from the polar bear. A formal taxonomic revision was not performed, however, and the implied synonymy has not been accepted by taxonomic authorities. Furthermore, a handful of studies have suggested that certain Alaskan brown bears, including the Kodiak and Alaskan Peninsula grizzly bears, are members of a Eurasian brown bear lineage, more closely related to Siberian brown bear populations than to other North American brown bears. Until the systematics of North American brown bears is studied in more depth, other North American subspecies have been provisionally considered separate from U. a. horribilis.

== Appearance ==
=== Size ===
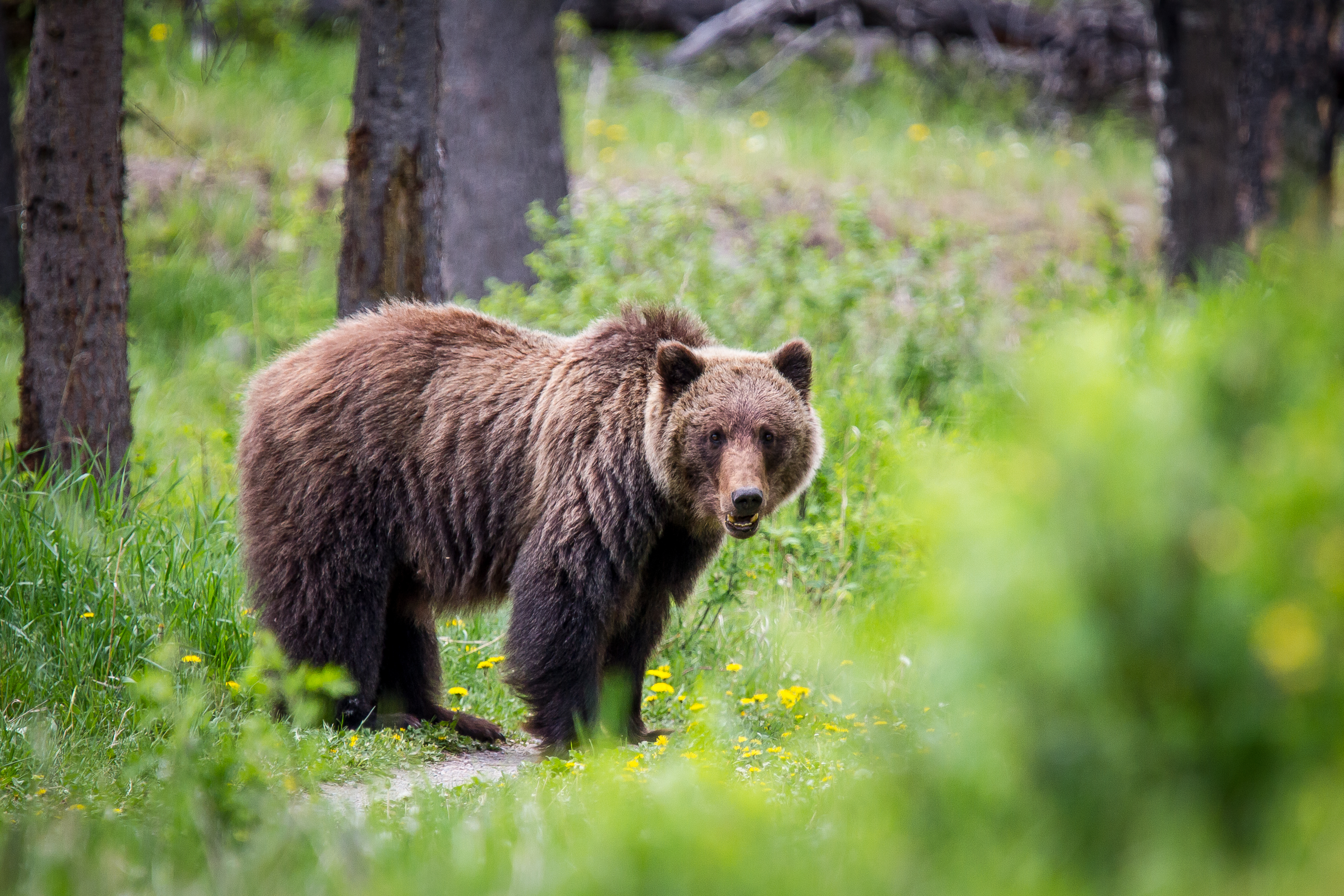
A grizzly roams in a wooded area near Jasper Townsite in Jasper National Park, Alberta, Canada

Grizzly bears are some of the largest subspecies of brown bear, only being beaten by the Kamchatka brown bears and the Kodiak bears. Grizzly bears vary in size depending on timing and populations.

The largest populations are the coastal grizzlies in the Alaskan peninsula, with males weighing 389 kilograms (858 lb) and females weighing 207 kilograms (456 lb).

The populations in northern interior Canada are much smaller, with males weighing 139 kilograms (306 lb) and females weighing 95 kilograms (209 lb). This is actually similar to the American black bear population of the area.

Average total length in this subspecies is between 198 cm (78 in) and 240 cm (94 in), with an average shoulder height of 102 cm (40 in) and hindfoot length of 28 cm (11 in). Newborn bears may weigh less than 500 g (18 oz).

=== Characteristics ===
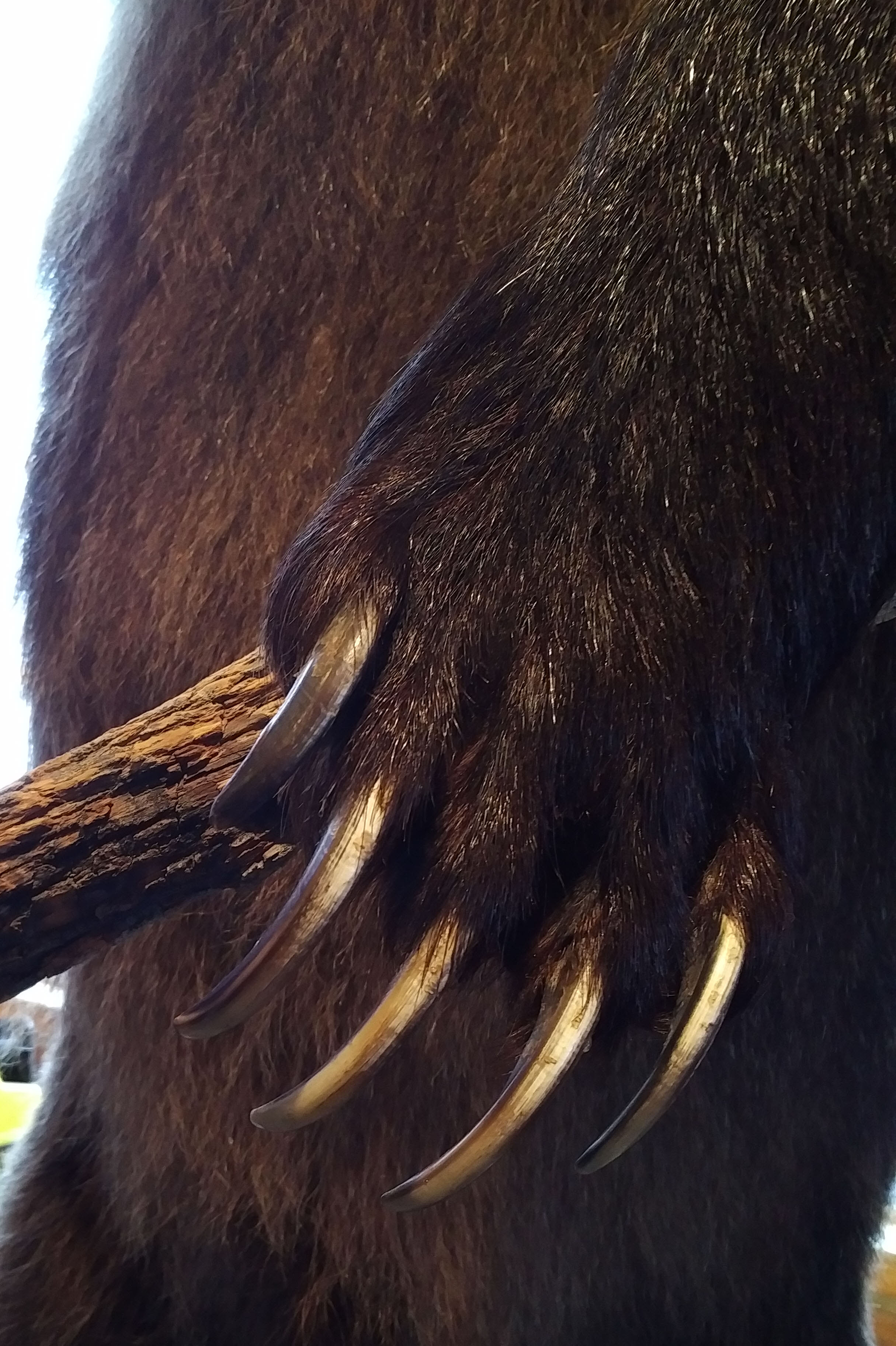
Grizzly claws are longer than an American black bear's and adapted for digging

Although variable in color from blond to nearly black, grizzly bear fur is typically brown with darker legs and commonly white or blond-tipped fur on the flank and back.

Grizzly bears overlap with Black Bears in range, but numerous factors can differentiate the two:

- A pronounced muscular hump appears on adult grizzlies' shoulders; black bears do not have this hump.
- Aside from the distinguishing hump, a grizzly bear can be identified by a "dished in" profile of their face with short, rounded ears, whereas a black bear has a straight face profile and longer ears.
- A grizzly bear can also be identified by its rump, which is lower than its shoulders; a black bear's rump is higher than its shoulders.
- A grizzly bear's front claws measure about 51–102 mm (2–4 in) in length; a black bear's claws measure about 25–51 mm (1–2 in) in length.

== Range ==
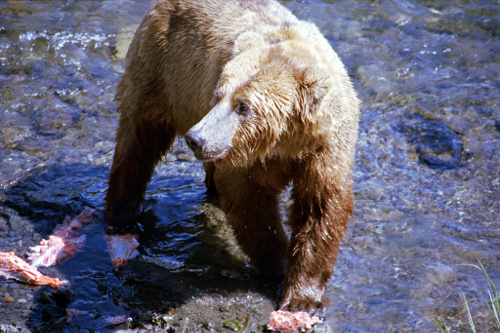
Alaskan grizzly in Katmai National Park with partially eaten salmon – the heads, skin and subcutaneous tissue are eaten to obtain the most fat

In North America, grizzly bears previously ranged from Alaska down to Mexico and as far east as the western shores of Hudson Bay; their range later contracted from Alaska, south through much of western Canada, and into portions of the northwestern United States (including Washington, Idaho, Montana, and Wyoming), extending as far south as Yellowstone and Grand Teton National Parks. In Canada, there were approximately 25,000 grizzly bears occupying British Columbia, Alberta, the Yukon, the Northwest Territories, Nunavut, and the northern part of Manitoba as of 2002.

An article published in 1954 suggested they may have been present in the tundra areas of the Ungava Peninsula and the northern tip of Labrador-Quebec. In British Columbia, grizzly bears inhabit approximately 90% of their original territory. There were approximately 25,000 grizzly bears in British Columbia when the European settlers arrived. However, population size has since significantly decreased due to hunting and habitat loss. In 2008, it was estimated there were 16,000 grizzly bears. A revised Grizzly bear count in 2012 for British Columbia was 15,075. Population estimates for British Columbia are based on hair-snagging, DNA-based inventories, mark-and-recapture, and a refined multiple regression model. In 2003, researchers from the University of Alberta spotted a grizzly on Melville Island in the high Arctic, which is the most northerly sighting ever documented.

=== Populations ===
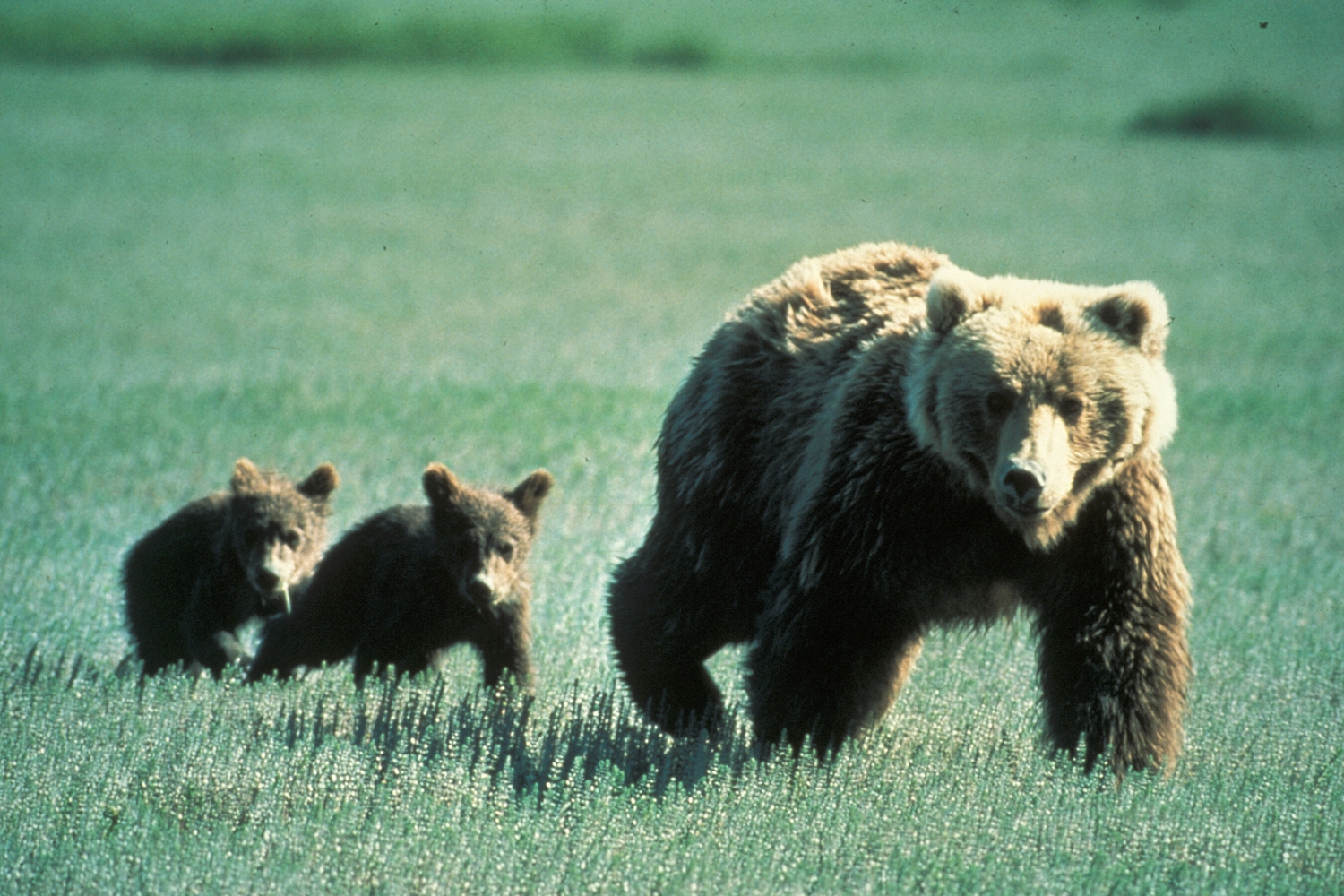
Family of grizzlies in Glacier National Park, Montana, United States

Around 60,000 wild grizzly bears were located throughout North America as of 2002, 30,000 of which were found in Alaska. and up to 29,000 live in Canada. The Alaskan population of 30,000 individuals was the highest population of any province/state in North America. Populations in Alaska are densest along the coast, where food supplies such as salmon are more abundant. The Admiralty Island National Monument protects the densest population: 1,600 bears on a 1,600 square-mile island. The majority of Canada's grizzlies live in British Columbia.

In the lower 48 United States, around 1,000 were found in the Northern Continental Divide in northwestern Montana. About 1,000 more lived in the Greater Yellowstone Ecosystem in the tri-state area of Wyoming, Idaho and Montana. There are an estimated 70–100 grizzly bears living in northern and eastern Idaho. In September 2007, a hunter produced evidence of one bear in the Selway-Bitterroot Wilderness ecosystem, by killing a male grizzly bear there.

In the North Cascades ecosystem of northern Washington, grizzly bear populations are estimated to be fewer than 20 bears, but there is a long-term management plan to reintroduce the bears to North Cascades National Park.

==== Extirpated populations and recovery ====
The grizzly bear's original range included much of the Great Plains and the southwestern states, but it has been extirpated in most of those areas. Combining Canada and the United States, grizzly bears inhabit approximately half the area of their historical range.

Although the once-abundant California grizzly bear appears on the state flag of California and was the symbol of the Bear Flag Republic before the state of California's admission to the Union in 1850, the subspecies is extinct. The last known grizzlies in California were killed in the Sierra foothills east of Fresno in the early 1920s.

The killing of the last grizzly bear in Arizona—in 1936 at Escudilla Mountain—was noted by naturalist Aldo Leopold in his A Sand County Almanac of 1949. There has been no confirmed sighting of a grizzly in Colorado since 1979.

Other provinces and the United States may use a combination of methods for population estimates. Therefore, it is difficult to say precisely what methods were used to produce total population estimates for Canada and North America, as they were likely developed from a variety of studies. The grizzly bear has legal protection in Mexico, European countries, some areas of Canada, and in all of the United States. However, it is expected that repopulating its former range will be a slow process, due to the bear's slow reproductive habits and the effects of reintroducing such a large animal to areas prized for agriculture and livestock.

== Biology ==
=== Hibernation ===
Grizzly bears hibernate for five to seven months each year (except where the climate is warm—the California grizzly did not hibernate). During this time, female grizzly bears give birth to their offspring, who then consume milk from their mother and gain strength for the remainder of the hibernation period. To prepare for hibernation, grizzlies must prepare a den and consume an immense amount of food because they do not eat during hibernation. Grizzly bears also do not defecate or urinate throughout the entire hibernation period. The male grizzly bear's hibernation ends in early to mid-March, while females emerge in April or early May.

In preparation for winter, bears can gain approximately 180 kg (400 lb) during a period of hyperphagia, before going into hibernation. The bear often waits for a substantial snowstorm before it enters its den: such behavior lessens the chances that predators will find the den. The dens are typically at elevations above 1,800 meters (5,900 ft) on north-facing slopes. There is some debate among professionals as to whether grizzly bears technically hibernate: much of this debate revolves around body temperature and the ability of the bears to move around during hibernation on occasion. Grizzly bears can "partially" recycle their body wastes during this period. Although inland or Rocky Mountain grizzlies spend nearly half of their life in dens, coastal grizzlies with better access to food sources spend less time in dens. In some areas where food is very plentiful year-round, grizzly bears skip hibernation altogether.

=== Reproduction ===
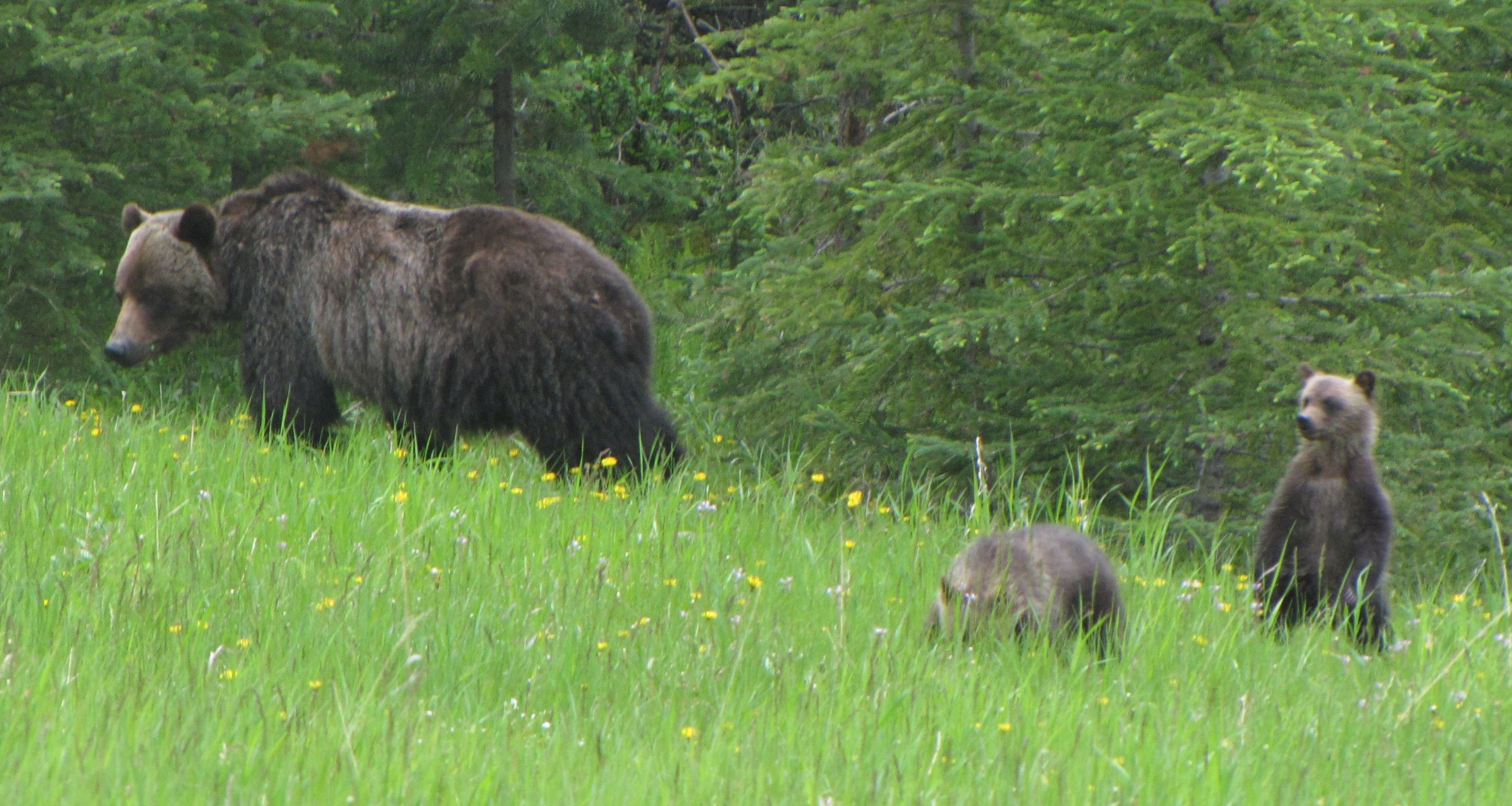
Sow with two cubs in Kananaskis Country

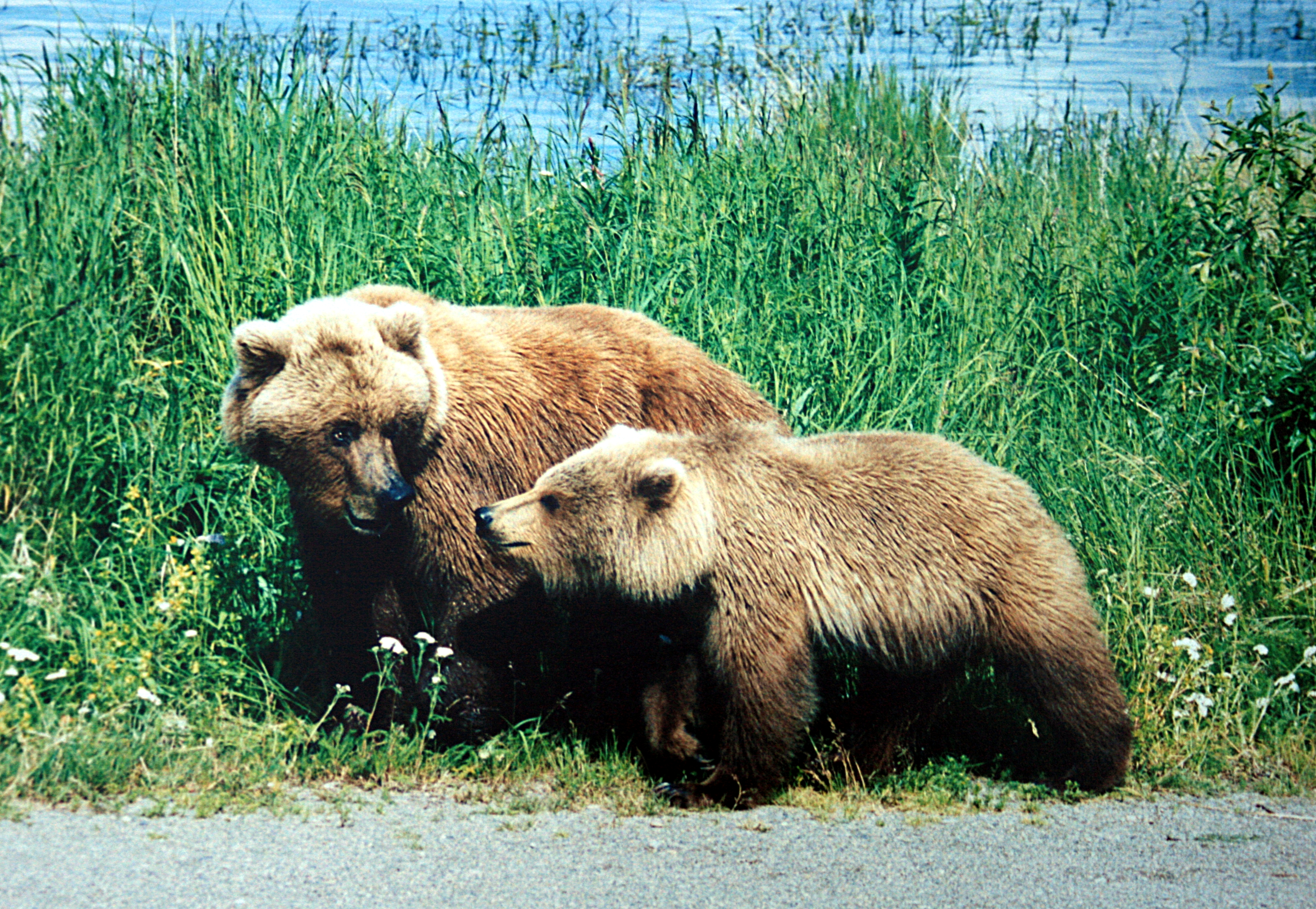
Mother grizzly with a cub

Except for females with cubs, grizzlies are normally solitary, active animals, but in coastal areas, grizzlies gather around streams, lakes, rivers, and ponds during the salmon spawn. Females (sows) produce one to four young (usually two) that are small and weigh only about 450 g (16 oz) at birth. A sow is protective of her offspring and will attack if she thinks she or her cubs are threatened.

Grizzly bears have one of the lowest reproductive rates of all terrestrial mammals in North America. This is due to numerous ecological factors. Grizzly bears do not reach sexual maturity until they are at least five years old. Once mated with a male in the summer, the female delays embryo implantation until hibernation, during which miscarriage can occur if the female does not receive the proper nutrients and caloric intake. On average, females produce two cubs in a litter and the mother cares for the cubs for up to two years, during which the mother will not mate.

Once the young leave or are killed, females may not produce another litter for three or more years, depending on environmental conditions. Male grizzly bears have large territories, up to 4,000 km^{2} (1,500 sq mi), making finding a female scent difficult in such low population densities. Population fragmentation of grizzlies may destabilize the population from inbreeding depression. The gestation period for grizzly bears is approximately 180–250 days.

Litter size varies between one and four cubs, typically comprising twins or triplets. Cubs are always born in the mother's winter den while she is in hibernation. Female grizzlies are fiercely protective of their cubs, being able to fend off predators including larger male bears. Cubs feed entirely on their mother's milk until summer comes, after which they still drink milk but begin to eat solid foods. Cubs gain weight rapidly during their time with the mother—their weight will have increased from 4.5 to 45 kg (9.9 to 99.2 lb) in the two years spent with the mother. Mothers may see their cubs in later years, but both avoid each other.

=== Lifespan ===
The average lifespan for a male is estimated at 22 years, with that of a female being slightly longer at 26. Females live longer than males due to their less dangerous life; they do not engage in seasonal breeding fights as males do. The oldest known wild inland grizzly was about 34 years old in Alaska; the oldest known coastal bear was 39, but most grizzlies die in their first year of life. Captive grizzlies have lived as long as 47 years.

=== Movement ===
They tend to chase fleeing animals, and although it has been said anecdotally that grizzly bears (Ursus arctos horribilis) can run at 56 km/h (35 mph), the maximum speed reliably recorded at Yellowstone is 48 km/h (30 mph). In addition, they can climb trees.

== Ecology ==
=== Diet ===
Wild grizzly bears at Brooks Falls, Alaska

Although grizzlies are of the order Carnivora and have the digestive system of carnivores, they are normally omnivores: their diets consist of both plants and animals. They have been known to prey on large mammals, when available, such as moose, elk, caribou, white-tailed deer, mule deer, bighorn sheep, bison, and even black bears, though they are more likely to take calves and injured individuals rather than healthy adults. Grizzly bears feed on fish such as salmon, trout, and bass, and those with access to a more protein-enriched diet in coastal areas potentially grow larger than inland individuals. Grizzly bears also readily scavenge food or carrion left behind by other animals. Grizzly bears will also eat birds and their eggs, and gather in large numbers at fishing sites to feed on spawning salmon. They frequently prey on baby deer left in the grass, and occasionally they raid the nests of raptors such as bald eagles.

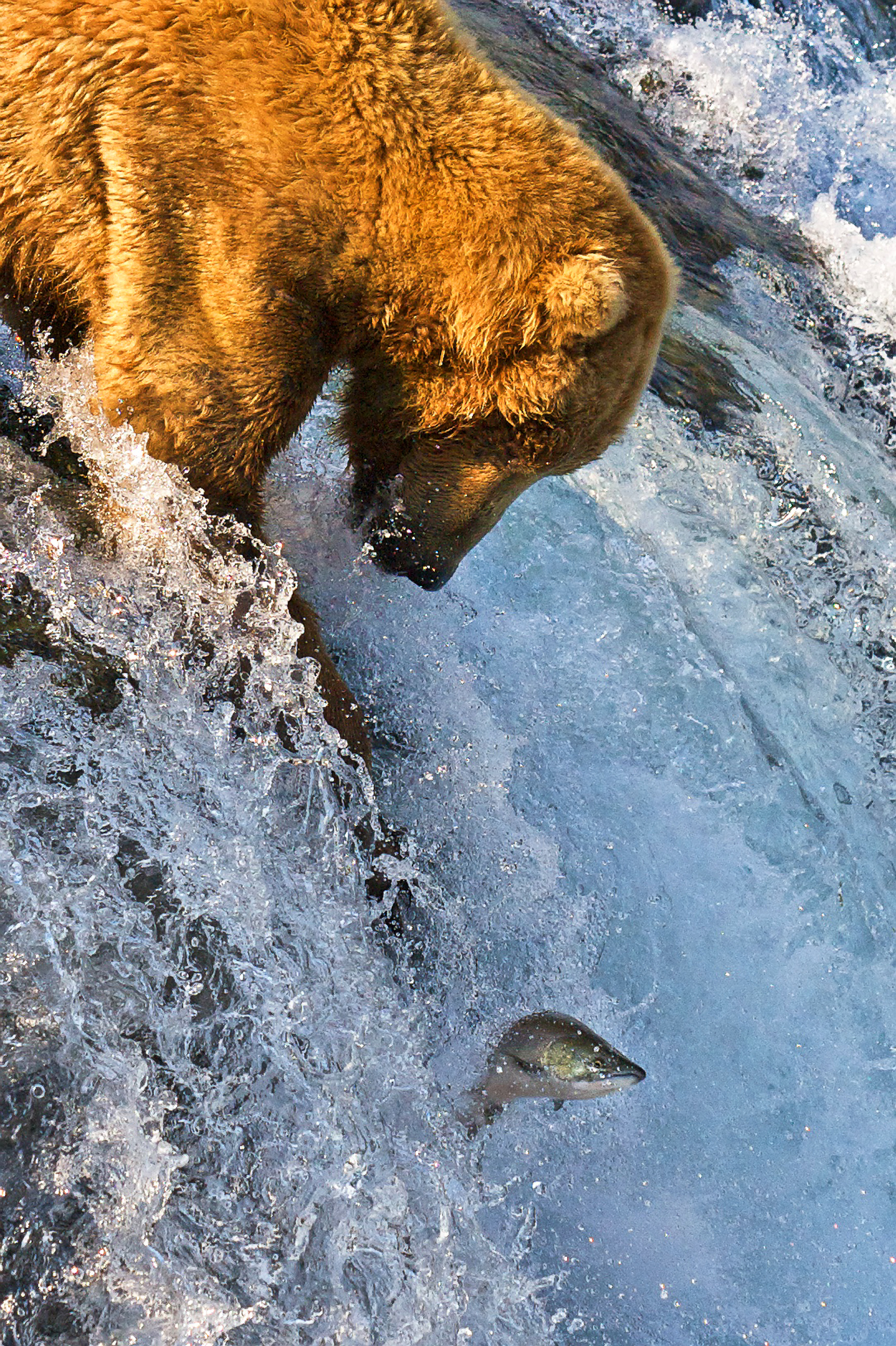
Grizzly fishing for salmon at Brooks Falls, Alaska

Coastal Canadian and Alaskan grizzlies are larger than those that reside in the Rocky Mountains. This is due, in part, to the richness of their diets. In Yellowstone National Park in the United States, the grizzly bear's diet consists mostly of whitebark pine nuts, tubers, grasses, various rodents, army cutworm moths, and scavenged carcasses. None of these, however, match the fat content of the salmon available in Alaska and British Columbia. With the high fat content of salmon, it is not uncommon to encounter grizzlies in Alaska weighing 540 kg (1,200 lb). Grizzlies in Alaska supplement their diet of salmon and clams with sedge grass and berries. In areas where salmon are forced to leap waterfalls, grizzlies gather at the base of the falls to feed on and catch the fish. Salmon are at a disadvantage when they leap waterfalls because they cluster together at their bases and are therefore easier targets for the grizzlies. Grizzly bears are well-documented catching leaping salmon in their mouths at Brooks Falls in Katmai National Park and Preserve in Alaska. They are also very experienced in chasing the fish around and pinning them with their claws. At sites such as Brooks Falls and McNeil Falls in Alaska, big male grizzlies fight regularly for the best fishing spots. Grizzly bears along the coast also forage for razor clams, and frequently dig into the sand to seek them. During the spring and fall, directly before and after the salmon runs, berries and grass make up the mainstay of the diets of coastal grizzlies.

Inland grizzlies may eat fish too; most notably in Yellowstone, grizzlies eat Yellowstone cutthroat trout. The relationship with cutthroat trout and grizzlies is unique because it is the only example where Rocky Mountain grizzlies feed on spawning salmonid fish. However, grizzly bears themselves and invasive lake trout threaten the survival of the trout population, and there is a slight chance that the trout will be eliminated.

Grizzly bears occasionally prey on small mammals, such as marmots, ground squirrels, lemmings, and voles. The most famous example of such predation is in Denali National Park and Preserve, where grizzlies chase, pounce on, and dig up Arctic ground squirrels to eat. In some areas, grizzly bears prey on hoary marmots, overturning rocks to reach them, and in some cases preying on them when they are in hibernation. Larger prey includes bison and moose, which are sometimes taken by bears in Yellowstone National Park. Because bison and moose are dangerous prey, grizzlies usually use cover to stalk them and/or pick off weak individuals or calves. Grizzlies in Alaska also regularly prey on moose calves, which in Denali National Park may be their main source of meat. In fact, grizzly bears are such important predators of moose and elk calves in Alaska and Yellowstone that they may kill as many as 51 percent of elk or moose calves born that year. Grizzly bears have also been blamed in the decline of elk in Yellowstone National Park when the actual predators were thought to be gray wolves. In northern Alaska, grizzlies are a significant predator of caribou, mostly taking sick or old individuals or calves. Several studies show that grizzly bears may follow the caribou herds year-round in order to maintain their food supply. In northern Alaska, grizzly bears often encounter muskox. Despite the fact that muskox do not usually occur in grizzly habitat and that they are bigger and more powerful than caribou, predation on muskox by grizzlies has been recorded.

Grizzlies along the Alaskan coast also scavenge on dead or washed-up whales.

Although the diets of grizzly bears vary extensively based on seasonal and regional changes, plants make up a large portion of them, with some estimates as high as 80–90%. Various berries constitute an important food source when they are available. These can include blueberries, blackberries (Rubus fruticosus), salmon berries (Rubus spectabilis), cranberries (Vaccinium oxycoccos), buffalo berries (Shepherdia argentea), soapberries (Shepherdia canadensis), and huckleberries (Vaccinium parvifolium), depending on the environment. Insects such as ladybugs, ants, and bees are eaten if they are available in large quantities. In Yellowstone National Park, grizzly bears may obtain half of their yearly caloric needs by feeding on miller moths that congregate on mountain slopes. When food is abundant, grizzly bears will feed in groups. For example, many grizzly bears will visit meadows right after an avalanche or glacier slide. This is due to an influx of legumes, such as Hedysarum, which the grizzlies consume in massive amounts. When food sources become scarcer, however, they separate once again.

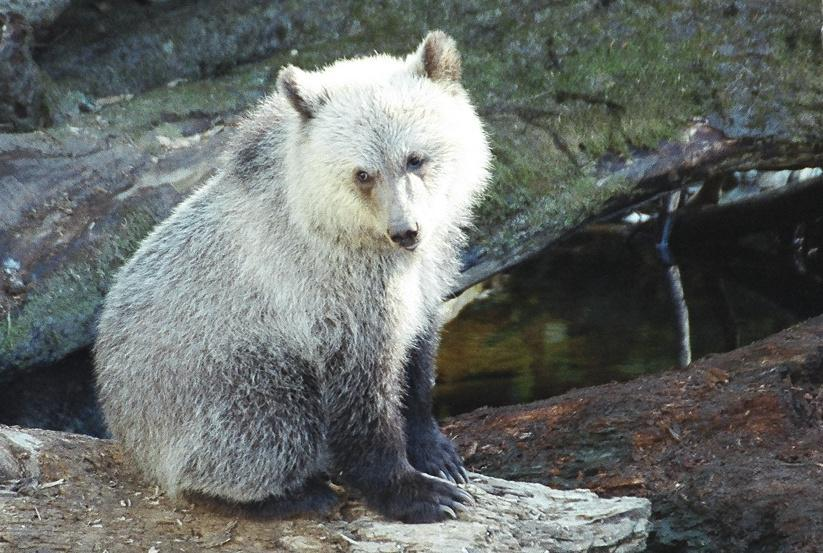
White-grey cub in Western Canada

=== Interspecific competition ===
The relationship between grizzly bears and other predators is mostly one-sided; grizzly bears will approach feeding predators to steal their kill. In general, the other species will leave the carcasses for the bear to avoid competition or predation. Any parts of the carcass left uneaten are scavenged by smaller animals.

==== Wolves ====
With the reintroduction of gray wolves to Yellowstone, many visitors have witnessed a once-common struggle between a keystone species, the grizzly bear, and its historic rival, the gray wolf. The interactions of grizzly bears with the wolves of Yellowstone have been under considerable study. Typically, the conflict will be in the defence of young or over a carcass, which is commonly an elk killed by wolves.

The grizzly bear uses its keen sense of smell to locate the kill. As the wolves and grizzly compete for the kill, one wolf may try to distract the bear while the others feed. The bear then may retaliate by chasing the wolves. If the wolves become aggressive with the bear, it is normally in the form of quick nips at its hind legs. Thus, the bear will sit down and use its ability to protect itself in a full circle. Rarely do interactions such as these end in death or serious injury to either animal. One carcass simply is not usually worth the risk to the wolves (if the bear has the upper hand due to strength and size) or to the bear (if the wolves are too numerous or persistent).

While wolves usually dominate grizzly bears during interactions at wolf dens, both grizzly and black bears have been reported killing wolves, and their cubs at wolf dens even when the wolves were acting in defence.

==== Big cats ====
Cougars generally give the bears a wide berth. Grizzlies have less competition with cougars than with other predators, such as coyotes, wolves, and other bears. When a grizzly descends on a cougar feeding on its kill, the cougar usually gives way to the bear. When a cougar does stand its ground, it will use its superior agility and its claws to harass the bear, yet stay out of its reach until one of them gives up. Grizzly bears occasionally kill cougars in disputes over kills. There have been several anecdotes, primarily from the late 19th and early 20th centuries, of cougars and grizzly bears killing each other in fights to the death.

The other big cat present in the United States which might pose a threat to bears is the jaguar; however, both species have been extirpated in the regions of the Southwest where their former habitats overlapped, and grizzlies remain so far absent from the regions along the U.S.-Mexico border, where jaguars appear to be returning.

==== Other bears ====
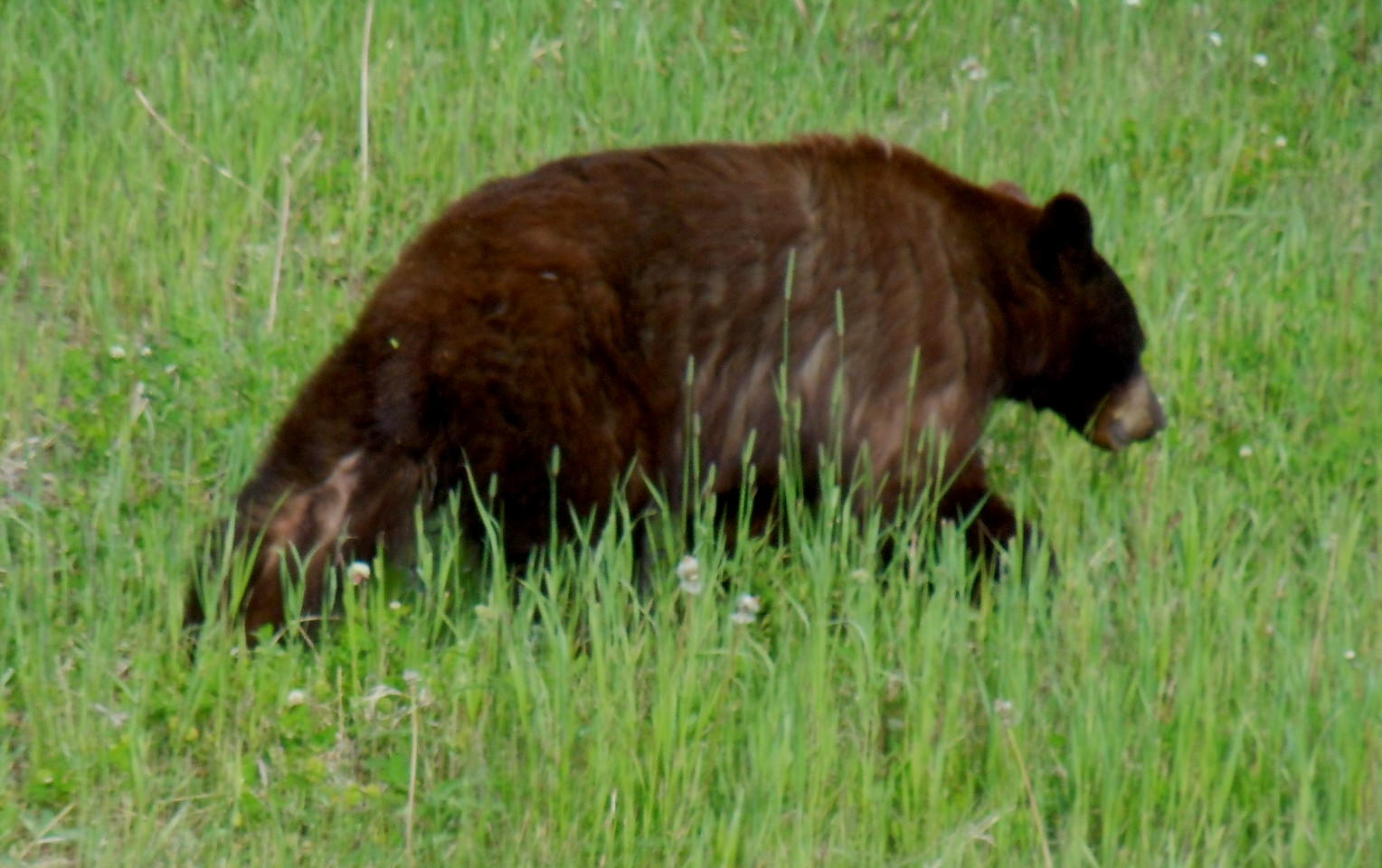
Possible grizzly-black bear hybrid in Yukon Territory, Canada

Black bears are not strong competition for prey because they have a more herbivorous diet. Confrontations are rare because of the differences in size, habitats, and diets of the bear species. When this happens, it is usually with the grizzly being the aggressor. The black bear will only fight when it is a smaller grizzly, such as a yearling, or when the black bear has no other choice but to defend itself. There is at least one confirmed observation of a grizzly bear digging out, killing, and eating a black bear when the latter was in hibernation.

The segregation of black bear and grizzly bear populations is possibly due to competitive exclusion. In certain areas, grizzly bears outcompete black bears for the same resources. For example, many Pacific coastal islands off British Columbia and Alaska support either the black bear or the grizzly, but rarely both.

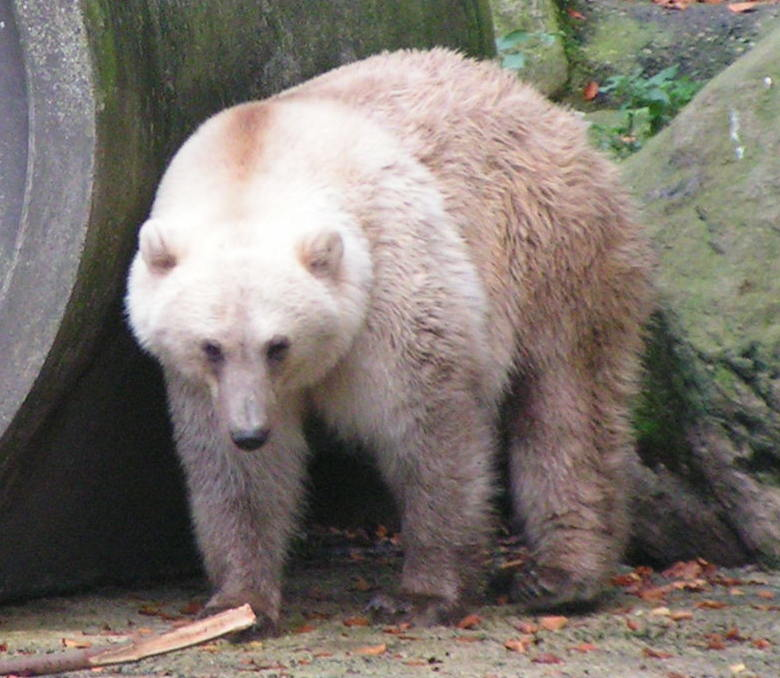
A grizzly and polar bear hybrid

In regions where they coexist, they are divided by landscape gradients such as the age of forest, elevation, and land openness. Grizzly bears tend to favor old forests with high productivity, higher elevations, and more open habitats compared with black bears. However, a bear shot in autumn 1986 in Michigan was thought by some to be a grizzly–black bear hybrid, due to its unusually large size and its proportionately larger braincase and skull, but DNA testing was unable to determine whether it was a large American black bear or a grizzly bear.

Encounters between grizzly bears and polar bears have increased in recent times due to global warming. In encounters the grizzly is usually the more aggressive one and often dominate in fight. However, healthy polar bears seem to be dominant over the grizzly.

However, conflict is not the only result of the two bears meeting; in some instances grizzly–polar bear hybrids (called grolar bears or pizzly bears depending on the sex of the parents) are produced.

==== Various small predators ====
Coyotes, foxes, and wolverines are generally regarded merely as pests to grizzlies rather than competition, though they may compete for smaller prey, such as ground squirrels and rabbits. All three will try to scavenge whatever they can from the bears. Wolverines are aggressive enough to occasionally persist until the bear finishes eating, leaving more scraps than normal for the smaller animal. Packs of coyotes have also displaced grizzly bears in disputes over kills. However, the removal of wolves and grizzlies in California may have greatly reduced the abundance of the endangered San Joaquin Kit Fox.

=== Ecological role ===
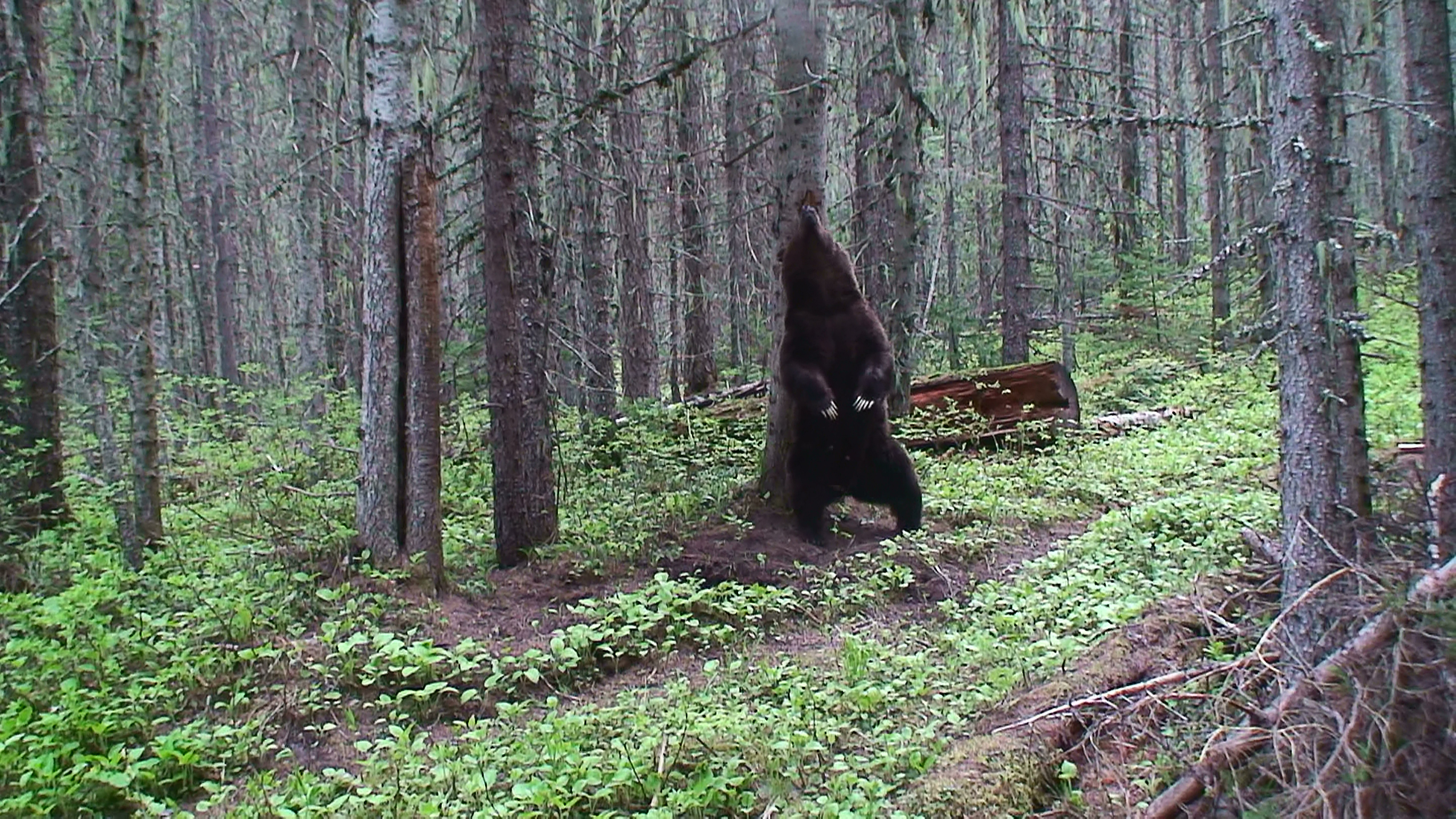
Scent rubbing

The grizzly bear has several relationships with its ecosystem. One such relationship is a mutualistic relationship with fleshy-fruit bearing plants. After the grizzly consumes the fruit, the seeds are excreted and thereby dispersed in a germinable condition. Some studies have shown germination success is indeed increased as a result of seeds being deposited along with nutrients in feces. This makes grizzly bears important seed distributors in their habitats.

While foraging for tree roots, plant bulbs, or ground squirrels, bears stir up the soil. This process not only helps grizzlies access their food, but also increases species richness in alpine ecosystems. An area that contains both bear digs and undisturbed land has greater plant diversity than an area that contains just undisturbed land. Along with increasing species richness, soil disturbance causes nitrogen to be dug up from lower soil layers, and makes nitrogen more readily available in the environment. An area that has been dug by the grizzly bear has significantly more nitrogen than an undisturbed area.

Nitrogen cycling is not only facilitated by grizzlies digging for food, it is also accomplished via their habit of carrying salmon carcasses into surrounding forests. It has been found that spruce tree (Picea glauca) foliage within 500 m (1,600 ft) of the stream where the salmon have been obtained contains nitrogen originating from salmon on which the bears preyed. These nitrogen influxes to the forest are directly related to the presence of grizzly bears and salmon.

Grizzlies directly regulate prey populations and also help prevent overgrazing in forests by controlling the populations of other species in the food chain. An experiment in Grand Teton National Park in Wyoming in the United States showed removal of wolves and grizzly bears caused populations of their herbivorous prey to increase. This, in turn, changed the structure and density of plants in the area, which decreased the population sizes of migratory birds. This provides evidence grizzly bears represent a keystone predator, having a major influence on the entire ecosystem they inhabit.

When grizzly bears fish for salmon along the coasts of Alaska and British Columbia, they often only eat the skin, brain and roe of the fish. In doing so, they provide a food source for gulls, ravens, and foxes, all of which eat salmon as well; this benefits both the bear and the smaller predators.

== Interaction with humans ==
=== Relationship with Native Americans ===
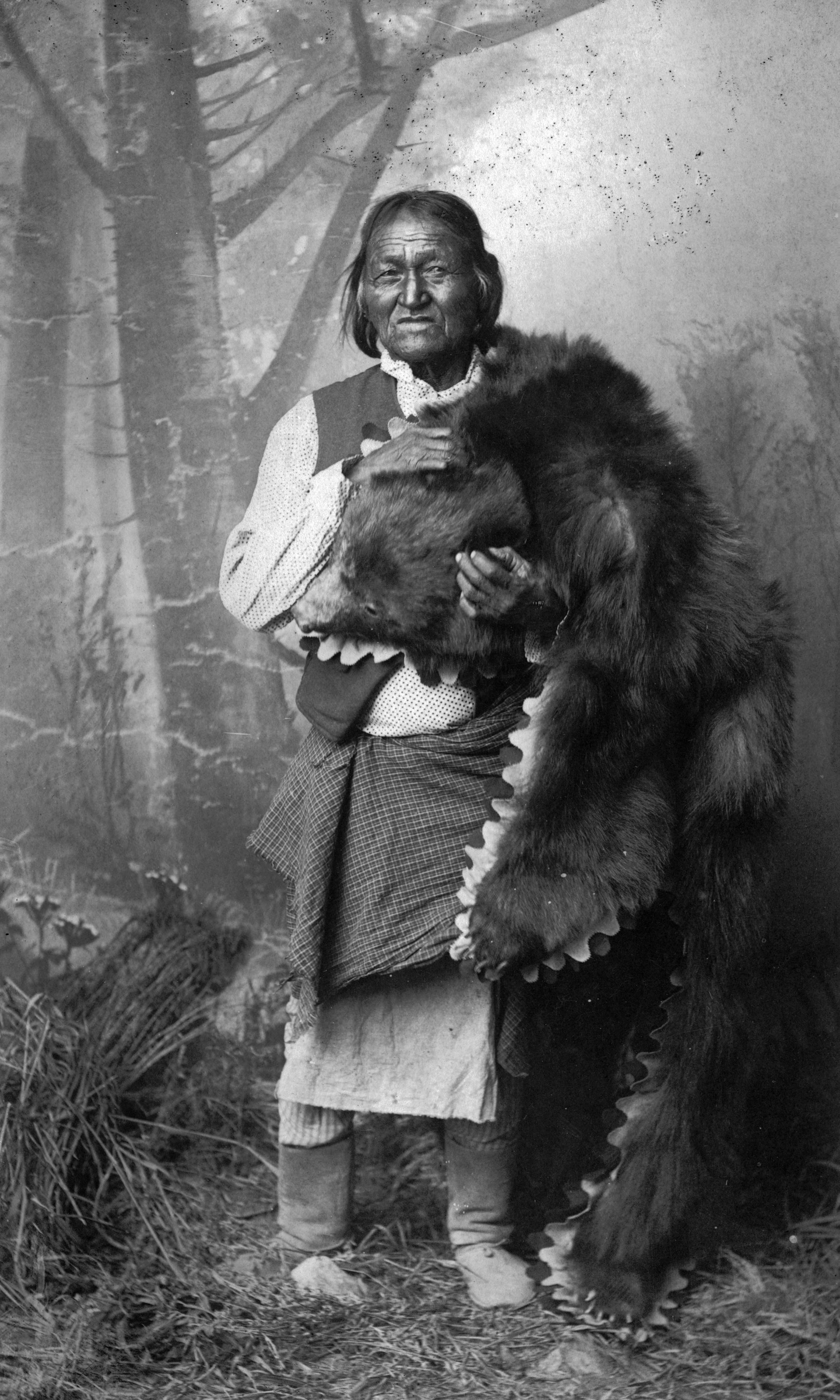
Gorgonia, a Native American (Mescalero Apache) man. He holds a bear pelt and wears moccasin boots, a breechcloth, kilt, and vest

Native American tribes living among brown bears often view them with a mixture of awe and fear. North American brown bears have at times been so feared by the Natives that they were rarely hunted by them, especially when alone. At traditional grizzly hunts in some western tribes such as the Gwichʼin, the expedition was conducted with the same preparation and ceremoniality as intertribal warfare and was never done except with a company of four to ten warriors. The tribe members who dealt the killing blow were highly esteemed among their compatriots. Californian Natives actively avoided prime bear habitat and would not allow their young men to hunt alone for fear of bear attacks. During the Spanish colonial period, some tribes would seek aid from European colonists to deal with problem bears instead of hunting grizzlies themselves. Many authors in the American West wrote of Natives or voyageurs with lacerated faces and missing noses or eyes, due to attacks from grizzlies.

Many Native American tribes both respect and fear the brown bear. In Kwakiutl mythology, American black and brown bears became enemies when Grizzly Bear Woman killed Black Bear Woman for being lazy. Black Bear Woman's children, in turn, killed Grizzly Bear Woman's own cubs. Sleeping Bear Dunes is named after an Ojibwe legend, where a female bear and her cubs swam across Lake Michigan. According to the legend, the two cubs drowned and became the Manitou islands. The mother bear eventually got to shore and slept, waiting patiently for her cubs to arrive. Over the years, the sand covered the mother bear up, creating a huge sand dune.

In the Yukon, a subculture of grizzlies postpone their hibernation to continue salmon runs into the late autumn and early winter. Once believed to be mythological by western anthropologists, these bears are noteworthy for rolling in sand then water, covering their hides with icicles. The Gwichʼin call these bears atsanh or luu tun, describing this covering of ice as both insulation from the cold and armor against hunters, and that the "ice bears" sometimes stay out all winter long.

=== Conflicts with humans ===
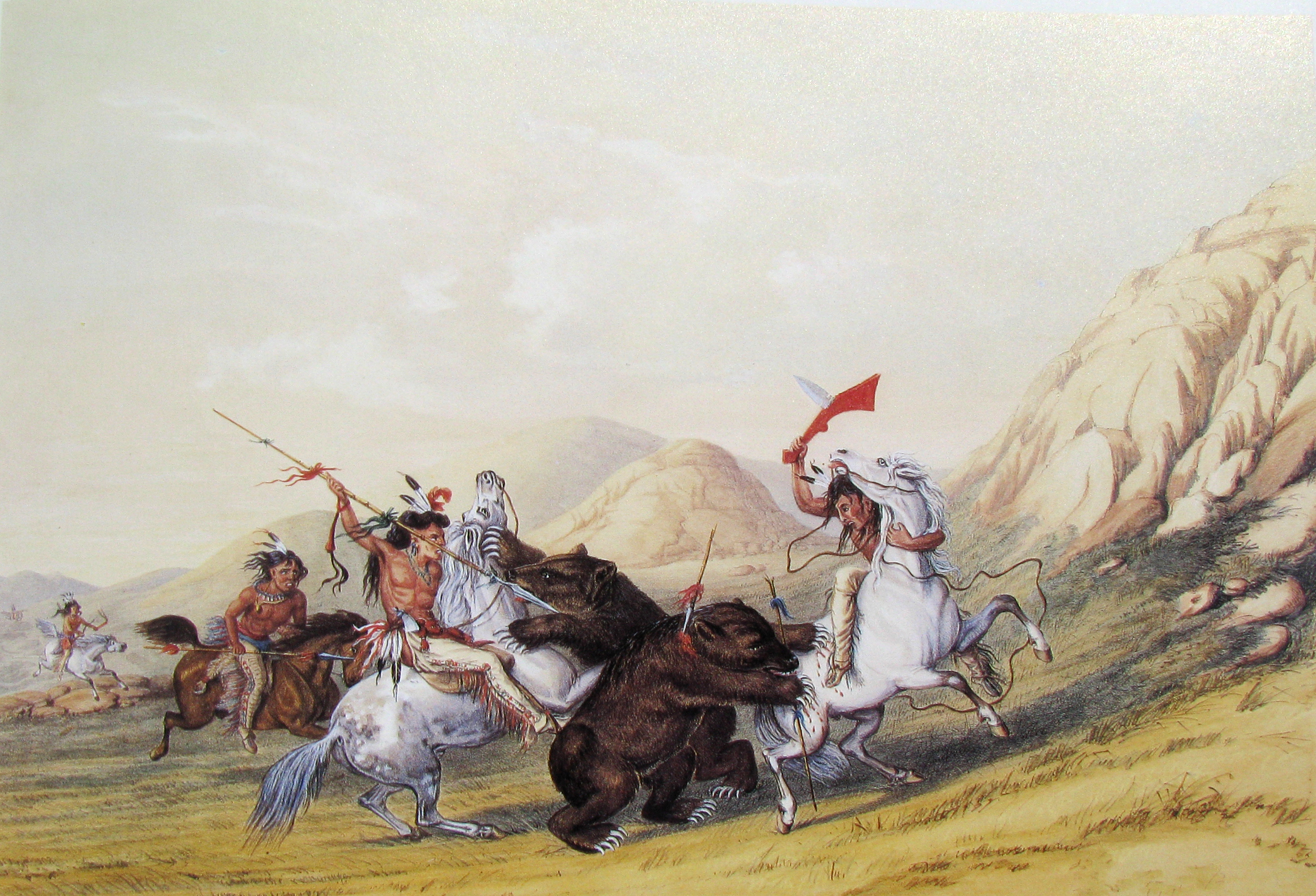
Native Americans fighting two grizzly bears, 1844 painting by George Catlin

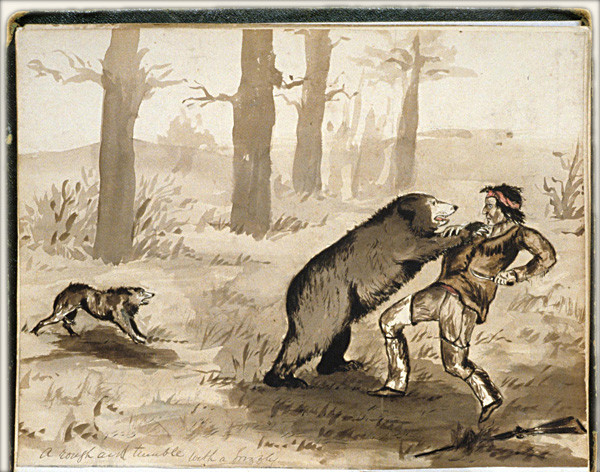
A rough and tumble with a grizzly by H. Bullock Webster, watercolor

Grizzlies are considered more aggressive than black bears when defending themselves and their offspring. Unlike the smaller black bears, adult grizzlies do not climb trees well, and respond to danger by standing their ground and warding off their attackers. Sows defending their cubs are the most prone to attacking, and are responsible for 70% of humans killed by grizzlies.

Grizzly bears normally avoid contact with people. Despite their obvious physical advantage, they rarely actively hunt humans. Most grizzly bear attacks result from the bear's having been surprised at very close range, especially if it has a supply of food to protect, or is a sow protecting its cubs.

Increased human–bear interaction has created so-called “problem bears”: the bears that have adapted to people's presence and activities. The intensive human use of grizzly habitat during the seasonal bear migration is exacerbating the issue. Aversive conditioning with rubber bullets, foul-tasting chemicals, or acoustic deterrent devices in an attempt to train the bears to associate humans with unpleasantness has little effect when the bears have already learned to positively associate humans with food. Such bears are translocated or killed because they pose a threat to humans. The British Columbia government kills approximately 50 "problem bears" and spends over one million dollars each year on addressing complaints about bears and relocating or eliminating them. A bear that has killed and fed on a human in a national park should be killed to prevent a repeated attack, as it perceives the human as a food source.

Bear awareness programs have been developed by communities in grizzly bear territory to minimize hostile encounters with both black and grizzly bears. The main goal of these programs is to teach people to manage foods that attract bears. Keeping garbage securely stored, harvesting fruit timely when ripe, securing livestock behind electric fences, and storing pet food indoors are among the measures promoted by these programs. Revelstoke, British Columbia, is an exemplary community that demonstrates the success of this approach. In the ten years preceding the development of a community education program in Revelstoke, 16 grizzlies were euthanized and 107 relocated away from the town. An education program run by the Revelstoke Bear Aware Society, a registered charity, was launched in 1996. In the first six years between its inception and 2002, only four grizzlies were eliminated and five relocated.

Among backcountry campers, hanging food between trees at a height judged as unreachable to bears is a common but unreliable practice. A better alternative to it is the use of a special bear-resistant food storage container.

Travelling in groups of six or more significantly reduces the chance of injuries from a bear's attack while hiking in bear country, although it doesn't entirely mitigate the risk. For instance, in November 2025, a grizzly bear attacked a school group of 20 near Bella Coola, British Columbia, seriously injuring four people, three of whom were children. The bite of a grizzly bear is remarkably strong and has been measured at over 8 megapascals (1,200 psi). Such pressure is large enough to crush a bowling ball.

=== Bear-watching ===
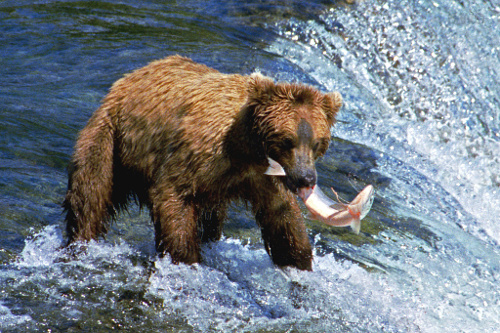
Bear catches a salmon at Brooks Falls

In the 21st century, especially in Alaska, ecotourism has boomed. While many people come to Alaska to bear-hunt, the majority come to watch the bears and observe their habits. Some of the best bear viewing in the world occurs on coastal areas of the Alaska Peninsula, including in Lake Clark National Park and Preserve, Katmai National Park and Preserve, and the McNeil River State Game Sanctuary and Refuge. Here bears gather in large numbers to feast on concentrated food sources, including sedges in the salt marshes, clams in the nearby tidal flats, salmon in the estuary streams, and berries on the neighboring hillsides.

Katmai National Park and Preserve is one of the best spots to view brown bears. As of 2012, the bear population in Katmai is estimated to be 2,100. The park is located on the Alaskan Peninsula about 480 km (300 mi) southwest of the city of Anchorage. At Brooks Camp, a famous site exists where grizzlies can be seen catching salmon from atop a platform–it can be even viewed online from a cam. In coastal areas of the park, such as Hallo Bay, Geographic Harbor, Swikshak Lagoon, American Creek, Big River, Kamishak River, Savonoski River, Moraine Creek, Funnel Creek, Battle Creek, Nantuk Creek, Kukak Bay, and Kaflia Bay bears can be seen fishing alongside wolves, eagles, and river otters. Coastal areas host the highest population densities year round because there is a larger variety of food sources available, but Brooks Camp hosts the highest population (100 bears).

The McNeil River State Game Sanctuary and Refuge, on the McNeil River, is home to the greatest concentration of brown bears in the world. An estimated 144 individual bears have been identified at the falls in a single summer with as many as 74 at one time; 60 or more bears at the falls is a frequent sight, and it is not uncommon to see 100 bears at the falls throughout a single day. The McNeil River State Game Refuge, containing Chenik Lake and a smaller number of grizzly bears, has been closed to grizzly hunting since 1995. All of the Katmai-McNeil area is closed to hunting except for Katmai National Preserve, where regulated legal hunting takes place. In all, the Katmai-McNeil area has an estimated 2,500 grizzly bears.

Admiralty Island, in southeast Alaska, was known to early natives as Xootsnoowú, meaning "fortress of bears," and is home to the densest grizzly population in North America. An estimated 1600 grizzlies live on the island, which itself is only 140 km (90 mi) long. One place to view grizzly bears in the island is probably Pack Creek, in the Stan Price State Wildlife Sanctuary. 20 to 30 grizzlies can be observed at the creek at one time and like Brooks Camp, visitors can watch bears from an above platform. Kodiak Island, hence its name, is another place to view bears. An estimated 3,500 Kodiak grizzly bears inhabit the island, 2,300 of these in the Kodiak National Wildlife Refuge. The O'Malley River is considered the best place on Kodiak Island to view grizzly bears.

== Protection ==
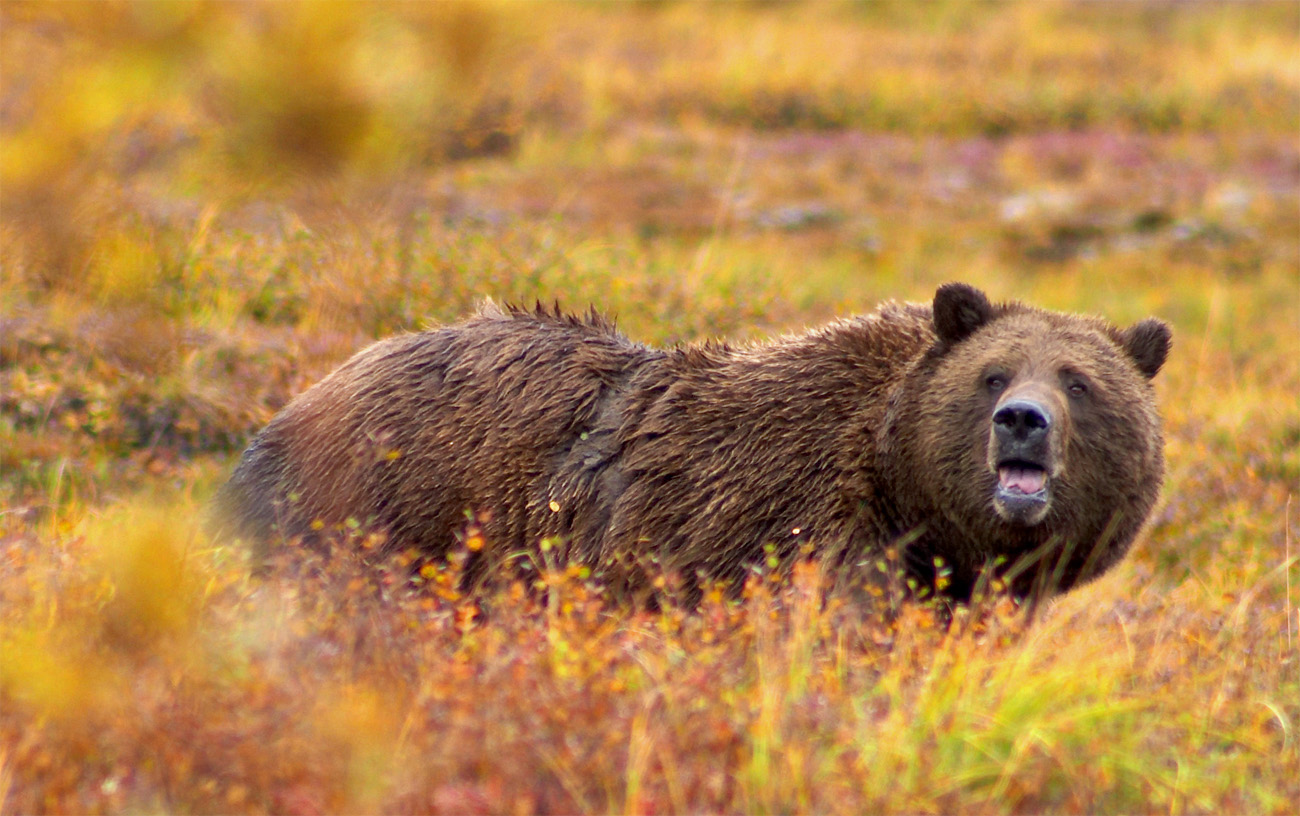
A grizzly in Denali National Park

The grizzly bear is listed as threatened in the contiguous United States and endangered in parts of Canada. In May 2002, the Canadian Species at Risk Act listed the Prairie population (Alberta, Saskatchewan and Manitoba range) of grizzly bears as extirpated in Canada. As of 2002, grizzly bears were listed as special concern under the COSEWIC registry and considered threatened under the U.S. Fish and Wildlife Service.

Within the United States, the U.S. Fish and Wildlife Service concentrates its effort to restore grizzly bears in six recovery areas. These are Northern Continental Divide (Montana), Yellowstone (Montana, Wyoming, and Idaho), Cabinet-Yaak (Montana and Idaho), Selway-Bitterroot (Montana and Idaho), Selkirk (Idaho and Washington), and North Cascades (Washington). The grizzly population in these areas is estimated at 1,000 in the Northern Continental Divide, 1,000 in Yellowstone, 40 in the Yaak portion of the Cabinet-Yaak, and 15 in the Cabinet portion (in northwestern Montana), 105 in Selkirk region of Idaho, 10–20 in the North Cascades, and none in Selway-Bitterroots, although there have been sightings. These are estimates because bears move in and out of these areas. In the recovery areas that adjoin Canada, bears also move back and forth across the international boundary.

The U.S. Fish and Wildlife Service claims the Cabinet-Yaak and Selkirk areas are linked through British Columbia, a claim that is disputed. U.S. and Canadian national parks, such as Banff National Park, Yellowstone and Grand Teton, and Theodore Roosevelt National Park are subject to laws and regulations designed to protect the bears.

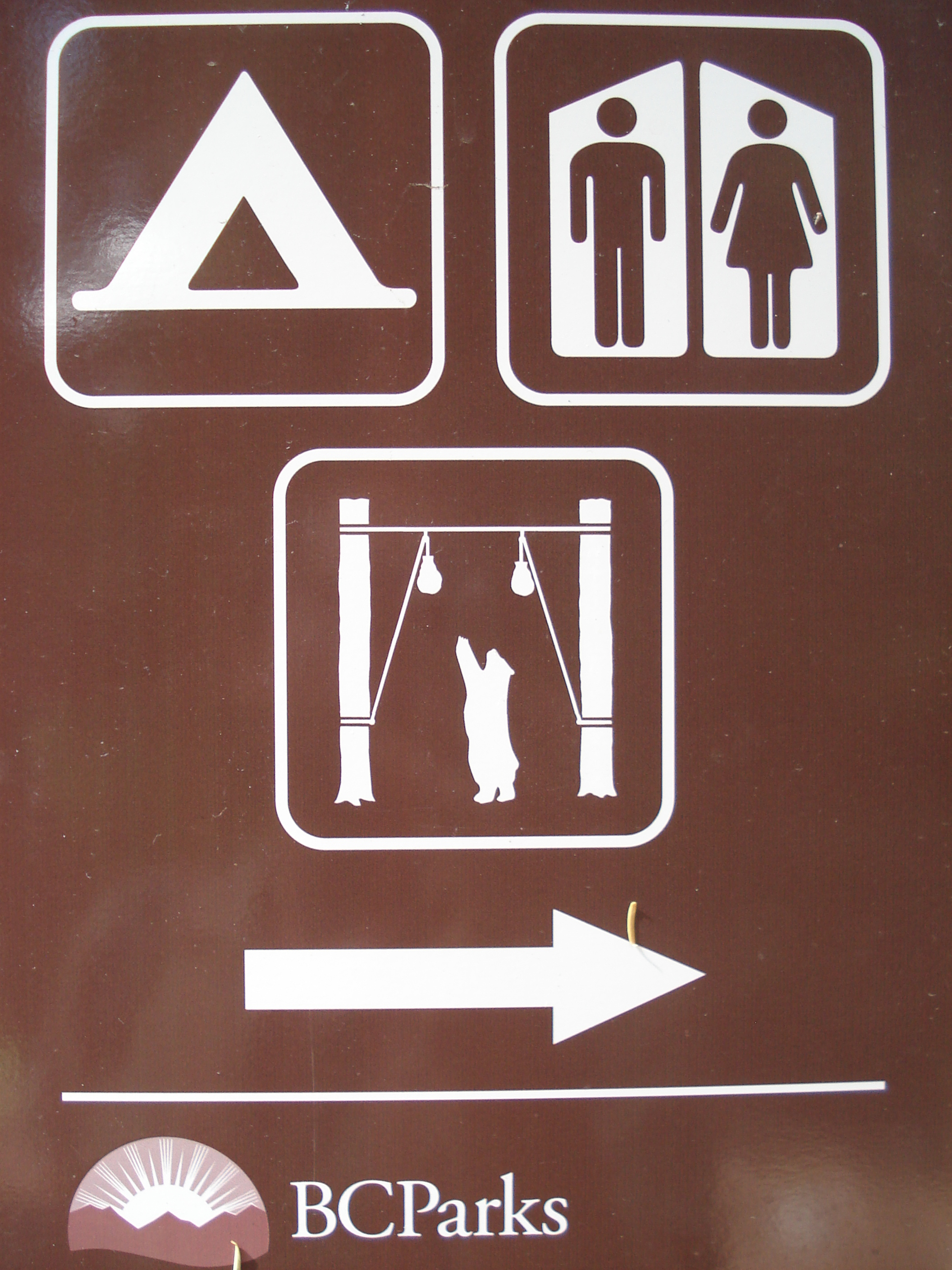
A sign at a BC Park warns campers to hang food, garbage, and toiletries out of reach of bears, or to use a secure bear cache

On 9 January 2006, the US Fish and Wildlife Service proposed removal of Yellowstone grizzlies from the list of threatened and protected species. In March 2007, the U.S. Fish and Wildlife Service "de-listed" the population, effectively removing Endangered Species Act protections for grizzlies in the Yellowstone National Park area. Several environmental organizations, including the NRDC, brought a lawsuit against the federal government to relist the grizzly bear. On 22 September 2009, U.S. District Judge Donald W. Molloy reinstated protection due to the decline of whitebark pine tree, whose nuts are an important source of food for the bears. In early March 2016, the U.S. Fish and Wildlife Service proposed to withdraw Endangered Species Act protection from grizzly bears in and around Yellowstone National Park. The population had risen from 136 bears in 1975 to an estimated 700 in 2017, and was delisted in June 2017. It was argued that the population had sufficiently recovered from the threat of extinction, however numerous conservation and tribal organizations argued that the grizzly population remained genetically vulnerable. They successfully sued the administration (Crow Tribe et al v. Zinke) and on 30 July 2019, the Yellowstone grizzly was officially returned to federal protection.

In Alberta, Canada, intense DNA hair-snagging studies in 2000 showed the grizzly population to be increasing faster than formerly believed, and Alberta Sustainable Resource Development calculated a population of 841 bears. In 2002, the Endangered Species Conservation Committee recommended that the Alberta grizzly bear population be designated as threatened due to recent estimates of grizzly bear mortality rates that indicated the population was in decline. A recovery plan released by the provincial government in March 2008 indicated the grizzly population was lower than previously believed. In 2010, the provincial government formally listed its population of about 700 grizzlies as "threatened".

As of 2006 Environment Canada considered the grizzly bear a "special concern" species, particularly sensitive to human activities and natural threats. In Alberta and British Columbia, the species was considered to be at risk. In 2008, it was estimated there were 16,014 grizzly bears in the British Columbia population, which was lower than previously estimated due to refinements in the population model.

=== Conservation efforts ===
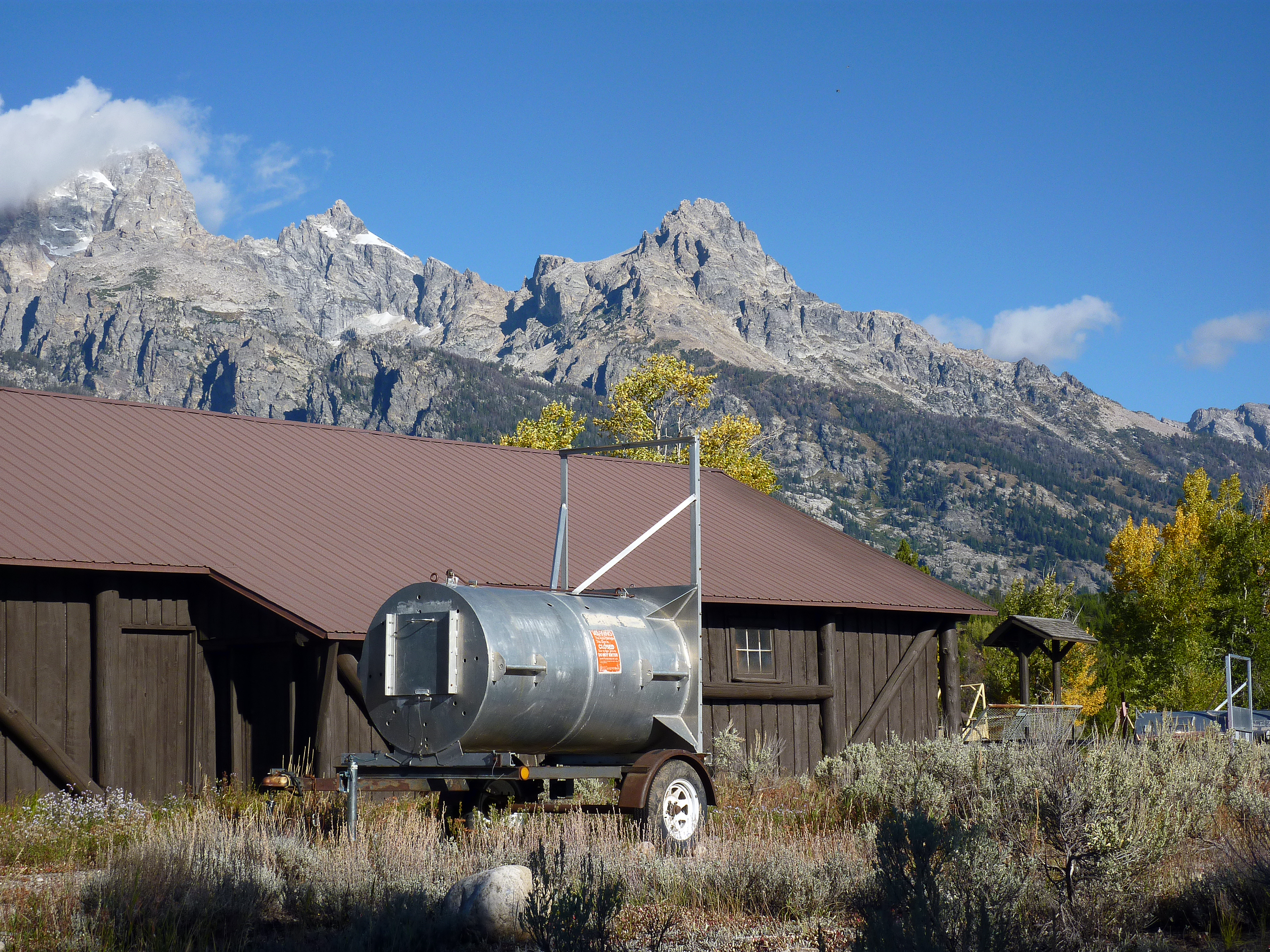
Drum or barrel trap, used to safely relocate bears, adjacent to a building in Grand Teton National Park in Wyoming, United States

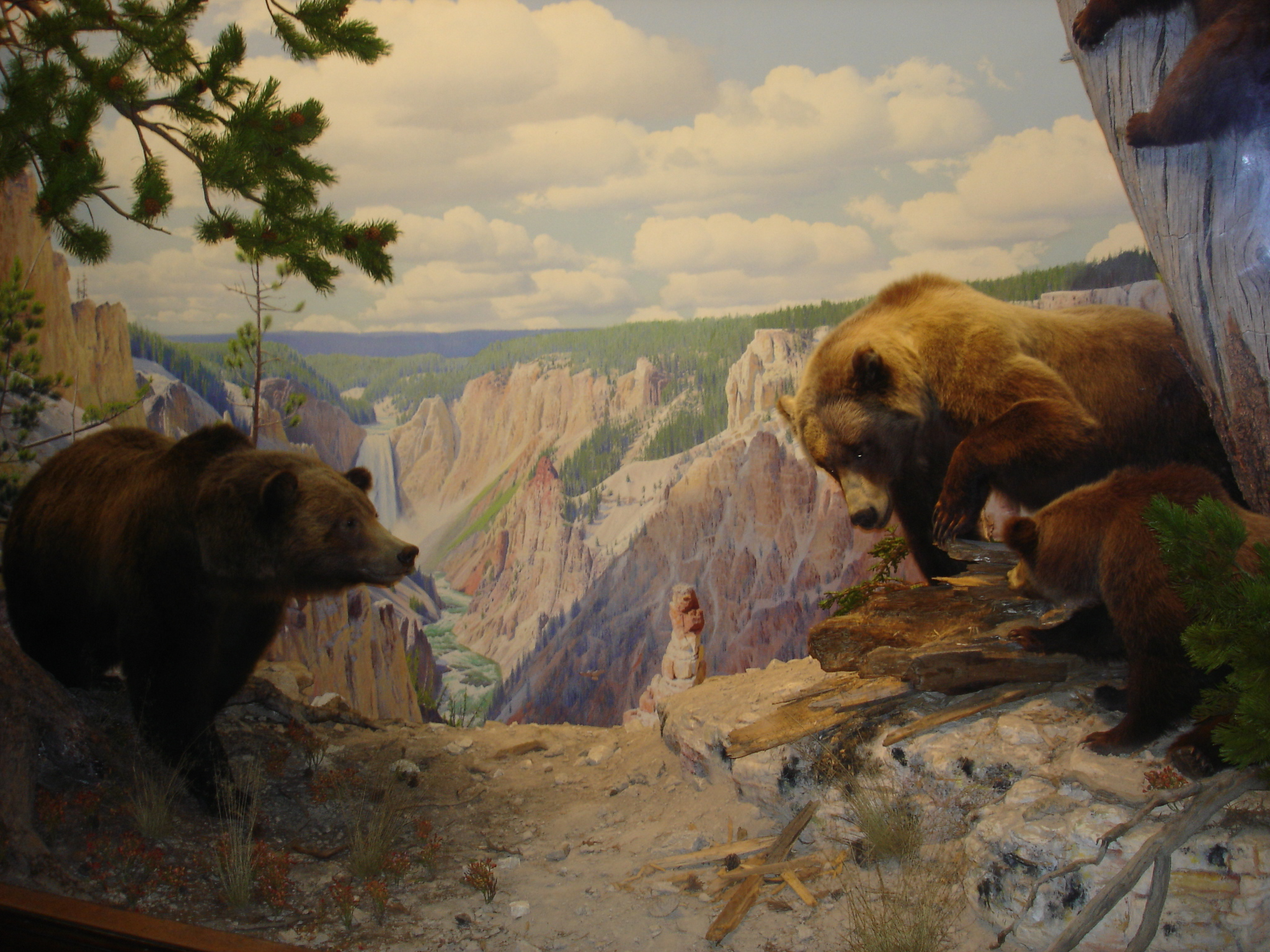
Taxidermied specimens at the American Museum of Natural History

Conservation efforts have become an increasingly vital investment over recent decades, as population numbers have dramatically declined. Establishment of parks and protected areas are the main task to help reestablish the low grizzly bear population in British Columbia. One example of these efforts is the Khutzeymateen Grizzly Bear Sanctuary located along the north coast of British Columbia; at 44,300 ha (109,000 acres) in size, it is a key habitat for this threatened species. Regulations such as limited public access, as well as a strict no hunting policy, have enabled this location to be a safe haven for local grizzlies in the area. When choosing the location of a park focused on grizzly bear conservation, factors such as habitat quality and connectivity to other habitat patches are considered.

The Refuge for Endangered Wildlife located on Grouse Mountain in Vancouver is an example of a different type of conservation effort for the diminishing grizzly bear population. The refuge is a five-acre terrain which has been home to two orphaned grizzly bears since 2001. The purpose of this refuge is to provide awareness and education to the public about grizzly bears, as well as providing an area for research and observation of this secluded species.

Another factor being taken into consideration when designing conservation plans for future generations are anthropogenic barriers in the form of urban development and roads. These elements act as obstacles, fragmenting the remaining grizzly bear population habitat and preventing gene flow between subpopulations (for example, Banff National Park). This, in turn, reduces genetic diversity and the overall fitness of the general population. In light of these issues, conservation plans often include migration corridors with long strips of "park forest" to connect less developed areas, or by way of tunnels and overpasses over busy roads. Using GPS collar tracking, scientists can study whether or not these efforts actually make a positive contribution towards resolving the problem. Most corridors are infrequently used, so genetic isolation is occurring, which can result in inbreeding and increased frequency of deleterious genes through genetic drift. Existing data suggest female grizzly bears are disproportionately less likely than males to use these corridors, which can prevent mate access and reduce the number of offspring.

In the United States, national plans have been made since 1982 for the recovery of grizzly bears. The Interagency Grizzly Bear Recovery Committee is one of many organizations committed to the recovery of grizzly bears in the lower 48 states. There are five recovery zones for grizzly bears in the lower 48 states including the North Cascades ecosystem in Washington state. The National Park Service and U.S. Fish and Wildlife initiated an environmental impact statement in the fall of 2014 to begin the recovery process of grizzly bears to the North Cascades region. The final plan and environmental impact statement was released in the spring of 2017 with a decision to follow.

In 2017, the Trump administration stripped parklands of regulations that protected wildlife, putting species such as the grizzly bear at risk. Federal protections on the grizzly bear in Yellowstone National Parks were removed. Regulations that protected the bears against hunting methods with Park Service rules (specifically in park lands in Alaska) were revisited by the Department of Interior. The National Parks Conservation Association (NPCA) supports common sense opportunities for hunting in national preserves," but the state of Alaska's wildlife management leads in the killing of bears, which increases the population of moose and caribou. The rise in moose and caribou works in favor of sport hunters. Theresa Pierno, President and CEO of National Parks Conservation Association stated, "The State of Alaska's lawsuit against the Park Service and Fish and Wildlife Service seeks to overturn common sense regulations, which underwent a thorough and transparent public process. More than 70,000 Americans said 'no' to baiting bears with grease-soaked donuts in Denali National Park and Preserve. The public also wanted to stop sport hunters from crawling into bears' dens and using flashlights to wake and kill mother bears and their cubs. The state's attempt to dismantle this public process jeopardizes the stewardship of federal public lands, which belong to all Americans."

A press release on 3 October 2022, stated that a federal district court based in Alaska would be returning to look over a National Park Service rule relating to hunting practices, including baiting bears. The Interior Department and Park Service's decision permits the law to remain in place while conducting revisions.

== See also ==
- Bear-baiting
- Etsowish-simmegee-itshin (Grizzly Bear Standing), Kalispel chief
- Grizzly 399
- Grizzly Peak (Berkeley Hills)
- Grizzly–polar bear hybrid
- Timothy Treadwell, a.k.a. Grizzly Man
