= Miller moth =

Miller moth may refer to:

- Miller (moth), Acronicta leporina, a species of the Noctuidae family
- Army cutworm, Euxoa auxiliaris, a species of the Noctuidae family
- Several species of the Cossidae family
