= McNeil Falls =

Coordinates: 59°07′01″N 154°16′44″W

McNeil Falls is a waterfall on the McNeil River near Katmai National Park, Alaska. The river is famous for its large concentrations of brown bears and salmon. The salmon arrive mostly in July, having spent their lives in Kamishak Bay, and when they ascend the river to spawn it is an attraction to the largest concentration of brown bears anywhere on earth. Up to 144 brown bears have been identified at the river during a single summer with as many as 72 bears congregating in one place at a time. The river's entire 35 mile (55 km) length lies within the McNeil River State Game Sanctuary, created in 1967 by the State of Alaska to protect the numerous Alaska brown bears who frequented the area. It also lies entirely within the Kenai Peninsula Borough boundaries. The McNeil River State Game Sanctuary and Refuge is part of a 3.8-million-acre (1,500,000 ha) piece of land that is protected from hunting; the rest of this is Katmai National Park.

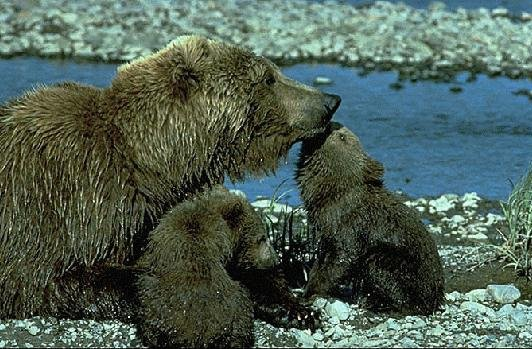
Mother brown bear with her cubs near the McNeil River.

More famous for its bear population than for the size of the river or the strength of its salmon runs, McNeil River has been featured on many television and film documentaries. So well-known has the area become as a bear-viewing area that in 1973 the State of Alaska began limiting the number of summer visitors to ten per day during peak visitor months of June, July, and August. The area has also been "wired" for webcam remote viewing for those unable to access the river in person.

Various groups have been formed to support keeping the area pristine and free from bear-hunting activity. And while the bear population often wanders outside the protected zone their numbers have gradually continued to rise over the years. In 2007, a group of conservationists managed to keep the state game refuge north of the sanctuary closed to bear hunting. Prior to the hunting debate, bears were legally hunted in the state game refuge north of the sanctuary. As a consequence, bear numbers at the falls dropped and the number of different individual bears decreased. Now, with better hunting and viewing regulations, bear numbers at the falls have risen again. The ADFG and the Friends of McNeil River have fought to keep the area closed to hunting and offer yearly ID books to help viewers identify each bear. July is by far the best month to view bears; up to 100 have visited the falls in one day in that month.

== See also ==
- List of waterfalls
