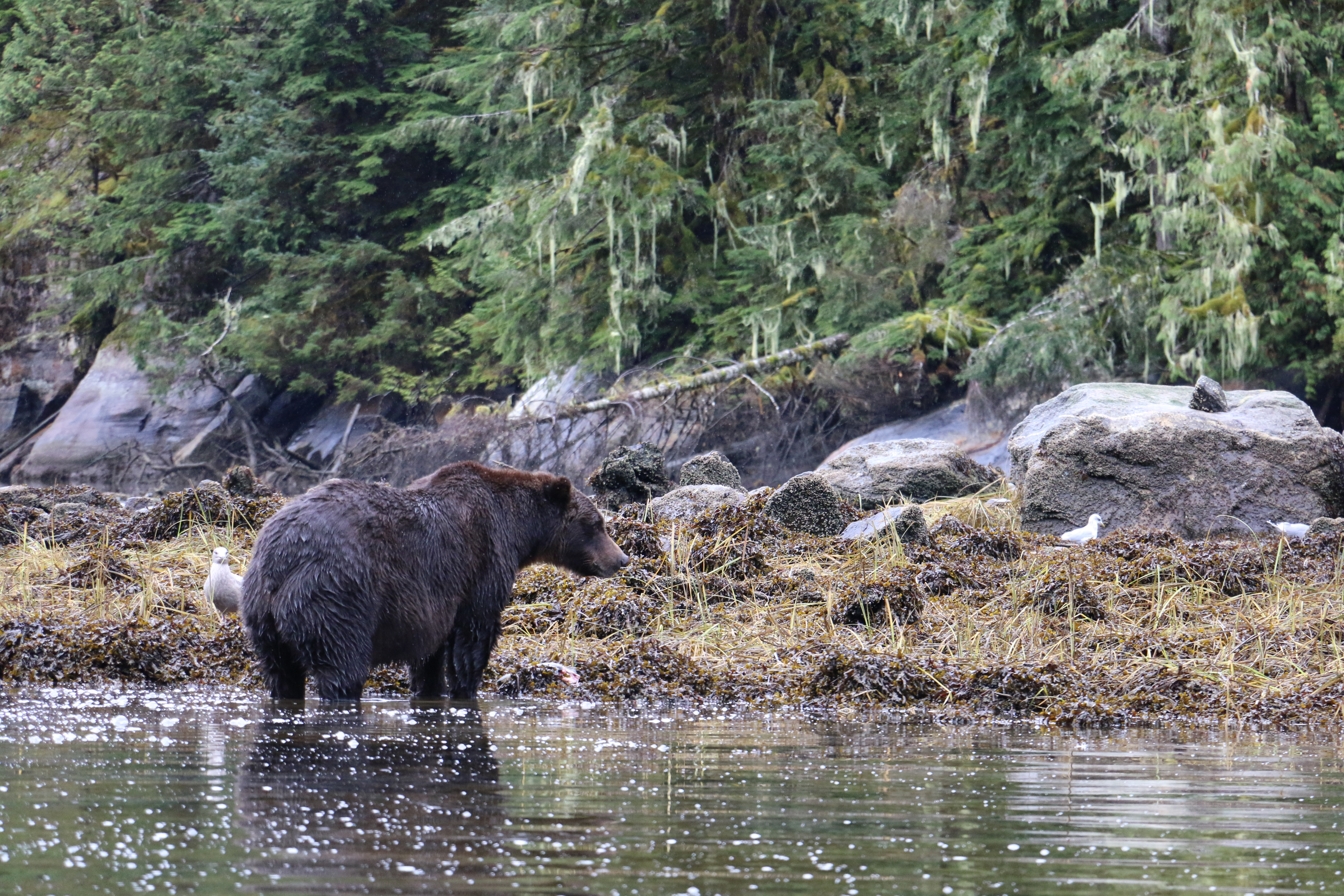

Conservation status
- Vulnerable (NatureServe)

- Special Concern (COSEWIC)

Scientific classification
- Kingdom: Animalia
- Phylum: Chordata
- Class: Mammalia
- Order: Carnivora
- Family: Ursidae
- Genus: Ursus
- Species: U. arctos
- Subspecies: U. a. stikeenensis

Trinomial name
- Ursus arctos stikeenensis Merriam, 1914

Synonyms
- Ursus tahltanicus Merriam, 1914; Ursus pervagor Merriam, 1914; Ursus chelan Merriam, 1916; Ursus hoots Merriam, 1916; Ursus kwakiutl Merriam, 1916; Ursus chelidonias Merriam, 1918; Ursus atnarko Merriam, 1918; Ursus crassodon Merriam, 1918

= Stickeen brown bear =

Subspecies of carnivore

The Stickeen brown bear (Ursus arctos stikeenensis), also known as Stikine brown bear, is a large North American brown bear that is most commonly dark brown, but can also range from blonde to black, featuring a distinctive hump on its shoulders and a slightly dished profile to the face. It formerly ranged along the coast of the Pacific Ocean from the southeastern Alaskan panhandle to the Siskiyou Mountains of Oregon, but is no longer found in Washington or Oregon.

== Description ==
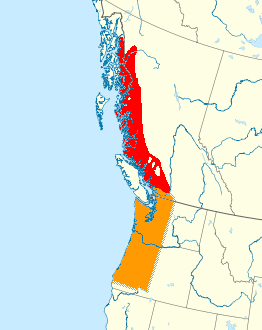
Range of Ursus arctos stikeenensis. Red: current. Orange: extinct.

With long front claws, an adult male typically weighs between 135 and 390 kg (298 and 860 lb), and an adult female between 95 and 205 kg (209 and 452 lb), and have shoulders between 90 and 110 cm (35 and 43 in). However, the size varies depending upon the amount of food. Skulls of the Stickeen brown bear are on average smaller than those of the ABC Islands bear or the extinct California grizzly bear.
