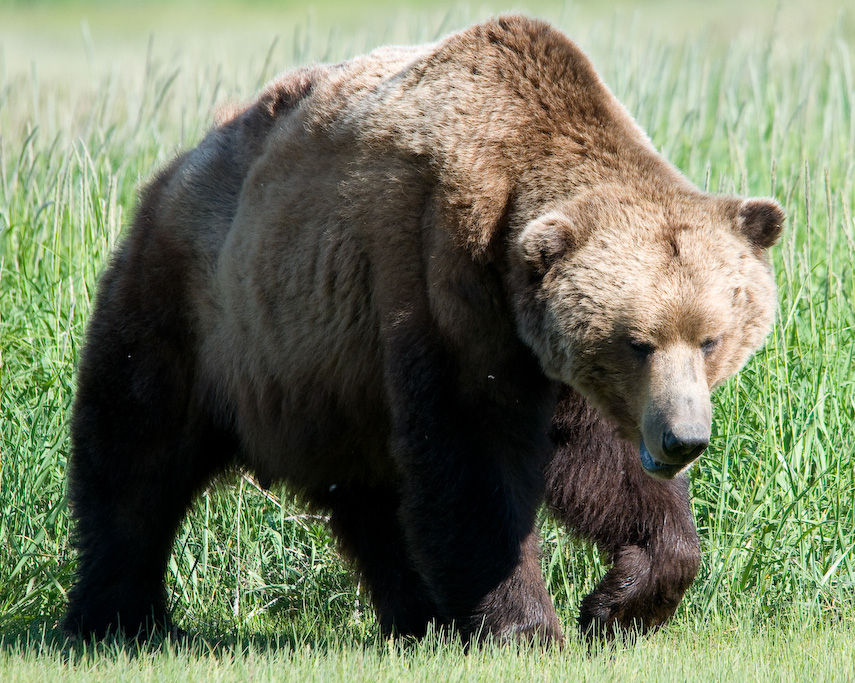
- Brown bear in Hallo Bay, Katmai National Park, Alaska, US

Conservation status
- Apparently Secure (NatureServe)

Scientific classification
- Kingdom: Animalia
- Phylum: Chordata
- Class: Mammalia
- Order: Carnivora
- Family: Ursidae
- Genus: Ursus
- Species: U. arctos
- Subspecies: U. a. gyas

Trinomial name
- Ursus arctos gyas Merriam, 1902

= Alaska Peninsula brown bear =

Alaska Peninsula brown bear Temporal range: Late Pleistocene – Recent

Possible subspecies of brown bear

The Alaska Peninsula brown bear (Ursus arctos gyas) or "peninsular grizzly" is a colloquial nomenclature for a proposed brown bear subspecies that lives in the coastal regions of southern Alaska, though there are debates as to whether it should be considered its own subspecies or rather just another population of the mainland grizzly bear subspecies (Ursus arctos horribilis).

Alaska Peninsula brown bears are very large, usually ranging in weight from 800 to 1,200 lb (360 to 540 kg). They are found in high densities along the southern Alaskan coast due not only to the large amount of clams and sedge grass but also to the annual salmon runs; this allows them to attain huge sizes, some of the biggest in the world. They may gather in large numbers at feeding sites, such as Brooks Falls and McNeil Falls, both in Katmai National Park near King Salmon. Various biologists maintain that coastal brown bears are their own subspecies. However, some other researchers consider correct to place all North American members of U. arctos in the subspecies horribilis except the giant Kodiak bears of Kodiak Island. To avoid confusion, many simply refer to all North American U. arctos subspecies, including Kodiaks, as "brown bears".

Prized by hunters for their skulls and hides, up to 500 of Alaska's 1,500 brown bears killed yearly by hunters come from the Alaska Peninsula. To hunt this large bear, hunters must follow a variety of regulations, including bear bag limits, hunting fees and proper rifles.

== Naming and etymology ==
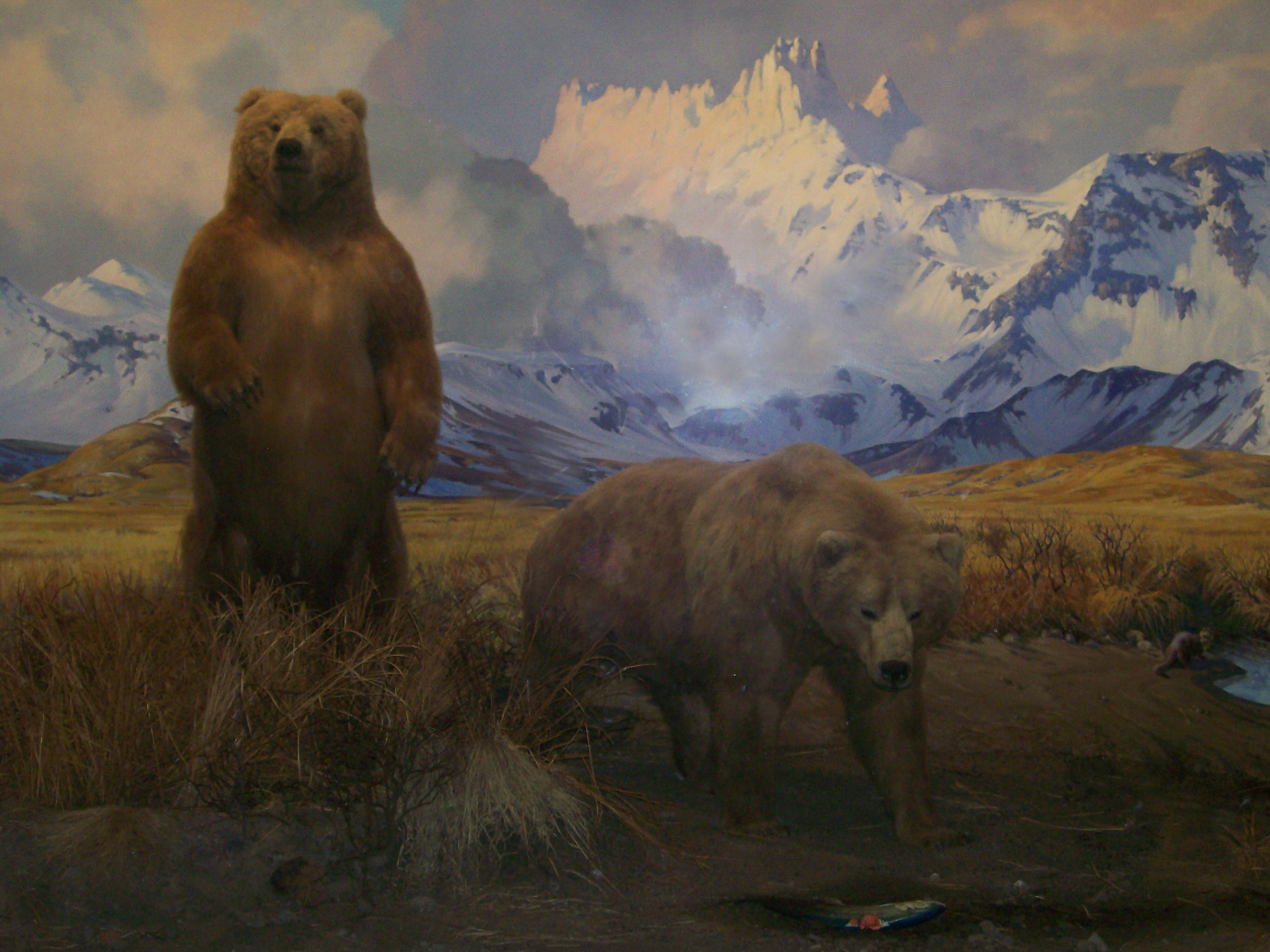
Taxidermied specimens, AMNH

The Alaska Peninsula brown bear's name most likely arose because, until 1975, it was considered a different species from the inland grizzly bear. It was never considered closer to European brown bears than inland grizzlies, but was given a different name, due to the size and color differences of coastal brown bears and inland grizzlies. From 1975 onward, it was considered to be the same species, but coastal ones retained the name "brown bear". When mentioning Brown bears or Grizzly bears, they are the same animal living in different areas. Coastal bears tend to be larger because of a diet high in salmon. The total number of brown bears in the U.S. is estimated at 32,000 with approximately 95% (30,400) living in Alaska. Around 4000 of these are coastal bears.

== Appearance ==
Alaska Peninsula brown bears are among the largest types of brown bear in the world. They usually measure 8 ft (2.4 m) in length, usually have a shoulder height of about 4 to 4 1/2 ft or 1.22 to 1.37 meters (137 cm), and a hindfoot length of 11 in (28 cm). One study found that the average weight for a coastal male was around 408 kg (899 lb), and 227 kilograms (500 pounds) for a female. One of the tallest Alaskan brown bears was measured at 2.74 m tall. An occasional huge male brown has been recorded which greatly exceeds ordinary size, with weights reported up to 680 kg (1,500 lb). A large coastal male of this size may stand up to 3 metres (9.8 ft) tall on its hind legs, and be up to 1.5 metres (4.9 ft) at the shoulder. The biggest individual on record was shot in 1948 near Cold Bay. Its weight was estimated at 725 to 771 kg (1,598 to 1,700 lb). This bear just came out of hibernation and carried little or no fat; that means the animal would have weighed around 839 kg (1,850 lb) at the end of the summer. Although variable from blonde to nearly black, grizzly bear fur is typically brown in color with white tips. A pronounced hump appears on their shoulders; the hump is a good way to distinguish a black bear from a grizzly bear, as black bears do not have this hump.

== Diet ==
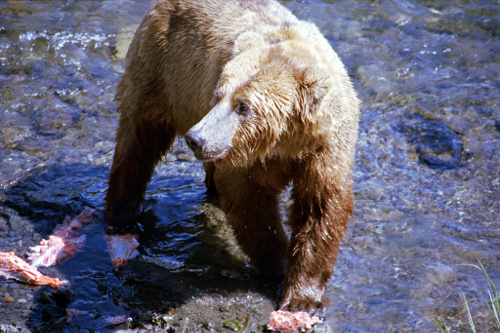
Bear in Katmai National Park with salmon. Salmon make up the majority of the brown bear's diet during summer.

Brown bears on the Alaskan Peninsula usually feed on spawning salmon, and use many different ways to catch them. These include waiting at the bottom of the falls for the fish to jump, or standing at the top of the falls waiting to catch the fish in midair (sometimes in their mouths). Bears also have much experience at chasing fish around and pinning the slippery animals with their claws. After the salmon runs, berries and grass make the mainstay of the bears' diets, after which they put on sufficient fat reserves and go into hibernation.
