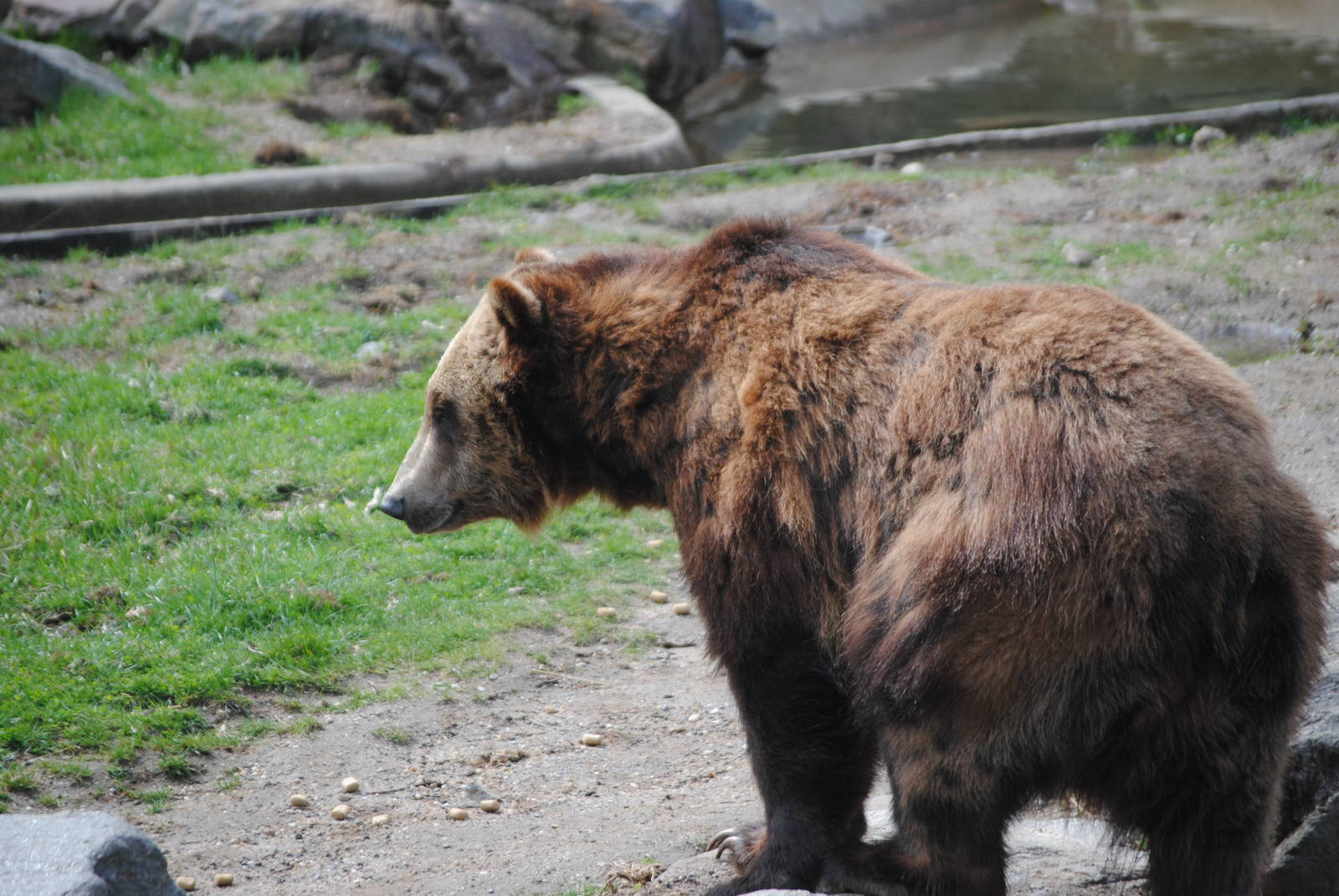
- At the Bronx Zoo

Conservation status
- Least Concern (IUCN 3.1) (ABC Islands)

Scientific classification
- Kingdom: Animalia
- Phylum: Chordata
- Class: Mammalia
- Order: Carnivora
- Family: Ursidae
- Genus: Ursus
- Species: U. arctos
- Subspecies: U. a. sitkensis

Trinomial name
- Ursus arctos sitkensis Merriam, 1896
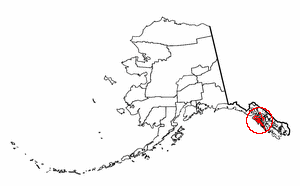

= ABC Islands bear =

Subspecies of brown bear found in Southeast Alaska

The ABC Islands bear or Sitka brown bear (Ursus arctos sitkensis) is a subspecies or population of brown bear that resides in Southeast Alaska and is found on Admiralty Island, Baranof Island, and Chichagof Island in Alaska (colloquially known as the ABC Islands), and a part of the Alexander Archipelago. It has a unique genetic structure that relates them not only to brown bears, but also to polar bears. Its habitat exists within the Tongass National Forest, which is part of the perhumid rainforest zone.

== Morphology ==
The ABC Islands bears have the appearance of the typical Alaska Peninsula brown bear, which includes milk chocolate-colored fur and a humped back, with a large size and reputation to match. Although the bear is commonly a milk-chocolate color, it can range from blonde to black. Along with the humped back, the bears also have a slightly dished profile to the face. The bears have long front claws. Adult males on average will weigh 195–390 kg (430–860 lb), with adult females weighing on average 95–205 kg (210–450 lb). Adult height will range on average from 90 to 110 cm (35 to 43 in) at the shoulder.

== Habitat ==
As these bears reside within the Tongass National Forest, the bears depend on species that are found within the ecosystem of the Tongass. Two of the common tree species in this ecosystem include the Sitka spruce and the western hemlock.

== Diet ==
The ABC Islands bears depend on a diet of various flora and fauna that is endemic to the region. For flora and funga this includes grasses; other plants like bulbs; berries like salmonberries and blueberries; and mushrooms. For fauna this includes animals like voles, mice, squirrels, and salmon.

== Behavior ==
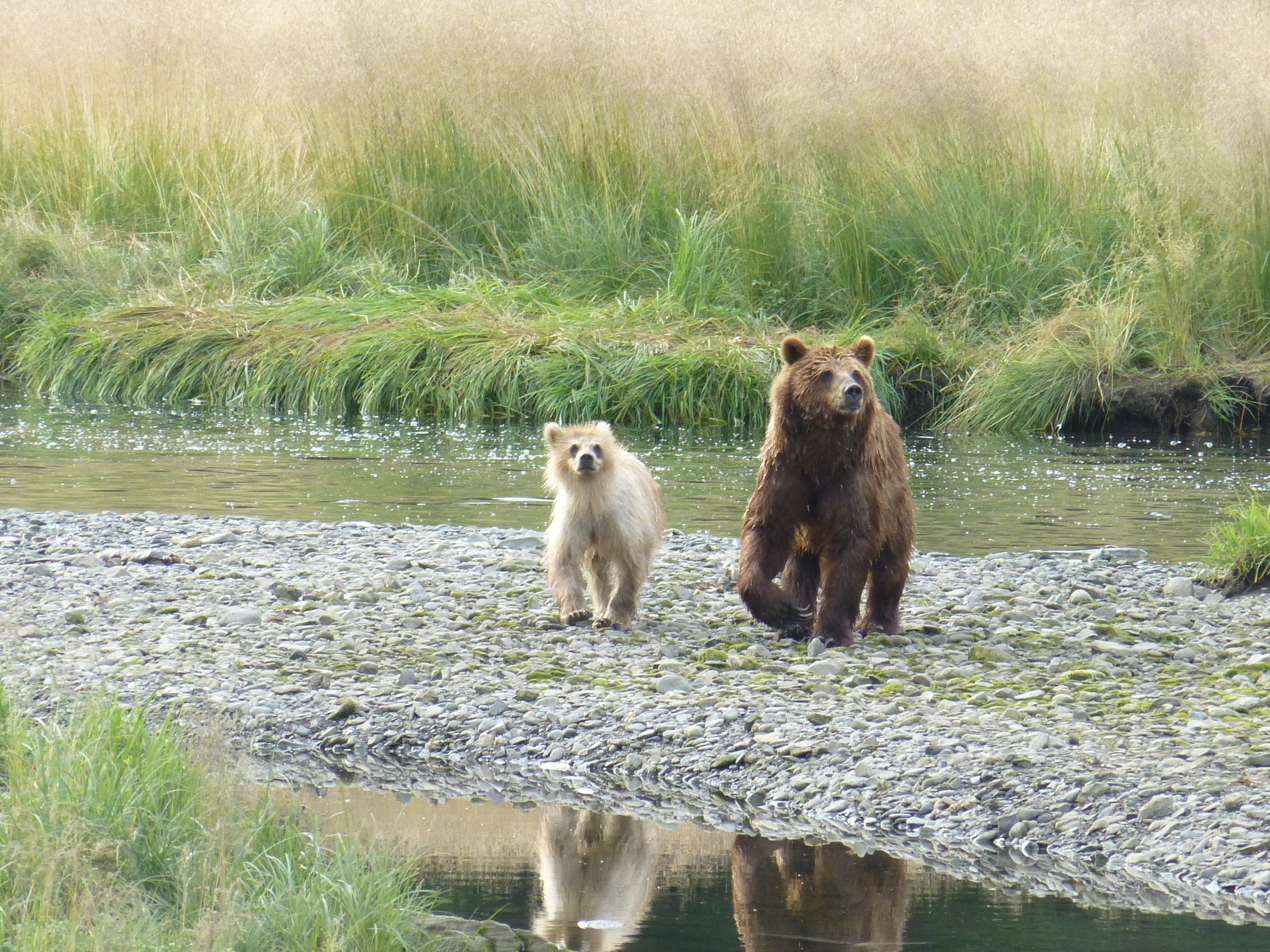
ABC Islands bear and cub on Admiralty Island

The ABC Island bears are usually solitary creatures, except in areas with plentiful food sources. Areas with abundant dietary staples may attract multiple bears. The ABC Islands bears will reach sexual maturity on average at the age of four to seven years, with mating occurring between May and July. Winter hibernation for these bears occurs between the months of October until April, with June at the latest. Pregnant females will give birth to cubs in the den in January or February, with an average litter size of two to three cubs. The cubs remain with the mother for up to three years, during which time she will not get pregnant.

== Relationship to polar bears ==
This brown bear retains all of the physical attributes and behavior associated with the brown bear, however, they do carry mitochondrial DNA that shows a match closer to polar bears than brown bears.

=== Studies ===
==== 1996 ====
A study was conducted on the phylogeography of the brown bears in Alaska, specifically the subspecies that exist within Alaska. The study showed that there was no recent flow of genes from Admiralty to any other islands or mainland. The research for the study began in 1982, when bears on Admiralty were equipped with collars and tracked. These bears did not leave the island during the time. It was believed to be related to strong currents existing in the waters around the island which prevented the bears from swimming to nearby land masses. The study was also looking at the possibility of refugium during the Last Glacial Maximum, in which the Cordilleran Ice Sheet covered much of the Pacific coast. It is believed that certain populations existed only on the ABC Islands. ABC island bears were discovered 0.5 million years ago.

==== 2011 ====
A study on matrilineal polar bear hybridization in relationship to Irish lineage was conducted. The study used the ABC Islands population to support their hypothesis. Comparisons have shown that the ABC Islands had polar bears present during the Last Glacial Maximum, but Ireland most likely did not have proper habitat. Bone isotopic data shows that Irish bears had a similar terrestrial diet to late Pleistocene brown bears from Alaska, and not similar to the marine diet of polar bears. Thus it is shown that the Irish bears have common ancestry with polar bears and the ABC Islands bears.

==== 2012 ====
An international study led by Penn State University and the University of Buffalo has estimated that polar bears split from brown bears between 4 million and 5 million years ago. This would have been due to climate changes, which included ice ages. Hybrids have also been documented within the Northern Beaufort Sea of Arctic Canada. This is an area where the range of polar bears overlaps with the range of brown bears. Data was collected using the entire genome of three brown bears and one black bear in comparison to one modern polar bear and one polar bear remains estimated at 120,000 years old. Data shows that the brown bears and polar bears were isolated at the same time in which black bears became their own species. Brown bears and polar bears continued to remain isolated for a long period of time, theorized due to the presence of ice, before recent changes allowed polar bears and brown bears to interbreed again. It is estimated that polar bears and brown bears began to interbreed again about 160,000 years ago. The study shows that previous estimates of polar bears only existing 600,000 years ago was wrong, and that they have in fact been around much longer – four to five million years ago. This research analysis in particular discovered more genetic similarities between the polar bears and ABC Islands brown bears. This indicates that the study of the ABC Islands bears is also important to understanding the evolution of the polar bear.

==== 2013 ====
Research under Beth Shapiro at University of California, Santa Cruz shows that around 6.5% of the X chromosomes from the ABC Islands bears have recently come from polar bears, in contrast to 1% of the ABC Islands bears' genomes containing polar bear DNA. The study was conducted using seven polar bears, two brown bears, and one black bear to gather ancestral alleles. Based on research using various simulation scenarios, the team concluded that the ABC Islands bears descended from polar bears that gradually converted into brown bears through hybridization of male brown bears dispersing from the Alaskan mainland. It is believed that the present polar bear DNA stems from a group of polar bears that were stranded in Southeast Alaska at the end of the last ice age, and the bears were stranded due to receding ice. This would happen with male brown bears swimming over to the islands and mating with the female polar bears. The study from University of California, Santa Cruz shows that episodes of gene flow between polar bears and brown bears occurred only in isolated populations, without affecting the larger polar bear population, compared to prior hypothesis of past hybridization affecting all polar bear genes to contain brown bear genes as well.

Prior studies have shown that the ABC Islands brown bears are the descendants of polar bears from male-dominated brown bears. The researchers of this study present a model that derives them from a population of polar bears that were stranded after the last glacial period, where brown bears migrated to the island and interbred, leaving the phenotype and genotype of these bears to be primarily brown bear. The research team hypothesizes that this may be a common outcome due to climate change or when an isolated species becomes overrun with an outside species that is able to form fertile hybrids. Final results show that polar bears have no evidence of brown bear ancestry in their genes and ABC Islands bears show clear ancestry of polar bear genes. Fossil remains from the Last Glacial Maximum (LGM) show that there was no habitat suitable for brown bears to occupy during this time. However, fossils in this area did show a concentration of marine mammals, especially ringed seals, which are a common staple to polar bears diet.

== Threats ==
Conflict with humans is a major staple of disturbance to population numbers for the bears. Conflict can include bears entering city populations or threatening hunters on the islands. Other possible disturbances include climate change. As this subspecies of brown bear proves, climate change can have an effect on the species overall.
