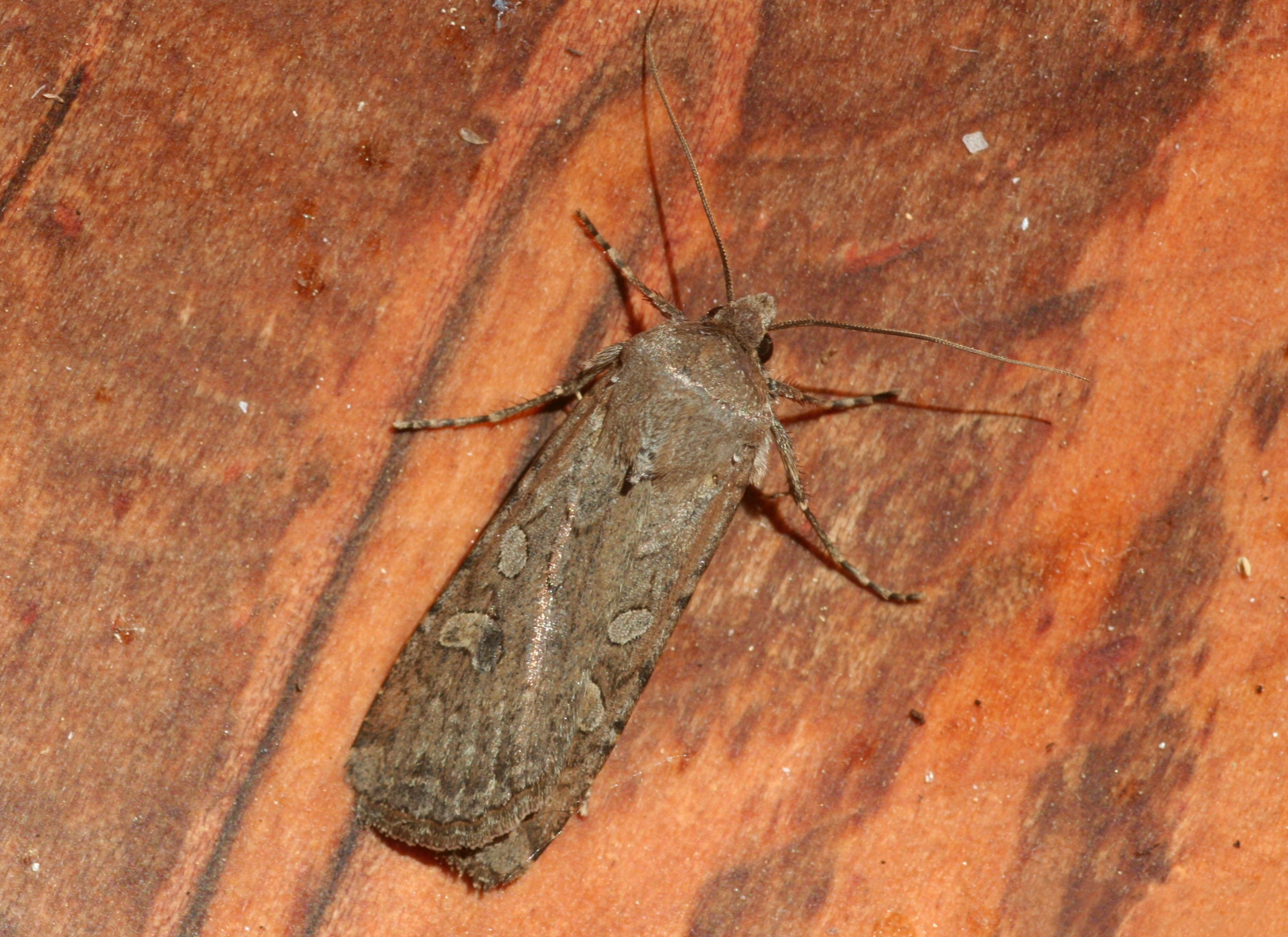

Scientific classification
- Kingdom: Animalia
- Phylum: Arthropoda
- Clade: Pancrustacea
- Class: Insecta
- Order: Lepidoptera
- Superfamily: Noctuoidea
- Family: Noctuidae
- Genus: Euxoa
- Species: E. auxiliaris

Binomial name
- Euxoa auxiliaris (Grote, 1873)

= Army cutworm =

Species of moth

The army cutworm is the immature form of Euxoa auxiliaris. Together with other moths that are locally abundant and that have scales that dislodge from the wings, the adult moth is called a miller moth.

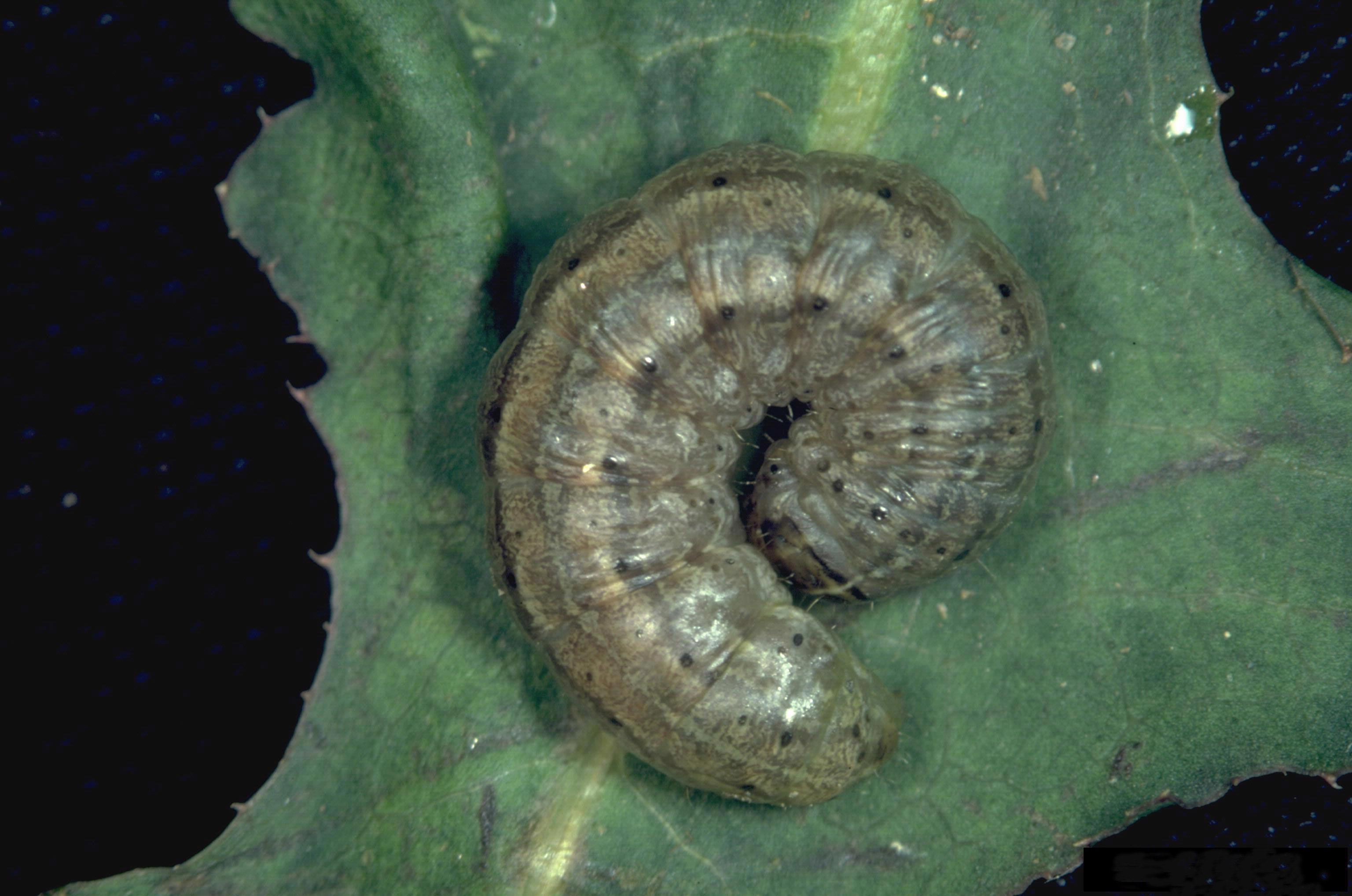
Caterpillar

These native North American larvae consume emerging small grains, alfalfa, and canola in the Great Plains and southern Canada.

On dry, low elevation rangelands of the U.S. Intermountain West, army cutworms consume exotic cheatgrass (Bromus tectorum) and mustards to produce cheatgrass "die-offs." Within these bare areas, the larvae also defoliate native shrubs including four-wing saltbush (Atriplex canescens) and sagebrush (Artemisia spp.).

Army cutworms have only one generation per year. Adult moths lay eggs in the fall at low elevations in the Great Plains and U.S. Intermountain West. Larvae hatch in late fall and feed, mostly at night, through the winter and into spring.

The larvae pupate in the soil in late spring and emerge as adult miller moths. The moths soon migrate to high elevations for the summer. Miller moths are a seasonal nuisance during their seasonal migrations through states including Montana, Idaho, Nevada, Texas, Oklahoma, Colorado, Wyoming, New Mexico, and Kansas.

Moths that emerge in the Great Plains migrate to high elevations in the northern Rocky Mountains, where they are an important food for grizzly bears. Moths that emerge in the Intermountain West migrate to nearby mountain ranges, such as the Jemez Mountains of New Mexico and the mountains of Great Basin National Park in eastern Nevada, where a 2014 Lepidoptera BioBlitz found "blizzard of adult army worm moths (Euxoa auxilliaris), which were present in millions."

Miller moths return to low elevations as the weather cools in fall, but in smaller numbers. Although many consider the moths to be a nuisance, the insects pollinate plants and are food for bats.

== Location ==
Euxoa auxiliaris is found in western North America. They are known to travel to alpine climate regions in late June and early July where they feed at night on the nectar of wildflowers. Army cutworms are one of the richest foods for predators, such as brown bears, in this ecosystem, where up to 72% of the moth's body weight is fat, thus making it more calorie-rich than elk or deer. This is the highest known body fat percentage of any animal.
