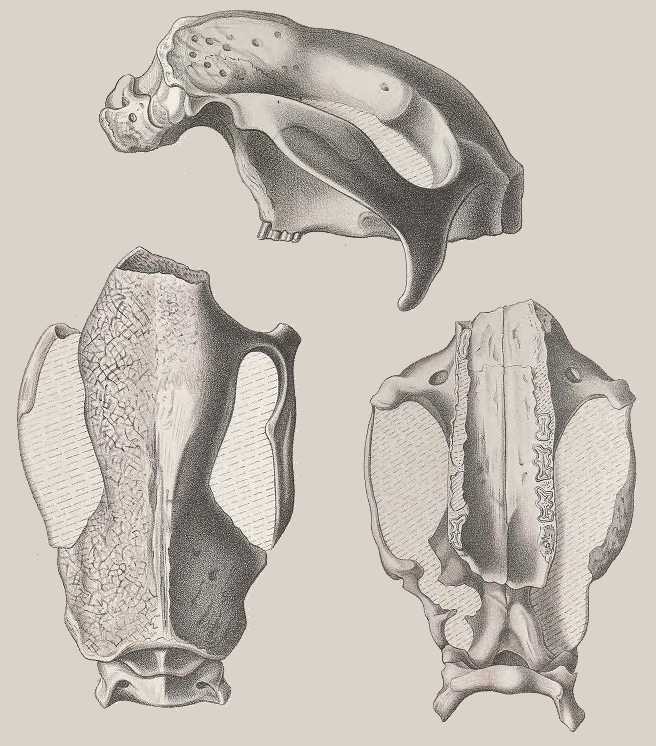
- YMP PU 15612, the type specimen (a skull) of M. anceps, from various angles

Scientific classification
- Kingdom: Animalia
- Phylum: Chordata
- Class: Mammalia
- Order: Cingulata
- Family: Chlamyphoridae
- Subfamily: †Glyptodontinae
- Genus: †Metopotoxus; Ameghino, 1898

Type species
- †Metopotoxus laevatus (Ameghino, 1889)

Species
- †M. anceps Scott, 1903; †M. laevatus (Ameghino, 1889)

= Metopotoxus =

Metopotoxus Temporal range: Santacrucian ~17.5–16.3 Ma

Extinct genus of mammals

Metopotoxus is a dubious extinct genus of glyptodont known from the Early Miocene (Santacrucian) of Patagonia, Argentina. Two species of Metopotoxus have been described, M. laevatus and M. anceps, both from the Santa Cruz Formation.

== Research history ==
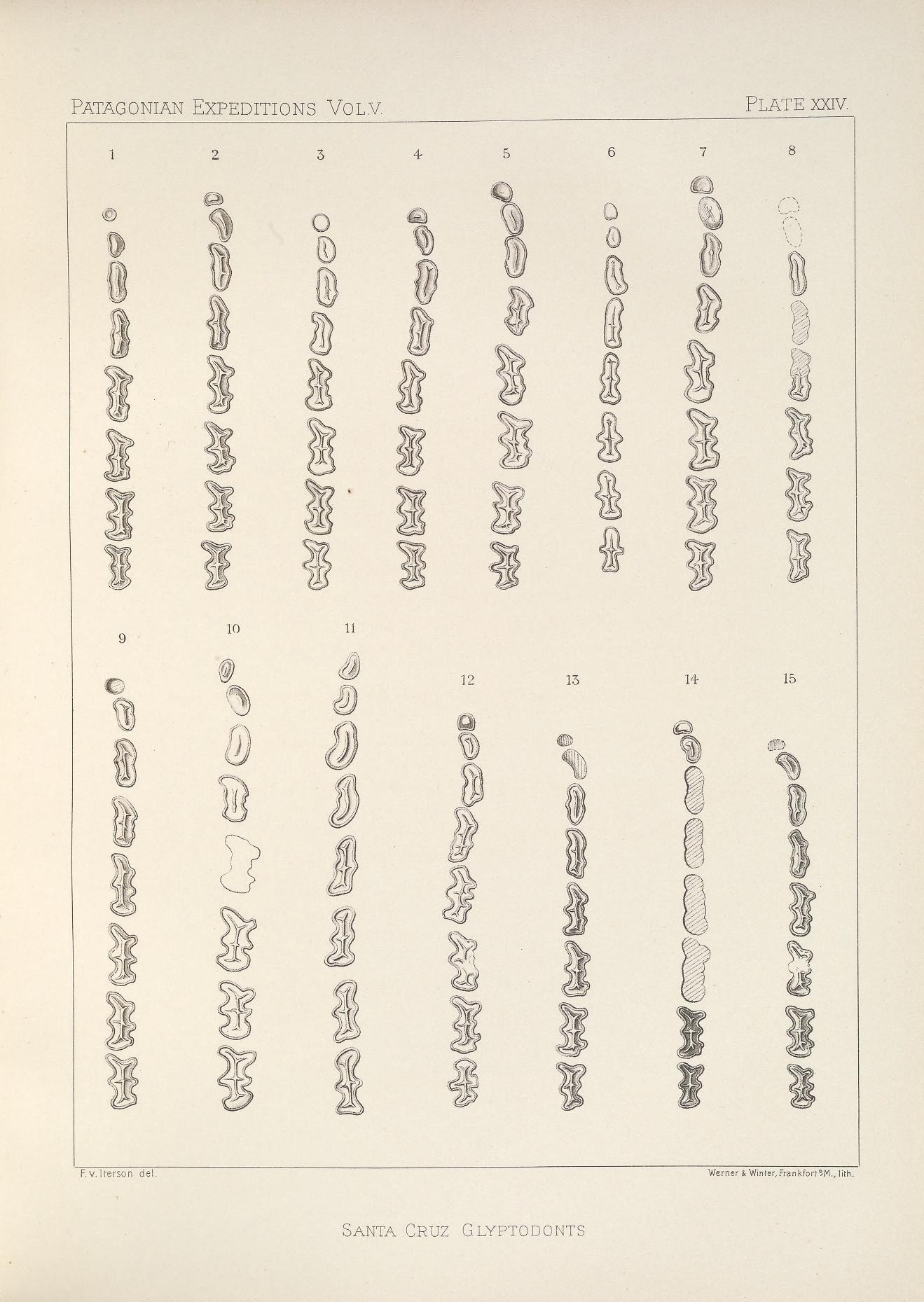
Upper dentition of various Patagonian glyptodonts, including M. anceps (no. 8).

Florentino Ameghino named several new glyptodont genera and species in 1889, based on fossils recovered in the Santacrucian-age Santa Cruz Formation in Patagonia. Among these were the species Asterostemma laevata. The fossil material assigned to this species included plates from the carapace and head shield, as well as two fragments of skulls which preserved some of the upper dentition. In 1891, Alcides Mercerat reassigned A. laevata to the genus Propalaehoplophorus (as P. laevatus) and in 1894, Richard Lydekker considered the fossils to be referrable to the species P. australis.

Ameghino maintained the validity of the species and erected a new genus in 1898, Metopotoxus, with M. laevatus as the type and only species. In 1903, William Berryman Scott reviewed the various glyptodonts from the Santa Cruz Formation and considered Metopotoxus to be sufficiently distinguishable to be considered a valid genus. Scott also named a second species of Metopotoxus, M. anceps, based on a skull without a mandible and four cervical vertebrae. Scott suggested that M. anceps was slightly earlier in age than M. laevatus, though a difference in date could not be determined for certain, and that the genus was ancestral to the later glyptodont Panochthus.

The fossil material assigned to Metopotoxus has not been reviewed or revised since Scott's 1903 study. The validity of the genus has been questioned by several scholars since the mid-20th century. Metopotoxus is sometimes used only with quotation marks, e.g. as "Metopotoxus". In 2012, Sergio F. Vizcaíno, Juan C. Fernicola, and M. Susana Bargo suggested that Metopotoxus could be synonymous with Cochlops, though Cochlops is also in need of revision.

== Description ==
According to Scott's 1903 study, the foremost distinguishing feature of Metopotoxus is the shape of its rostrum, which is short and has a dorsal surface (upper side) that slopes sharply downwards, somewhat similar to Panochthus. This feature is expressed more strongly in M. laevatus than in the possibly older M. anceps. Both the teeth and known carapace plates of Metopotoxus share similarities with those of Propalaehoplophorus. The teeth of Metopotoxus differ from those of Propalaehoplophorus only in the posterior (back) portion of the upper jaw, where their external lobes are divided much more deeply, creating four outer lobes. The carapace plates of Metopoxotus were ornamented similarly to those of Propalaehoplophorus but had a slightly concave or flat central figure and unusually conspicuous piliferous pits. The head shield of Metopotoxus is known only from fragments but may have been different from other glyptodonts. The head plates were apparently separate and had little to no ornamental pattern and a punctate surface. The postero-median (back of the central part of the head) plates were similar to those of Cochlops, having conspicuous pits arranged in two concentric rings, but had a more rugose surface. The occiput of M. anceps is relatively higher and more narrow than in other glyptodonts, except Cochlops debilis, and is more forwardly inclined.

M. anceps is distinguished from M. laevatus by its smaller size, relatively smaller upper teeth, simpler and less pronounced lobes in the teeth, and a less steeply inclined rostrum. The rostrum of M. anceps was still more sharply inclined than that of other glyptodonts known in 1903. The skull of M. anceps measures 14 centimetres (5.5 in) long.

== Classification ==
The limited fossil material assigned to Metopotoxus makes it problematic to include in phylogenetic analyses. In 2007, Darin A. Croft, John J. Flynn and André R. Wyss included Metopotoxus in a phylogenetic analysis conducted for the description of the glyptodont Parapropalaehoplophorus. Less than half of the characters used in the analysis could be scored for Metopotoxus, Glyptatelus, and Neoglyptatelus, and that only about 75 % could be scored for Asterostemma, Eucinepeltus, and Parapropalaehoplophorus. The cladogram below follows Croft, Flynn, and Wyss (2007):

- - Pampatheriidae
  - Glyptodontinae
    - Neoglyptatelus
    - Parapropalaehoplophorus
    - - Glyptatelus
      - - - Propalaehoplophorus
          - Cochlops
        - Eucinepeltus
        - Asterostemma
        - Metopotoxus
        - - Hoplophorus
          - - Doedicurus
            - Glyptodon
