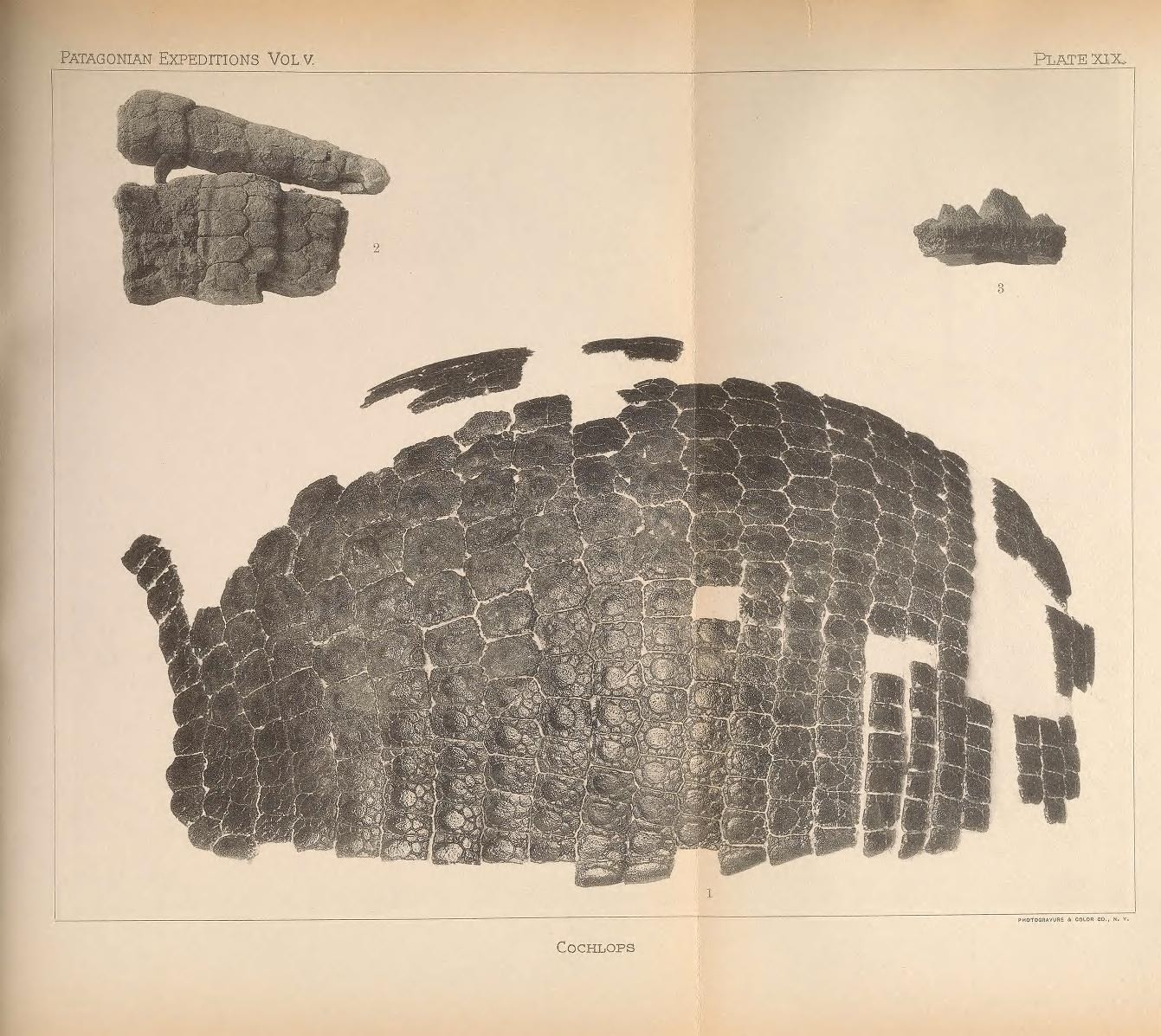
- Carapace of Cochlops

Scientific classification
- Kingdom: Animalia
- Phylum: Chordata
- Class: Mammalia
- Order: Cingulata
- Family: Chlamyphoridae
- Subfamily: †Glyptodontinae
- Genus: †Cochlops; Ameghino, 1889

Type species
- Cochlops muricatus Ameghino, 1889

Species
- C. debilis Ameghino, 1891; C. muricatus Ameghino, 1889

Synonyms
- ?Metopotoxus Ameghino, 1895

= Cochlops =

Cochlops Temporal range: Early-Middle Miocene ~18–12 Ma

Extinct genus of mammals

Cochlops is an extinct genus of glyptodont. It lived from the Early to Middle Miocene, and its fossilized remains have been found in South America.

== Description ==
This animal, like all glyptodonts, had an armor formed by numerous osteoderms fused together, protecting most of its body. Its skull was characterized by a shortened rostrum, a facial profile strongly inclined towards the front, and the occipital plane was oblique. The shape of its skull prefigured that of later genera such as Panochthus. Its carapace was characterized by particularly wrinkled osteoderms, especially compared to other forms of archaic glyptodonts, such as Asterostemma and Propalaehoplophorus; some osteoderms, especially in the pelvic area, had a particular ornamentation, with a large central conical tubercle surrounded by smaller wrinkled tubercles.

== Classification ==
The genus Cochlops was first described in 1889 by Florentino Ameghino, based on fossil remains found in Early Miocene terrains of Argentina. The type species is Cochlops muricatus, and the species C. debilis, described in 1891 by Ameghin, is also ascribed to the genus.

Cochlops was a basal glyptodont, belonging to the tribe Propalaehoplophorini, and related to the genera Propalaehoplophorus, Asterostemma and Eucinepeltus.

Modern cladistic analysis suggests that Propalaehoplophorini is a paraphyletic group. Cladogram after Barasoain et al. 2022:

- Glyptodonts
  - Traditional Glyptodontinae
    - Boreostemma
    - - Glyptotherium
      - Glyptodon
  - "Austral clade"
    - Propalaehoplophorus
    - - Eucinepeltus
      - - Cochlops
        - Palaehoplophorus
        - - Kelenkura
          - - Eosclerocalyptus
            - - - - Plohophorus
                  - Pseudohoplophorus
                - Doedicurinae
                  - Doedicurus
                  - Eleutherocercus
              - - Neosclerocalyptus
                - Hoplophorini
                  - Hoplophorus
                  - - Propanochthus
                    - Panochthus

== Bibliography ==
- F. Ameghino. 1889. Contribución al conocimiento de los mamíferos fósiles de la República Argentina [Contribution to the knowledge of the fossil mammals of the Argentine Republic]. Actas de la Academia Nacional de Ciencias de la República Argentina en Córdoba 6:xxxii-1027
- F. Ameghino. 1891. Nuevos restos de mamíferos fósiles descubiertos por Carlos Ameghino en el Eoceno inferior de la Patagonia austral. – Especies nuevas, adiciones y correcciones [New remains of fossil mammals discovered by Carlos Ameghino in the lower Eocene of southern Patagonia. – New species, additions, and corrections]. Revista Argentina de Historia Natural 1:289-328
- S. F. Vizcaíno, J. C. Fernicola, and M. S. Bargo. 2012. Paleobiology of Santacrucian glyptodonts and armadillos (Xenarthra, Cingulata). In S. F. Vizcaíno, R. F. Kay, M. S. Bargo (eds.), Early Miocene Paleobiology in Patagonia: High-Latitude Paleocommunities of the Santa Cruz Formation 194–215
