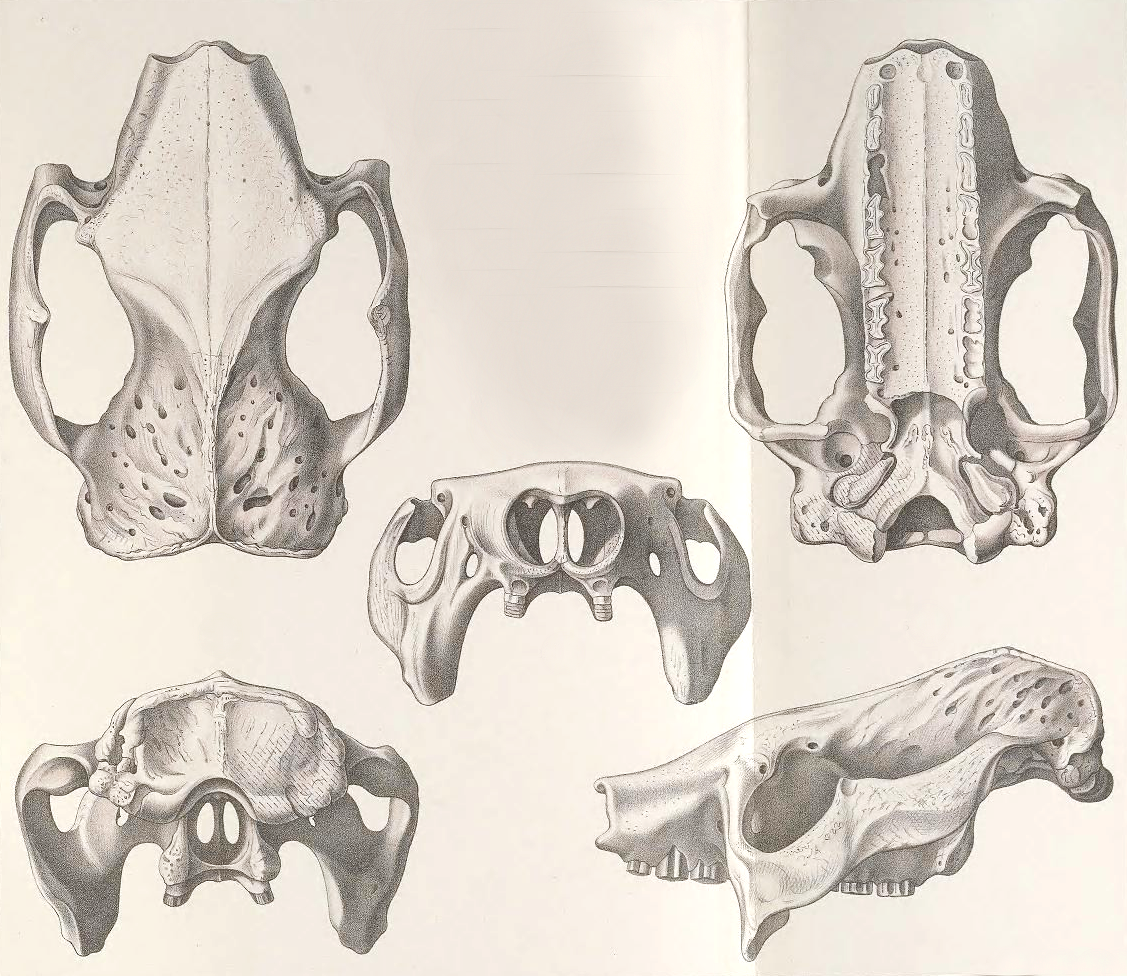
- Skull of the type specimen of E. complicatus, from various angles

Scientific classification
- Kingdom: Animalia
- Phylum: Chordata
- Class: Mammalia
- Order: Cingulata
- Family: Chlamyphoridae
- Subfamily: †Glyptodontinae
- Genus: †Eucinepeltus; Ameghino, 1891

Type species
- †Encinepeltus petesatus Ameghino 1891

Species
- †E. petesatus Ameghino 1891; †E. complicatus Brown 1903; †E. crassus Scott 1903

= Eucinepeltus =

Eucinepeltus Temporal range: Early Miocene- ~17–16 Ma

Extinct genus of mammals

Eucinepeltus (also often called, historically, Encinepeltus) is an extinct genus of glyptodont. It lived during the Early Miocene, and its fossilized remains were discovered in South America.

== Description ==
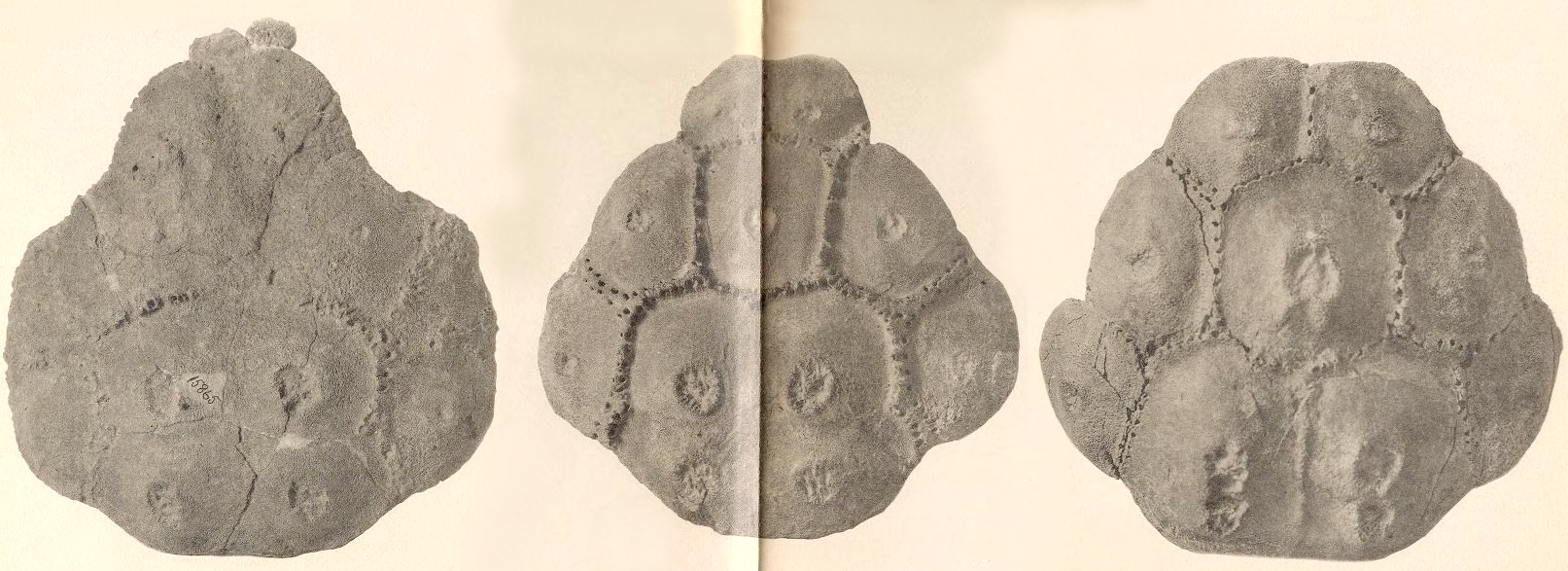
Cephalic shields of E. crassus (left), E. complicatus (center), and E. petesatus (right)

Like all glyptodonts, this genus was characterized by its dorsal armor composed of numerous osteoderms fused together. Eucinepeltus was larger than other basal glyptodonts such as Propalaehoplophorus, with a skull reaching 20 centimeters in length, and wider than most of its relative species. The cephalic shield was composed of 11-15 large welded bony plates, presenting a central convexity often perforated. The skull was depressed and presented a rather elongated muzzle.

The dental characteristics of Eucinepeltus includes lower molars increasing in size from the first to the fifth molar; a first and second lower molars elliptical, convex in the internal side and with a large notch and a corresponding perpendicular groove in the back; bilobed third and fourth lower molars, with an anterior internal lobe much smaller than the following one; the remaining molars were trilobed.

== Classification ==
The genus Eucinepeltus was first described in 1891 by Florentino Ameghino, based on fossilized remains found in Early Miocene terrains from Argentina. The type species is Eucinepeltus petesatus, and the later described species E. complicatus may belong to the genus, although its real affinities are unclear.

Eucinepeltus is the largest genus belonging to the Propalaehoplophorini, a tribe of basal glyptodonts, typical of the Early Miocene, and also including the genera Propalaehoplophorus, Parapropalaehoplophorus and Asterostemma.

Modern cladistic analysis suggests that Propalaehoplophorini is a paraphyletic group. Cladogram after Barasoain et al. 2022:

- Glyptodonts
  - Traditional Glyptodontinae
    - Boreostemma
    - - Glyptotherium
      - Glyptodon
  - "Austral clade"
    - Propalaehoplophorus
    - - Eucinepeltus
      - - Cochlops
        - Palaehoplophorus
        - - Kelenkura
          - - Eosclerocalyptus
            - - - - Plohophorus
                  - Pseudohoplophorus
                - Doedicurinae
                  - Doedicurus
                  - Eleutherocercus
              - - Neosclerocalyptus
                - Hoplophorini
                  - Hoplophorus
                  - - Propanochthus
                    - Panochthus

== Palaeoecology ==
Based on its hypsodonty index (HI) and relative muzzle width index, Eucinepeltus has been theorised to have been a selective browser. The HI of a juvenile cf. Eucinepeltus specimen was similar to that of adult Eucinepeltus, suggesting that adults and juveniles of the genus had a similar ecological niche.

== Bibliography ==
- F. Ameghino. 1891. Nuevos restos de mamíferos fósiles descubiertos por Carlos Ameghino en el Eoceno inferior de la Patagonia austral. – Especies nuevas, adiciones y correcciones [New remains of fossil mammals discovered by Carlos Ameghino in the lower Eocene of southern Patagonia. – New species, additions, and corrections]. Revista Argentina de Historia Natural 1:289-328
- F. Ameghino. 1894. Enumeration synoptique des especes de mammifères fossiles des formations éocènes de Patagonie. Boletin de la Academia Nacional de Ciencias en Cordoba (Republica Argentina) 13:259-452
- S. F. Vizcaíno, J. C. Fernicola, and M. S. Bargo. 2012. Paleobiology of Santacrucian glyptodonts and armadillos (Xenarthra, Cingulata). In S. F. Vizcaíno, R. F. Kay, M. S. Bargo (eds.), Early Miocene Paleobiology in Patagonia: High-Latitude Paleocommunities of the Santa Cruz Formation 194-215
