= Kelenkura =

Kelenkura Temporal range: Late Miocene (Chasicoan) ~9.64–8.8 Ma

Scientific classification
- Kingdom: Animalia
- Phylum: Chordata
- Class: Mammalia
- Infraclass: Placentalia
- Order: Cingulata
- Family: Chlamyphoridae
- Subfamily: †Glyptodontinae
- Genus: †Kelenkura; Barasoain et al. 2022

Species
- K. castroi Barasoain et al. 2022

Extinct genus of mammals belonging to the armadillo order of xenarthrans

Kelenkura is an extinct genus of heavily armored mammals belonging to the subfamily Glyptodontinae, from the family Chlamyphoridae that contain most of the modern armadillos. It was a medium-sized South American animal, distantly related to Doedicurus. Fossils of this genus were recovered in the Arroyo Chasicó Formation and in the Loma de Las Tapias Formation of Argentina in rocks dating back to the Late Miocene epoch.

== Discovery and etymology ==
The presence of glyptodonts in the Arroyo Chasicó Formation was known from fragmentary remains since 1926. In 2005, a new, more complete specimen was unearthed from a river bed in the formation. Alfredo E. Zurita and Silvia A. Aramayo described it in 2007 as PV-UNS-260, a well preserved skeleton from the Arroyo Chasicó including a partially complete skull and carapace, a complete right femur, several caudal rings and a complete caudal tube, alongside several limb bones and isolated osteoderms. They assigned the skeleton to the already existing species Eosclerocalyptus, and estimated it as Huayquerian. In 2011, new glyptodontid remains from the Loma de Las Tapias Formation, known as PVSJ-366, and including an almost complete crania and a fragment of the left femur, were tentatively assignated by Victor H. Contreras and Juan A. Baraldo to Palaehoplophorus and Hoplophractus, the latter being now considered to be a junior synonym of Eosclerocalyptus. In 2016–2017, Cristian G. Oliva examined a number of fossil fragments from the Arroyo Chasicó Formation and suggested the existence of a still undescribed new species of glyptodont from the locality. Finally, in 2022, a new study conducted by Daniel Barasoain et al contested the referral of the Arroyo Chasicó material to Eosclerocalyptus, and named the new genus and species Kelenkura castroi, with PV-UNS-260 as holotype. Other material previously recovered from the Arroyo Chasicó Formation and the Loma de Las Tapias Formation, including PVSJ-366, were assigned to the genus. The holotype material was also reevaluated as belonging to the Chasicoan period.

The genus name, Kelenkura was constructed on the words këlen, which means "tail", and kura, meaning "rock", in the local Mapuche language, referencing the shape of its tail. The species epithet, castroi, honors D. R. Castro, who participated in the discovery of PVSJ-366, one of the complete skulls assigned to the genus.

== Description ==
The skull of Kelenkura was elongated, with a length of 211 mm for the holotype, with an underdevelloped sagittal crest and a narrow occipital area. The few preserved molars were trilobed. The skull was protected by a head shield made of relatively large osteoderms similar to its carapace, which were poorly preserved.

The well preserved, 295 mm long femur of Kelenkura was intermediate in shape between ancient and more modern genus of austral glyptodonts. Kelenkura's total weight in its lifetime was estimated at 160 kg. The carapace, mainly known from the holotype, was made of 35 rows of osteoderms forming a repeated rosette pattern, and was 910 mm high and 1050 mm long. The tail was protected by a caudal armor, composed of caudal rings made of two rows of osteoderm and finished by a completely fused and ornamented caudal tube, known from five complete specimen from the Arroyo Chasicó Formation, and described by its namers as the earliest fully modern caudal tube known for a glyptodont.

== Phylogeny ==
While being originally recovered as a specimen of Eosclerocalyptus tapinocephalus, Kelenkura was erected as an entirely new genus and species on the basis of morphological differences and an earlier age. As a new genus, it stands as the sister group of all the other late neogene and quaternary glyptodonts from the so-called "Austral lineage", whose late members are distinguished from every other mammals by a characteristic caudal tube. Depicted below is a reproduction of the phylogenetic tree presented by Barasoain et al (2022) for glyptodonts, including the newly described Kelenkura.

- Glyptodontinae
  - Boreostemma
  - - Glyptotherium
    - - Glyptodon jatunkhirkhi
      - - Glyptodon reticulatus
        - Glyptodon munizi
- "Austral lineage"
  - Propalaehoplophorus
  - - Eucinepeltus
    - - Cochlops
      - - - Palaehoplophorus
          - Palaehoplophoroides
        - Kelenkura
        - - Eosclerocalyptus
          - - - - Plohophorus
                - Pseudoplohophorus
              - - Doedicurus
                - Eleutherocercus
            - - - Neosclerocalyptus pseudornatus
                - - Neosclerocalyptus ornatus
                  - Neosclerocalyptus paskoensis
              - - Hoplophorus
                - - Propanochthus
                  - Panochthus

== Palaeoecology ==
The Arroyo Chasicó formation was, in the Miocene, on the tip of a peninsula bordered by the Paranaense Sea. Kelenkura was the only glyptodont from the "Austral lineage" extant in the Chasicoan period, but it lived alongside various genera of Cingulata, including the last horned armadillo Epipeltephilus, the Dasypodidae Vetelia and Chasicotatus, the Euphractinae Proeuphractus, and the pampathere Kraglievichia. Other xenarthrans includes several genera of ground sloths, such as the Mylodontidae Octomylodon, the Megalonychidae Protomegalonyx, the Nothrotheriidae Xyophorus and Chasicobradys, and the Megatheriidae Anisodontherium. Several genera of rodents were recovered from the formation, such as the earliest genus of tuco-tucos, maras and capybaras such as Cardiomys, Procardiomys and Cardiatherium, Octodontidae such as Chasicomys and Chasichimys, the Echimyidae Pattersomys, the plain viscacha Lagostomus telenkechanum and its relative Prolagostomus, and large-sized Dinomyidae like Carlesia. Meridiungulates were also present in the formation, with Litopterna genera such as the Macraucheniidae Cullinia and the Proterotheriidae Neobrachytherium, while notoungulates were represented by genera such as the large-sized late surviving Homalodotheriidae Chasicotherium, the Toxodontidae Paratrigodon, the Interatheriidae Protypotherium, the Mesotheriidae Typotheriopsis, and the Hegetotheriidae Paedotherium, Pseudohegetotherium and Hemihegetotherium. The largest predators were the Sparassodonta Pseudolycopsis cabrerai and Lycopsis viverensis, and the small terror bird Psilopterus.
