= Lomaphorelus =

Lomaphorelus Temporal range: Middle Eocene

Scientific classification
- Kingdom: Animalia
- Phylum: Chordata
- Class: Mammalia
- Order: Cingulata
- Family: Chlamyphoridae
- Subfamily: †Glyptodontinae
- Genus: †Lomaphorelus; Ameghino, 1902
- Species: †L. depstus

Binomial name
- †Lomaphorelus depstus Ameghino, 1902

Lomaphorelus is a dubious extinct genus of glyptodont known from the Middle Eocene of Patagonia. One species of Lomaphorelus has been described, L. depstus, which is known from only a single fossil armor scute. The Middle Eocene age of the scute makes Lomaphorelus one of the earliest known glyptodonts.

== Research history ==
Lomaphorelus depstus was described by the Argentine paleontologist Florentino Ameghino in 1902. The species was based on a single broken fossil armor scute, collected in Middle Eocene deposits in the Musters Formation in Patagonia, in the so-called "Astraponotus beds". Ameghino did not provide a more specific locality where the fossil was found. The Eocene age of the fossil placed Lomaphorelus among the earliest known glyptodonts. The generic name Lomaphorelus is the diminutive form of the name Lomaphorus, another glyptodont. Ameghino considered the perforations of the plates referred to Lomaphorelus to resemble the arrangement in Lomaphorus.

In 1947, the American paleontologist George Gaylord Simpson commented that Lomaphorelus was "very inadequately known". In 1948, Simpson considered Lomaphorelus to "probably represent a valid genus" but that its "affinities [could] hardly be guessed". Vizcaino et al. (2003) considered Lomaphorelus to be a nomen dubium. Fernicola et al. (2018) agreed with this assessment and likewise designated Lomaphorelus as a nomen dubium.

== Description ==
Lomaphorelus was a relatively small glyptodont, believed by Ameghino to have been similar in size to Proeutatus. Ameghino measured the sole scute referred to the genus to be 18 millimeters long, 15 millimeters wide, and 5–6 millimeters thick. Simpson measured it to be 20 millimeters long, 13 millimeters wide, and 5–7 millimeters thick. Simpson considered the scute to be "unlike any other known in details" and diagnosed Lomaphorelus as follows:

Small scute with dense, glistening surface, obscurely marked into a large central area with a vague longitudinal elevation and small intercalary areas; numerous radiating punctuations, especially on the very vague scale boundaries.

== Classification ==
Under earlier glyptodont classification schemes, Lomaphorelus was traditionally considered part of the "Glyptatelinae" subfamily, closely related to genera such as Glyptatelus, Clypeotherium, and Neoglyptatelus.
