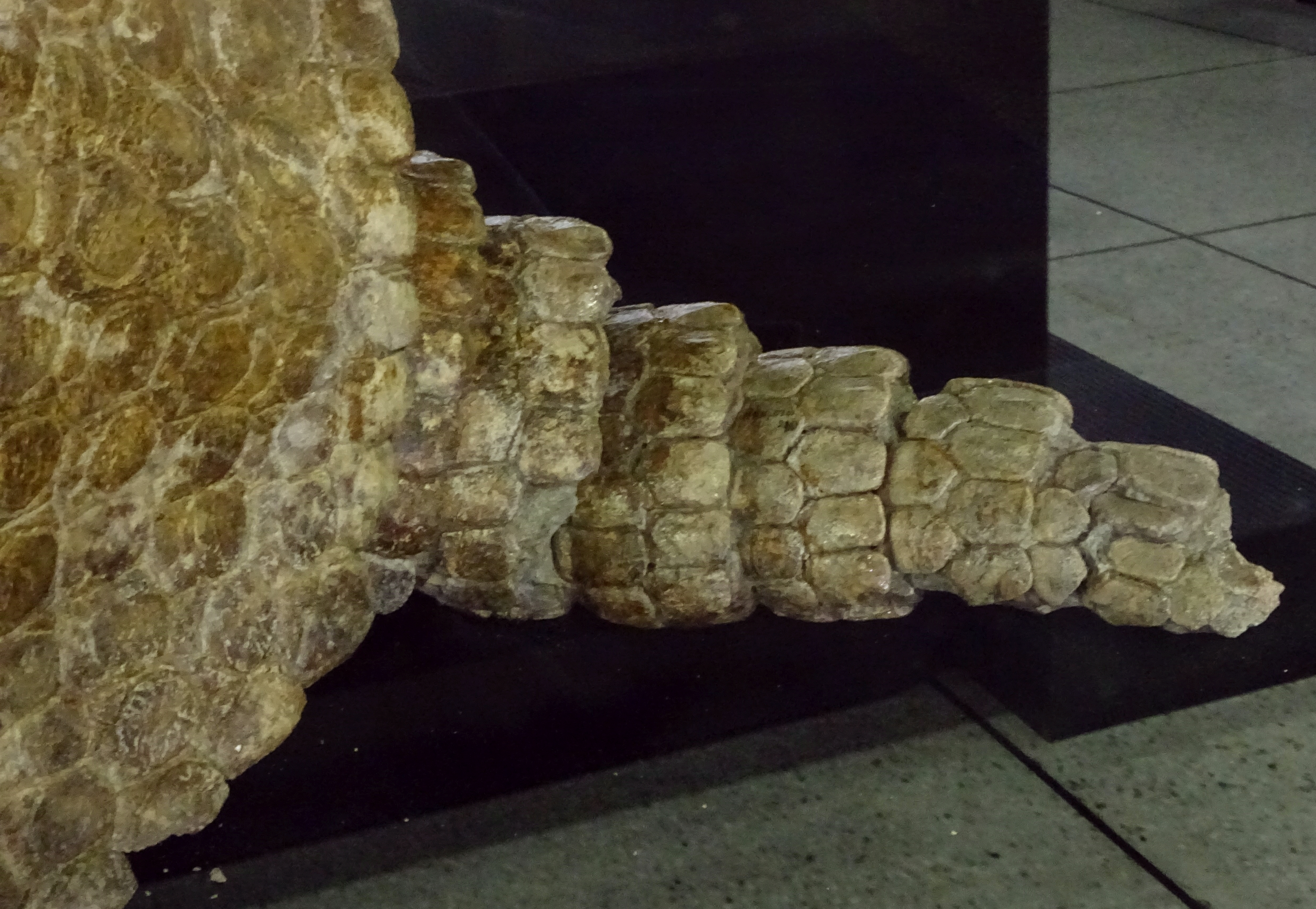
- Tail of Boreostemma from the Honda Group

Scientific classification
- Kingdom: Animalia
- Phylum: Chordata
- Class: Mammalia
- Order: Cingulata
- Family: Chlamyphoridae
- Subfamily: †Glyptodontinae
- Genus: †Boreostemma; Carlini et al. 2008

Type species
- †Boreostemma pliocena Carlini et al. 2008

Species
- B. acostae Villarroel 1983; B. gigantea Carlini et al. 1997; B. pliocena Carlini et al. 2008; B. venezolensis Simpson 1947

= Boreostemma =

Boreostemma Temporal range: Mid Miocene-Early Pliocene (Laventan-Montehermosan) ~13–5 Ma

Extinct genus of mammals

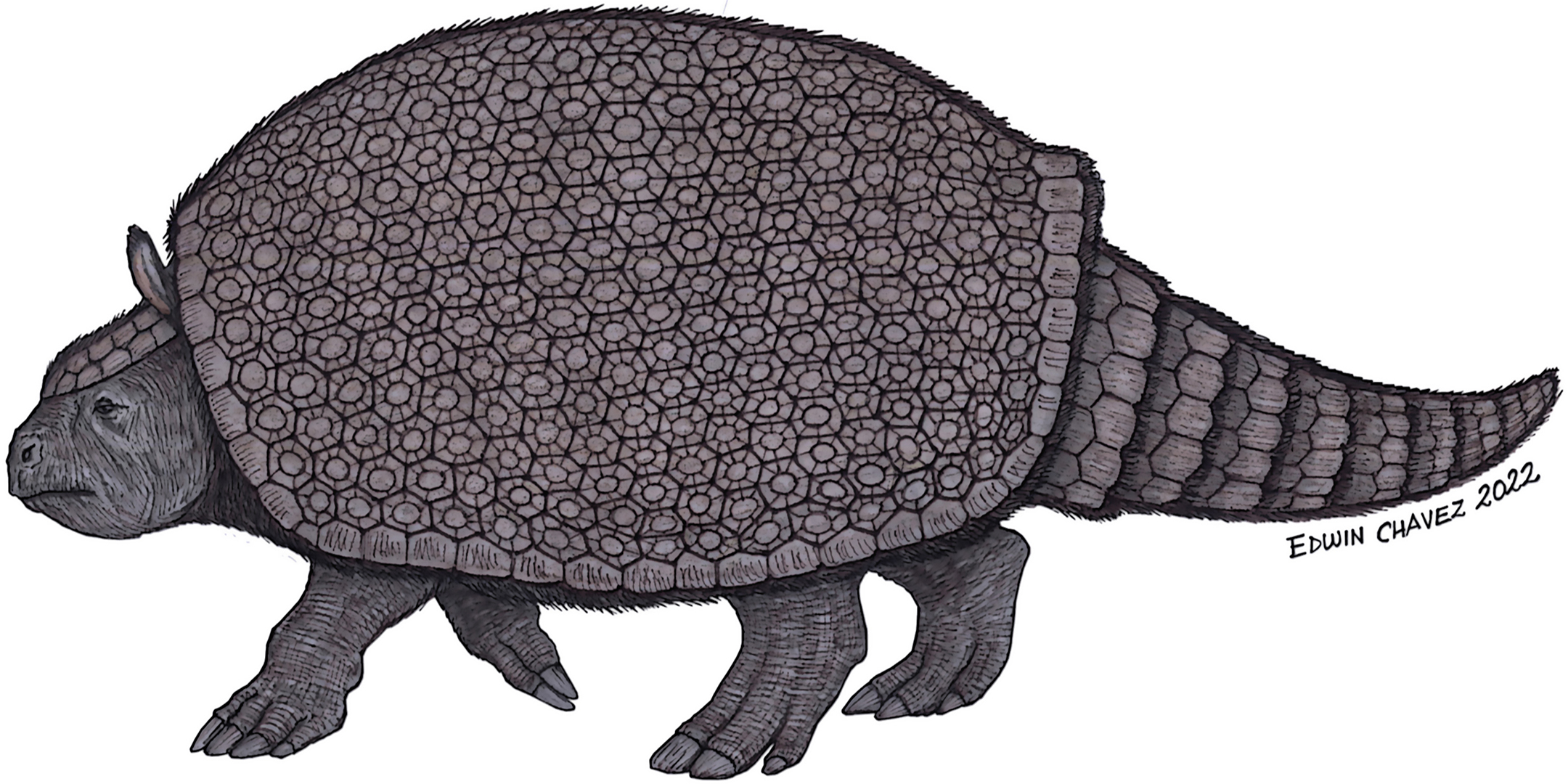
Paleoart of Boreostemma venezolensis. Created by Edwin Chávez "Disfrasaurio".

Boreostemma is an extinct genus of glyptodonts from northern South America. Fossils assigned to the genus were first described as belonging to Asterostemma from southern South America, but have been placed in the new genus Boreostemma by Carlini et al. in 2008. The type species is B. pliocena. Fossils of Boreostemma have been found in the Honda Group of Colombia, in Peru and Venezuela.

== Etymology ==
The genus name Boreostemma is a combination of stemma, taken from Asterostemma, and boreo is derived from borealis, meaning "northern", to distinguish the northern South American genus from the southern Asterostemma.

== Taxonomy ==
Boreostemma has been placed as closely related to the later Glyptodon and Glyptotherium. Cladogram after Barasoain et al. 2022:

- Glyptodonts
  - Traditional Glyptodontinae
    - Boreostemma
    - - Glyptotherium
      - Glyptodon
  - "Austral clade"
    - Propalaehoplophorus
    - - Eucinepeltus
      - - Cochlops
        - Palaehoplophorus
        - - Kelenkura
          - - Eosclerocalyptus
            - - - - Plohophorus
                  - Pseudohoplophorus
                - Doedicurinae
                  - Doedicurus
                  - Eleutherocercus
              - - Neosclerocalyptus
                - Hoplophorini
                  - Hoplophorus
                  - - Propanochthus
                    - Panochthus

=== Species ===
Locations of Boreostemma and Asterostemma fossil finds in South America
Asterostemma
B. acostae & B. gigantea
B. pliocena (type)
B. venezolensis
Boreostemma sp.

Four species have been described in the genus Boreostemma. Unspecified Boreostemma fossils were found in the Ipururo Formation of the department of Ucayali, Amazonian Peru. Asterostemma contains the type species A. depressa and several nomina dubia. The genus has been found in the Early Miocene (Santacrucian in the SALMA classification) Santa Cruz Formation of the province of Santa Cruz, Argentina and in the Solimões Formation in the state of Acre, Amazonian Brazil.

B. pliocena

The type species B. pliocena was described in 2008 by Carlini et al. based on 30 osteoderms palate fragment with M6-7 alveoli. Fossils have been described from the type locality along the road to Tío Gregorio in the Codore Formation at the Lagerstätte of Urumaco.

B. gigantea

B. gigantea was described as Asterostemma gigantea in 1997 by Carlini et al. based on a partial skeleton. Fossils have been recovered at the Duke Localities 32, 108, 113, 114 and 121W in the La Victoria Formation of the Honda Group at the Konzentrat-Lagerstätte La Venta.

B. acostae

B. acostae was described as Asterostemma acostae in 1983 by Carlos Villarroel based on a carapace fragment with 44 plates. Fossils have been found in the Cerbatana Member, and the Chunchullo Sandstone of the La Victoria Formation, of the Honda Group at the Konzentrat-Lagerstätte La Venta.

B. venezolensis

B. venezolensis was described as Asterostemma venezolensis in 1947 by George Gaylord Simpson, based on most of the carapace and the anterior end of the lower jaw, including teeth. Fossils have been uncovered from the Santa Inés Formation along the banks of the Güere River in the state of Anzoátegui in Venezuela.

== Gallery ==
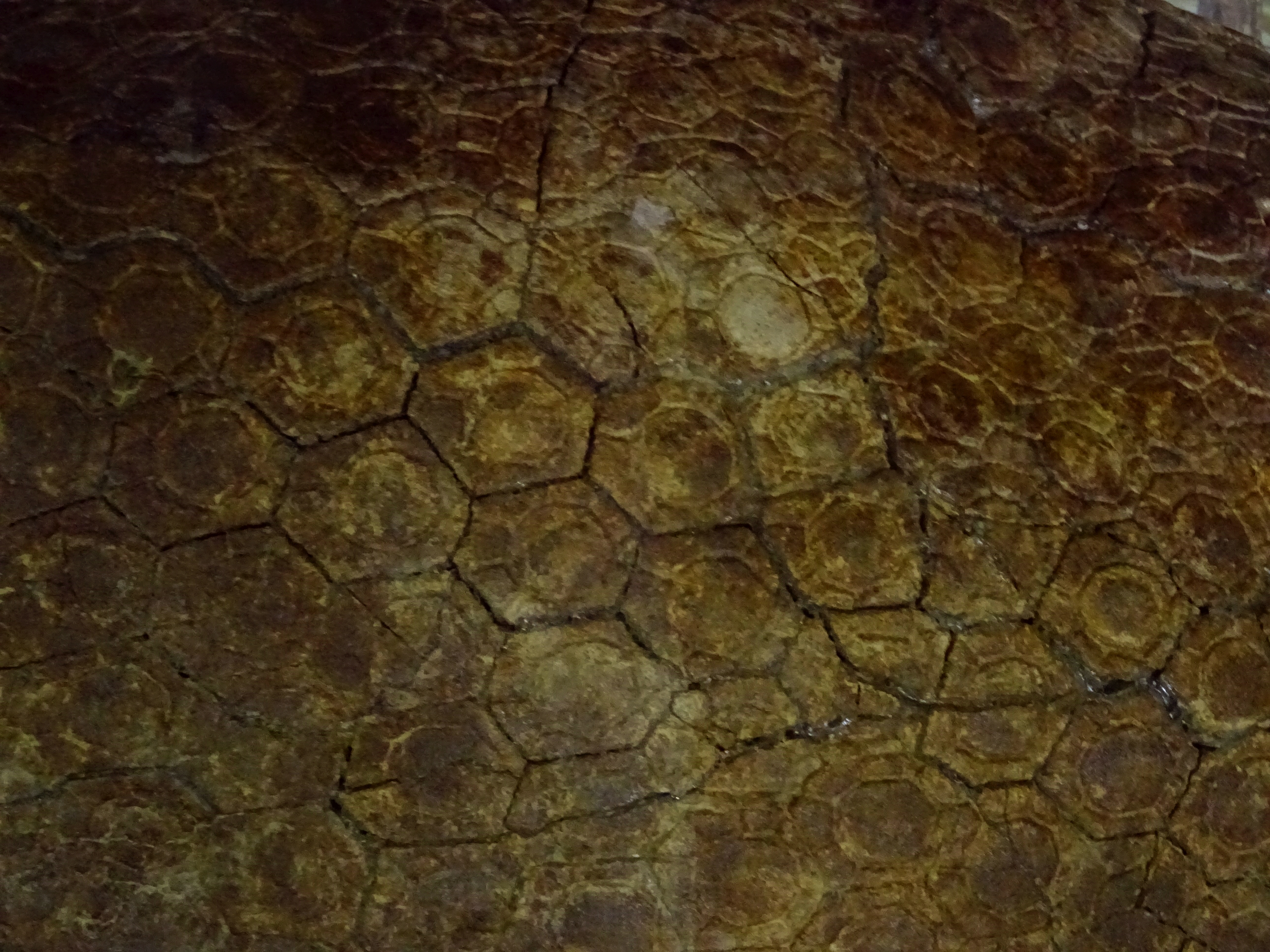
Carapace of Boreostemma

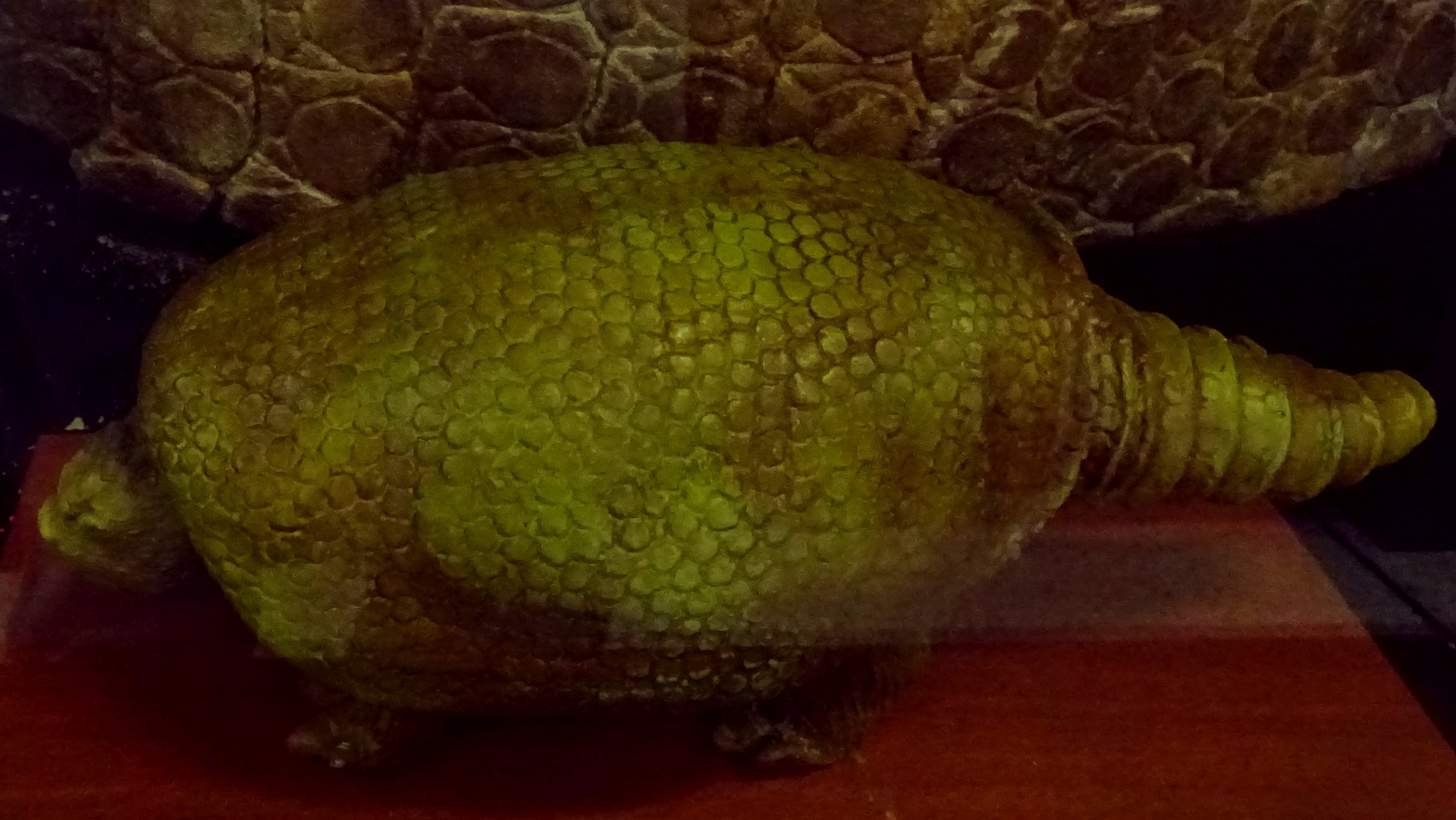
Reconstruction

== See also ==
- List of fossiliferous stratigraphic units in Colombia
- Glyptodon
