= Peiranoa =

Peiranoa Temporal range: Late Miocene

Scientific classification
- Kingdom: Animalia
- Phylum: Chordata
- Class: Mammalia
- Order: Cingulata
- Family: Chlamyphoridae
- Subfamily: †Glyptodontinae
- Genus: †Peiranoa; Castellanos, 1946
- Species: †P. bullifera

Binomial name
- †Peiranoa bullifera Castellanos, 1946

Peiranoa is an extinct genus of glyptodont known from the Late Miocene of Argentina. One species of Peiranoa has been described, P. bullifera, known from fossil armor plates found in the Yocavil Valley in Tucumán.

== Research history ==
Peiranoa bullifera was described by the Argentine paleontologist Alfredo Castellanos in 1946. The known fossil material was discovered in Late Miocene-age deposits by Federico Hennig in the Yocavil Valley in Tucumán, Argentina, during an expedition between 22 May and 7 June 1945. The type material consisted of three large fragments of the last third of the carapace, smaller fragments from other parts of the carapace, loose armor plates, and parts of the tail armor. The fossils were found together and likely belong to the same specimen, which Castellanos believed to have been a juvenile. The generic name Peiranoa honors Abel Peirano, a distinguished Argentine geologist and a personal friend of Castellanos.

== Description ==
Peiranoa is distinguished from other glyptodonts by the ornamentation of the armor in its pelvic region. Each armor plate has a sphere-like protrusion in the center, similar to armor plates of Nopachtus. The protrusion is surrounded by a radiating peripheral rim, similar to armor plates referred to Lomaphorus, Lomaphorops, and Trachycalyptus. The central protrusion decreases in height in some armor plates, appearing flat and disc-like. The tail armor of Peiranoa was similar to that of Trachycalyptus, Lomaphorops, and Urotherium. In the pelvic region, armor plates are mostly hexagonal in shape, but pentagonal shapes become gradually more common towards the edges of the carapace and rectangular shapes are common near the edges.

The armor plates of the Peiranoa type specimen, belonging to a juvenile individual, indicate a glyptodont slightly smaller than Nopachtus and larger than Lomaphorops.

== Classification ==
Under traditional glyptodont classification schemes, Peiranoa was placed in the tribe 'Lomophorini', alongside the genera such as Lomaphorus, Urotherium, Lomaphorops, and Trachycalyptoides.
