= Neuryurus =

Neuryurus Temporal range: Late Pliocene-Early Holocene (Uquian-Lujanian) ~2.5–0.009 Ma

Scientific classification
- Kingdom: Animalia
- Phylum: Chordata
- Class: Mammalia
- Order: Cingulata
- Family: Chlamyphoridae
- Subfamily: †Glyptodontinae
- Genus: †Neuryurus; Ameghino, 1889

Type species
- †Neuryurus rudis Gervais, 1878

Species
- N. giganteus Rovereto 1914; N. interundatus Ameghino 1885; N. rudis Gervais 1878; N. solidus Rovereto 1914

Synonyms
- Euryurus Gervais & Ameghino 1878

Extinct genus of mammals

Neuryurus is an extinct genus of glyptodont. It lived from the Late Pliocene to the Early Holocene, and its fossilized remains were discovered in South America.

== Description ==
This genus, like all glyptodonts, had a heavy armor formed by osteoderms fused together, protecting most of its body. Neuryurus was large-sized, reaching three meters in length. The carapace resembled that of other glyptodonts such as Trachycalyptus, with thick and rectangular-shaped osteoderms, loosely fused by a serrated suture. The outer surface of those osteoderms was evenly dotted. The tail was protected by a caudal tube; this structure, in Neuryurus, was depressed, not consolidated and mostly formed by osteoderms similar to each others. The lateral osteoderms had large elliptical structures, with a central conical prominence, reminding those of Hoplophorus and Panochthus. Some marginal plates had an elevated and conical central area. The cephalic shield resembled that of Panochthus, due to the presence of slightly marked peripheral tubercles.

== Classification ==
The genus Neuryurus was first established in 1889 by Florentino Ameghino, replacing the name Euryurus that Ameghino and Paul Gervais had described a few years earlier but already used by a genus of millipedes. Neuryurus is mostly known from its type species, Neuryurus rudis, typical of the Early and Middle Pleistocene deposits of Argentina. Fossils attributed to the genus, but not to the type species, are known from Argentine terrains dating from the Late Pliocene. The most recent fossils date from the Late Pleistocene and the Early Holocene, and have been found in Uruguay, Brazil and Argentina. Two other species, N. interundatus and N. giganteus, have also been attributed to the genus.

Neuryurus is an unusual genus within the glyptodonts; the peculiar morphology of its caudal tube distinguishes it from all other genera of glyptodonts, even if it is supposed to be related to the tribe Hoplophorini. It may have been similar to the genus Panochthus, but its closest relative seems to have been Urotherium.

== Bibliography ==
- F. Ameghino. 1889. Contribución al conocimiento de los mamíferos fósiles de la República Argentina [Contribution to the knowledge of the fossil mammals of the Argentine Republic]. Actas de la Academia Nacional de Ciencias de la República Argentina en Córdoba 6:xxxii-1027
- Zurita, A. E., Soibelzon, E. & Carlini, A. A. 2006. Neuryurus (Xenarthra, Glyptodontidae) in the Lujanian (late Pleistocene–early Holocene) of the pampean region. Neues Jahrbuch fu¨r Geologie und Palaontologie-Monatshefte 2, 78–88.
- Zurita, A. E. & Ferrero, B. S. 2007. Neuryurus Ameghino (Mammalia, Glyptodontidae) en el Lujanense (Pleistoceno tardı´o) en la Mesopotamia de Argentina: su registro en un a´mbito paleobiogeografico particular. Resu´menes Reunion Anual deComunicaciones de la Asociacion Paleontologica Argentina, Corrientes, Argentina, 19.
- Zurita, A. E. & Ferrero, B. S. 2009. A new species of Neuryurus Ameghino (Mammalia, Glyptodontidae) from the late Pleistocene of the Mesopotamic region of Argentina. Geobios, Volume 42, Issue 5, Pages 663–673.
- Zurita, A. E., Soibelzon, E., Scillato-Yané, G. J. and Cenizo, M. 2009. The earliest record of Neuryurus Ameghino (Mammalia, Glyptodontidae, Hoplophorinae). Alcheringa: An Australasian Journal of Palaeontology,33:1,49 — 57
- Perea, D., P. Toriño, and M. Ghizzoni. 2019. First endoskeletal remains of Neuryurus (Xenarthra, Glyptodontidae), an emended diagnosis of the genus, and body mass estimations. Journal of Vertebrate Paleontology. DOI: 10.1080/02724634.2019.1668400.
