= Palaehoplophorus =

Palaehoplophorus Temporal range: Middle-Late Miocene ~16–7 Ma

Scientific classification
- Kingdom: Animalia
- Phylum: Chordata
- Class: Mammalia
- Order: Cingulata
- Family: Chlamyphoridae
- Subfamily: †Glyptodontinae
- Genus: †Palaehoplophorus; Ameghino, 1883

Type species
- †Palaehoplophorus antiquus Ameghino 1883

Species
- P. antiquus Ameghino 1883; P. meridionalis Ameghino 1904; P. pressulus Ameghino 1885; P. scalabrinii Ameghino 1883

Extinct genus of mammals

Palaehoplophorus (also spelled, historically, Palaeohoplophorus) is an extinct genus of glyptodont. It lived from the Middle to the Late Miocene, and its fossilized remains were discovered in South America.

== Description ==
This animal, like all glyptodonts, had a thick carapace, composed of numerous osteoderm fused together, covering a large part of its body. The plates of its carapace bore a medium-sized, depressed central figure, surrounded by a wrinkled peripheral zone, divided by barely defined furrows and irregular tubercles. Large perforations opened in the furrows around the central figure and between the peripheral figures. The tail was protected by a series of mobile osteoderm rings, presenting a similar ornamentation, and by a terminal straight and cylindrical "tube", formed by contiguous, rounded osteoderms, separated by deep grooves with large perforations, similar to those of the carapace. The terminal and lateral osteoderms were almost identical to each other.

== Classification ==
The genus Palaehoplophorus was first described in 1883 by Florentino Ameghino, based on fossil remains found in Argentina in Middle Miocene terrains. Several species have been attributed to the genus, such as Palaehoplophorus antiquus, P. disjunctus, P. meridionalis, P. pressulus, P. scalabrinii, from the Middle to the Late Miocene. Several of these species may be synonymous with each other.

Palaehoplophorus was identified as an archaic representative of the glyptodonts, notably due to the morphology of its caudal tube, with barely differentiated osteoderms, a characteristic generally considered primitive. The ornamentation of the osteoderms was however rather derived, which tends to confirm that this genus wasn't nested in a basal position of the group. Palaehoplophorus was a member of the tribe Hoplophorini, along with its relatives Hoplophorus and Plohophorus.

Modern cladistic analysis suggests that Palaehoplophorus is more closely related to other glyptodonts with caudal tubes like Doedicurus than to Glyptodon. Cladogram after Barasoain et al. 2022:

- Glyptodonts
  - Traditional Glyptodontinae
    - Boreostemma
    - - Glyptotherium
      - Glyptodon
  - "Austral clade"
    - Propalaehoplophorus
    - - Eucinepeltus
      - - Cochlops
        - Palaehoplophorus
        - - Kelenkura
          - - Eosclerocalyptus
            - - - - Plohophorus
                  - Pseudohoplophorus
                - Doedicurinae
                  - Doedicurus
                  - Eleutherocercus
              - - Neosclerocalyptus
                - Hoplophorini
                  - Hoplophorus
                  - - Propanochthus
                    - Panochthus

== Bibliography ==
- F. Ameghino. 1883. Sobre una nueva colección de mamíferos fósiles recogidos por el Profesor Scalabrini en Las Barrancas del Paraña [On a collection of fossil mammals collected by Professor Scalabrini in Las Barrancas of Paraña]. Boletin de la Academia Nacional de Ciencias 5(3):55-104
- F. Ameghino. 1885. Nuevos restos de mamíferos fósiles Oligocenos recogidos por el Profesor Pedro Scalabrini y pertenecientes al Museo Provincial de la ciudad del Parana [New remains of Oligocene fossil mammals collected by Professor Pedro Scalabrini and belonging to the Provincial Museum of the city of Parana]. Boletín de la Academia Nacional de Ciencias 8:1-205
- F. Ameghino. 1889. Contribución al conocimiento de los mamíferos fósiles de la República Argentina [Contribution to the knowledge of the fossil mammals of the Argentine Republic]. Actas de la Academia Nacional de Ciencias de la República Argentina en Córdoba 6:xxxii-1027
- F. Ameghino. 1904. Nuevas especies de mamíferos, cretáceos y terciarios de la República Argentina [New species of mammals, Cretaceous and Tertiarty, from the Argentine Republic]. Anales de la Sociedad Cientifica Argentina 56–58:1-142
- G. J. Scillato-Yané, F. Góis, A. E. Zurita, A. A. Carlini, L. R. González-Ruiz, C. M. Krmpotic, C. Oliva and M. Zamorano. 2013. Los cingulata (Mammalia, Xenarthra) del "Conglomerado Osífero" (Mioceno tardío) de la Formación Ituzaingó de Entre Ríos, Argentina. In D. Brandoni, J.I. Noriega (eds.), El Neógeno de la Mesopotamia argentina 14:118-134
