= Stromaphorus =

Stromaphorus Temporal range: Late Miocene ~7–6 Ma

Scientific classification
- Domain: Eukaryota
- Kingdom: Animalia
- Phylum: Chordata
- Class: Mammalia
- Order: Cingulata
- Family: Chlamyphoridae
- Subfamily: †Glyptodontinae
- Genus: †Stromaphorus; Castellanos, 1926

Type species
- Stromaphorus compressidens Moreno & Mercerat, 1891

Species
- S. compressidens Moreno & Mercerat, 1891; S. cuneiformis Castellanos, 1926

Extinct genus of mammals

Stromaphorus is an extinct genus of Glyptodont. It lived during the Late Miocene, and its fossilized remains were discovered in South America.

== Description ==
This animal, like all glyptodonts, had a strong carapace covering almost its entire body, consisting of numerous osteoderms fused together. The tail was protected by four rings of osteoderms, the last of which being fused with a terminal caudal tube, similar to that of Neosclerocalyptus. Unlike Neosclerocalyptus, the large lateral osteoderms covering the skull of Stromaphorus were contiguous. Its skull was narrow and elevated in the back. Its teeth were large and tall. Its feet were rather slender, with elongated metapods and phalanges.

== Classification ==
The genus Stromaphorus was first described in 1926 by Castellanos. Two species were attributed to the genus, Stromaphorus compressidens and S. cuneiformis, both from Late Miocene Argentina.

Stromaphorus belonged to the tribe Hoplophorini, a widespread and diverse clade of glyptodonts, including genera such as Hoplophorus and Neosclerocalyptus. However, the precise phylogenetic relationships between Stromaphorus and the other members of its clade are still unclear.

== Bibliography ==
- Castellanos, A. 1926. Sobre un nuevo gliptodóntido chapadmalense, Urotherium simplex n. gen. et n. sp. y las formas afines. Anales del Museo Nacional de Historia Natural Bernardino Rivadavia 34: 263–278.
- Porpino, K.O., Fernicola, J.C., and Bergqvist, L.P. 2010. Revisiting the intertropical brazilian species Hoplophorus euphractus (Cingulata, Glyptodontoidea) and the phylogenetic affinities of Hoplophorus. Journal of Vertebrate Paleontology 30: 911–927.
- Zamorano, M. & Brandoni, D., 2013. Phylogenetic analysis of the Panochthini (Xenarthra, Glyptodontidae), with remarks on their temporal distribution. Alcheringa 37, 1–10. ISSN 0311-5518.
- González Ruiz, L.R., Reato, A., Cano, M., and Martínez, O. 2017. Old and new specimens of a poorly known glyptodont from the Miocene of Patagonia and their biochronological implications. Acta Palaeontologica Polonica 62 (1): 181–194.
