= Protoglyptodon =

Protoglyptodon Temporal range: Late Miocene ~9–7 Ma

Scientific classification
- Kingdom: Animalia
- Phylum: Chordata
- Class: Mammalia
- Order: Cingulata
- Family: Chlamyphoridae
- Subfamily: †Glyptodontinae
- Genus: †Protoglyptodon; Ameghino, 1885

Type species
- †Protoglyptodon primiformis Ameghino, 1885

Species
- P. primiformis Ameghino, 1885; P. sagradoi Calcaterra, 1978; P. sanpedroi Calcaterra, 1978; P. solidus Ameghino, 1891

Extinct genus of mammals

Protoglyptodon is an extinct genus of glyptodont. It lived during the Late Miocene, and its fossilized remains were found in South America.

== Description ==
This animal, like all glyptodonts, had a dorsal armor protecting a large part of the body, consisting of well-fused polygonal osteoderms. The osteoderms were quite similar to those of Palaeohoplophorus, with a medium-sized, depressed central figure, and with wrinkled and irregular peripheral areas. Its carapace appearance was more irregular in Protoglyptodon. Its caudal tube bore osteoderms whose main figures were surrounded by a crown of perforations, but separated by peripheral areas decorated in a very irregular way.

== Classification ==
Protoglyptodon primiformis was first described in 1885 by Florentino Ameghino, based on incomplete fossil remains coming from Late Miocene terrains of Argentina, first erroneously attributed to the Oligocene. Protoglyptodon was a member of the tribe Hoplophorini, a diverse and long-lived group of glyptodonts; Protoglyptodon was closely related to the better known genus Palaehoplophorus.

== Bibliography ==
- F. Ameghino. 1885. Nuevos restos de mamíferos fósiles Oligocenos recogidos por el Profesor Pedro Scalabrini y pertenecientes al Museo Provincial de la ciudad del Parana [New remains of Oligocene fossil mammals collected by Professor Pedro Scalabrini and belonging to the Provincial Museum of the city of Parana]. Boletín de la Academia Nacional de Ciencias 8:1-205
- A. L. Cione, M. M. Azpelicueta, M. Bond, A. A. Carlini, J. R. Casciotta, M. A. Cozzuol, M. Fuente, Z. Gasparini, F. J. Goin, J. Noriega, G. J. Scillato-Yane, L. Soibelzon, E. P. Tonni, D. Verzi, and M. G. Vucetich. 2000. Miocene vertebrates from Entre Rios province, eastern Argentina. Serie Correlacion Geologica 14:191-237
