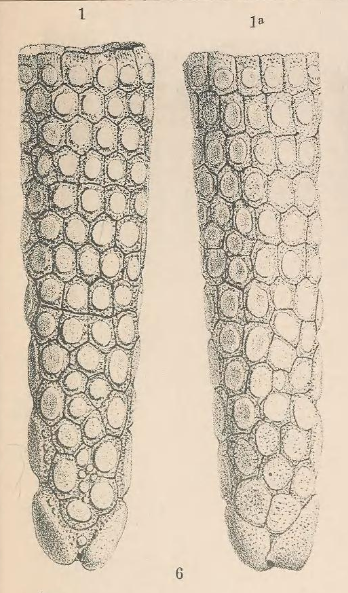
- Lomaphorus imperfectus caudal tube

Scientific classification
- Kingdom: Animalia
- Phylum: Chordata
- Class: Mammalia
- Order: Cingulata
- Family: Chlamyphoridae
- Subfamily: †Glyptodontinae
- Genus: †Lomaphorus; Ameghino, 1889

Type species
- †Hoplophorus imperfectus Gervais and Ameghino, 1880

Other Species
- L. chapalmalensis Ameghino, 1908; L. cingulatus Ameghino, 1889; L. compressus Ameghino, 1882; L. elegans (Burmeister, 1871); L. elevatus (Nodot, 1857)

Synonyms
- Synonyms of L. imperfectus: Hoplophorus imperfectus Gervais and Ameghino, 1880; Synonyms of L. elegans: Hoplophorus elegans Burmeister, 1871; Synonyms of L. elevatus: Glyptodon elevatus Nodot, 1857

= Lomaphorus =

Lomaphorus Temporal range: Late Pleistocene (Lujanian) ~0.1 Ma

Extinct genus of mammals belonging to the armadillo order of xenarthrans

Lomaphorus is a possibly dubious extinct genus of glyptodont that lived during the Pleistocene in eastern Argentina. Although many species have been referred, the genus itself is possibly dubious or synonymous with other glyptodonts like Neoslerocalyptus from the same region.

== Etymology ==
The genus name Lomaphorus is derived from the Greek roots loma- meaning "fringe" and -phorus meaning "bearing" after the striated anatomy of the dermal armor of L. imperfectus. In 1935, a Trematode was named Lomaphorus unwittingly, but it has since been moved to a new genus name, Lomasoma.

== Taxonomy ==
The first fossils referred to Lomaphorus were described as early as 1857 with the description of Glyptodon elevatus based on dorsal carapace osteoderms recovered from Pleistocene deposits in Argentina, but majority of the fossils were described by Argentine paleontologist Florentino Ameghino during the late 19th century. Several more species were referred to the genus that later were synonymized with more complete species or their own genera, Ameghino even admitting that many of his species were diagnosed based on very fine details that could be individual variation. Many species have been named as or referred to Lomaphorus, but most of these referrals or descriptions were erroneously based on taphonomic characteristics of fossilized osteoderms instead of genuine diagnostic features. Few species have received detailed descriptions either, further complicating the situation.

=== Species ===
Type:

- Lomaphorus (Hoplophorus) imperfectus (Gervais & Ameghino, 1880); Undesignated holotype, but Ameghino illustrated some material that may be the holotype that shows many similarities to Neosclerocalyptus. Possibly synonymous with N. pseudornatus or N. ornatus, but further analysis is necessary.

Species referred to Lomaphorus according to Zurita et al (2016):

- Lomaphorus chapalmalensis Ameghino, 1908; Holotype is a distal fragment of a caudal tube (MACN Pv 5806). The morphology of the tube is indistinguishable from that of fossils of Eosclerocalyptus and also juveniles of Neoslerocalyptus, making it a nomen dubium.
- Lomaphorus cingulatus Ameghino, 1889; Holotype is a single dorsal carapace osteoderm that has been lost, though a calcotype (MACN A-592) was created. This calcotype is indistinguishable from other Lomaphorus species', making it a nomen dubium. It could also be a synonym of Trachycalyptus.
- Lomaphorus (Hoplophorus) compressus Ameghino, 1882; Holotype is dorsal carapace osteoderms. The osteoderms' supposed diagnostic traits are the same as those in Neoslerocalyptus species, making it a nomen dubium.
- Lomaphorus (Hoplophorus) elegans (Burmeister, 1871); Holotype includes dorsal carapace osteoderms, though many fossils have been referred to the species.
- Lomaphorus (Glyptodon) elevatus (Nodot, 1857); Holotype is dorsal carapace osteoderms. The osteoderms' supposed diagnostic traits are the same as those in juveniles of Neoslerocalyptus species, making it a nomen dubium.

Other species referred to Lomaphorus:

- Lomaphorus (Hoplophorus) clarazianus (Ameghino, 1889); Holotype is fragmentary osteoderms and a referred skull, though the skull is lost and has been referred to Neoslerocalyptus. The type osteoderms lack diagnostic traits, making it a nomen dubium.
- Lomaphorus (Glyptodon) gracilis (Nodot, 1857); Holotype is fragmentary osteoderms from Brazil. The species was referred to Lomaphorus by Lydekker (1894).
- Lomaphorus (Zaphilus) larranagai (Ameghino, 1889); Holotype is dorsal carapace osteoderms (MACN 1233). The species was referred to Lomaphorus by Lydekker (1894), but has since been declared a nomen dubium and placed back in Zaphilus.
- Lomaphorus (Hoplophorus) lydekkeri (Ameghino, 1889); Holotype is a distal caudal tube fragment (BMNH 40664). The species has since been placed in its own genus, Uruguayurus.
- Lomaphorus (Hoplophorus) "meyeri" (Lund, 1843); A nomen nudum, referred to Lomaphorus by Lydekker (1894).
- Lomaphorus (Plohophorus) orientalis (Ameghino, 1889); Holotype is a caudal tube fragment (MACN-A ?). The species was referred to Lomaphorus by Lydekker (1894), but has since been placed in Pseudoplohophorus.
- Lomaphorus (Hoplophorus) paranensis (Ameghino, 1883); Holotype is a breastplate fragment (MACN ?). The species was referred to Lomaphorus by Lydekker (1894), but has since been declared a nomen dubium and placed in Neoslerocalyptus.
- Lomaphorus (Hoplophorus) pseudornatus (Ameghino, 1889); Holotype is dorsal carapace osteoderms (MACN 1233). The species was referred to Lomaphorus by Lydekker (1894), but has since been placed in Neoslerocalyptus.
- Lomaphorus? (Hoplophorus) scrobiculatus Ameghino, 1889; Holotype is a dorsal carapace and caudal tube apparently in the collections of the MACN. The carapace was said by Ameghino (1895) to be from Lomaphorus compressus and the caudal tube to Neoslcerocalyptus, but it has since been declared a species inquirenda.

== Description ==
Due to problems with the diagnostics of Lomaphorus and its problems with its internal taxonomy, many of the diagnostic traits for the taxon are uncertain. Lomaphorus, like most of the glyptodons, was large at 2.5 meters long but not as large as its relative Hoplophorus. Lomaphorus possessed a powerful carapace that covered a large part of the body, formed by osteoderms melted together. The carapace was relatively low and long, but not as much as that of the Neosclerocalyptus. The dorsal plates brought a central figure of medium size, surrounded by a peripheral area of radial ornamentation. The tail was protected thanks to a series of bone rings and a terminal bone tube; The latter still retained a narrow peripheral band, and was equipped with large side osteoderms. At the end of the tube there were two great convex osteoderms.
