= Urotherium =

Urotherium Temporal range: Late Miocene-Late Pliocene ~8–3 Ma

Scientific classification
- Kingdom: Animalia
- Phylum: Chordata
- Class: Mammalia
- Order: Cingulata
- Family: Chlamyphoridae
- Subfamily: †Glyptodontinae
- Genus: †Urotherium; Castellanos, 1926

Type species
- Urotherium simplex Castellanos, 1926

Species
- U. interundatum Ameghino, 1885; U. simile Castellanos, 1948; U. simplex Castellanos, 1926

Synonyms
- Palaehoplophorus chapalmalensis Ameghino, 1908

Extinct genus of mammals

Urotherium is a dubious extinct genus of Glyptodont. It lived from the Late Miocene to the Late Pliocene, and its fossilized remains were found in South America.

== Description ==
This animal, like all glyptodonts, had a strong dorsal armor composed of numerous osteoderms fused together. The genus was characterized by an almost cylindrical caudal tube, obtuse and covered of small and raised osteoderms separated by wide and deep furrows. A pair of lateral osteoderms was preceded by other poorly differentiated osteoderms. The osteoderms of the carapace resembled those of the genus Trachycalyptus, remarkably wrinkled and strongly punctuated, with a barely distinct central figure, less dotted than the peripheral area. Compared to Trachycalyptus, the osteoderms of Urotherium were thicker and more rounded. In the species Urotherium simile, the osteoderms had lost their sutures and resembled those of Glyptodon.

== Classification ==
The genus Urotherium was first described in 1926 by Castellanos, based on fossil remains found in Argentina found in Late Miocene-Early Pliocene terrains. The type species is Urotherium simplex; another species, U. simile, was described in 1948 by Castellanos, and U. simile was later ascribed to the genus, having originally been described by Florentino Ameghino as belonging to another genus of glyptodont. The status of U. antiquus, another species, is disputed between the genera Neuryurus and Plohophorus.

Urotherium was a genus of glyptodont of uncertain affinities, variously placed within the tribes Neuryurini, Hoplophorini and Lomaphorini. It may have been the sister taxon of the genus Neuryurus.

== Bibliography ==
- Castellanos A. 1926. Sobre un nuevo gliptodóntido chapadmalense. Urotherium simplex n. gen. n. sp. y las formas afines. An Mus Nac Hist Nat Buenos Aires 60: 263-278.
- Castellanos A. 1948. La presencia del género "Urotherium" en el "Araucanense" del Valle del Yocavil (Santa María), provincias de Catamarca y Tucumán. Pub Inst Fisiogr Geol 35: 1-16.
- Zurita, A.E., Taglioretti, M., De los Reyes, Martin., Cuadrelli, F., and Poire, D. 2016. Regarding the real diversity of Glyptodontidae (Mammalia, Xenarthra) in the late Pliocene (Chapadmalalan Age/Stage) of Argentina. Anais da Academia Brasileira de Ciências, 88:809-821.
