= Neoglyptatelus =

Neoglyptatelus Temporal range: Middle-Late Miocene ~13–7 Ma

Scientific classification
- Kingdom: Animalia
- Phylum: Chordata
- Class: Mammalia
- Order: Cingulata
- Family: †Pachyarmatheriidae
- Genus: †Neoglyptatelus; Carlini et al, 1997

Type species
- †Neoglyptatelus originalis Carlini et al, 1997

Species
- N. originalis Carlini et al 1997; N. sincelejanus Villarroel & Clavijo 2005; N. uruguayensis Fernicola et al 2018

Extinct genus of mammals

Neoglyptatelus is an extinct genus of xenarthran, belonging to the order Cingulata. It lived from the Middle to the Late Miocene, and its fossilized remains are found in South America.

== Description ==
This animal was roughly similar with modern armadillos, but with a very different carapace morphology. The size of Neoglyptatelus was situated between the size of a greater long-nosed armadillo and that of a giant armadillo; the type species, Neoglyptatelus originalis, reached a length of 60 centimeters, excluding the tail, and a weight around 15 kilograms.

Its carapace was divided into two separate shields, one scapular and the other pelvic, composed of numerous polygonal osteoderms 1 centimeter thick and 1.5 centimeters long, and fused together to form a rigid structure; the posterior margin of the scapular shield, which reached about half the total length of the body, consisted of two rows of wedge-shaped, imbricated osteoderms, covering the anterior margin of the pelvic shield. 'Neoglyptatelus was hence equipped with a shield rigid in most of its structure, but flexible in the middle of the back. This is a unique structure for a cingulate, the glyptodonts only having a completely rigid structure formed by fixed osteoderms, and the modern armadillos having several mobile bands in the middle of their backs.

The skull of Neoglyptatelus was long and thin, and devoid of teeth. The caudal armor was also composed of osteoderms placed side by side.

== Classification ==
The genus Neoglyptatelus was first described in 1997, based on fossil remains found in Miocene terrains of Colombia; the type species is Neoglyptatelus originalis. Two other species, N. sincelejanus from the Middle-Late Miocene of Colombia, and N. uruguayensis, from the Late Miocene of Uruguay, have been attributed to the genus. Neoglyptatelus is an enigmatic member of the order Cingulata; at the time of its discovery it was considered a basal member of the subfamily Glyptodontinae, related to archaic forms such as Glyptatelus and surviving in remote areas of northern South America in isolation. Subsequent studies indicates that this animal, like its more recent relative Pachyarmatherium, was a member of the clade known as Pachyarmatheriidae, potentially and at least morphologically intermediate between "true" armadillos and glyptodonts.

== Paleobiogeography ==
The peculiar geographical distribution of Neoglyptatelus and Pachyarmatherium led researchers to suppose that these animals, originating in South America during the Oligocene or the Early Miocene, migrated to North America during the Great American Faunal Interchange, during the Pliocene.

== Paleobiology ==
Neoglyptatelus, with its long and narrow skull devoid of teeth, probably was an insectivorous animal. It probably fed on ants, like the extant nine-banded armadillo, which has a quite similar skull.

== Bibliography ==
- Carlini, A. A., Vizcaíno, S. F. & Scillato-Yané, G. J. 1997. Armored Xenarthrans: a unique taxonomic and ecologic assemblage. In Kay, R. F., Madden, R. H., Cifelli, R. L. & Flynn, J. J. (Edits.). Vertebrate Paleontology in the Neotropics. The Miocene Fauna of La Venta, Colombia. Smithsonian Institution Press. Pp. 213–226.
- Villarroel A., C. & J. Clavijo. Los mamíferos fósiles y las edades de las sedimentitas continentales del Neógeno de la Costa Caribe Colombiana. Revista de la Academia Colombiana de Ciencias. 29 (112): 345-356. 2005.
- Fernicola, J. C.; Rinderknecht, A.; Jones, W.; Vizcaíno, S. F.; Porpino, K. (2018). "A New Species of Neoglyptatelus (Mammalia, Xenarthra, Cingulata) from the Late Miocene of Uruguay Provides New Insights on the Evolution of the Dorsal Armor in Cingulates". Ameghiniana. 55 (3): 233–252. doi:10.5710/AMGH.02.12.2017.3150.
