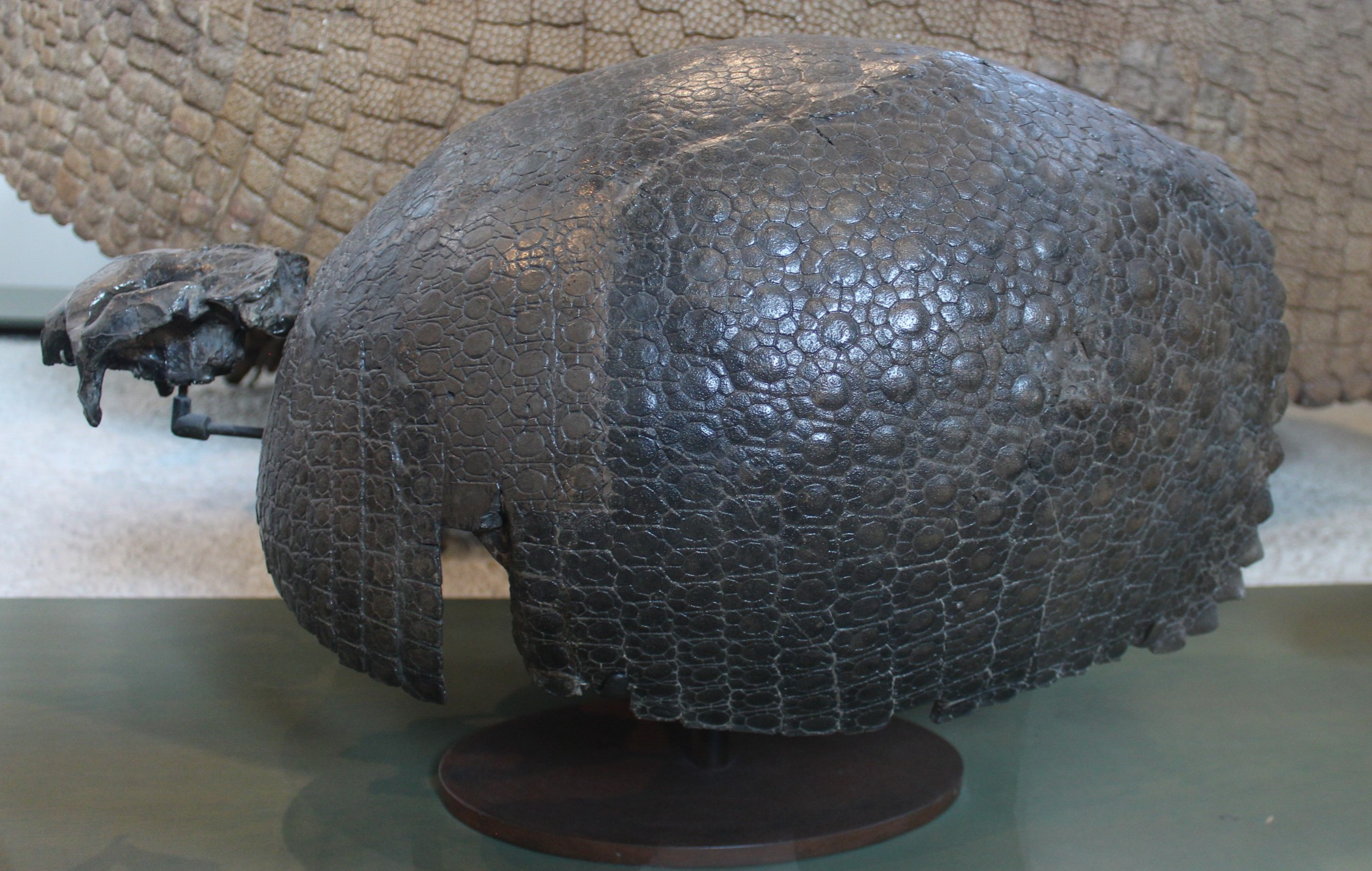
- Propalaeohoplophorus minor

Scientific classification
- Kingdom: Animalia
- Phylum: Chordata
- Class: Mammalia
- Order: Cingulata
- Family: Chlamyphoridae
- Subfamily: †Glyptodontinae
- Genus: †Propalaehoplophorus; Ameghino 1887

Species
- P. australis Ameghino 1887; P. minus Ameghino 1891

Synonyms
- Propalaeohoplophorus

= Propalaehoplophorus =

Propalaehoplophorus Temporal range: Early Miocene (Santacrucian-Friasian) ~17.5–15.5 Ma

Extinct genus of mammals

Propalaehoplophorus, also written as Propalaeohoplophorus, is an extinct genus of glyptodont, which lived in South America during the Early Miocene epoch.

== Description ==
This animal was to be very similar to the subsequent glyptodonts of the Pliocene and Pleistocene, such as Glyptodon and Panochthus, but was much smaller. The total body length of the animal was just under a meter, and the highest point of the carapace was around 50 centimeters high.

=== Carapace ===
The dorsal armor was made up of transversal plaques files but were still present, along the lateral and front margins, two or three rows of osteoderms that indicate slight flexibility. The ornamentation of the plates consisted in a large central -oval figure, surrounded by a row of polygonal peripheral figures. The carapace was short and convex, with 19–20 transverse osteoderms on the midline, which became 27 on the side edges due to two bifurcations. The plates are equipped with clear but shallow furrows, and the central figures are generally flat, even if slightly swollen in the back. Small hair piles were present, located in the points of origin of the radial furrows. The tail was protected by five or six mobile rings, followed by a solid bone tube, probably corresponding to four rings welded together; the tube stopped abruptly, and was closed posteriorly by an irregular plate.

=== Skull ===
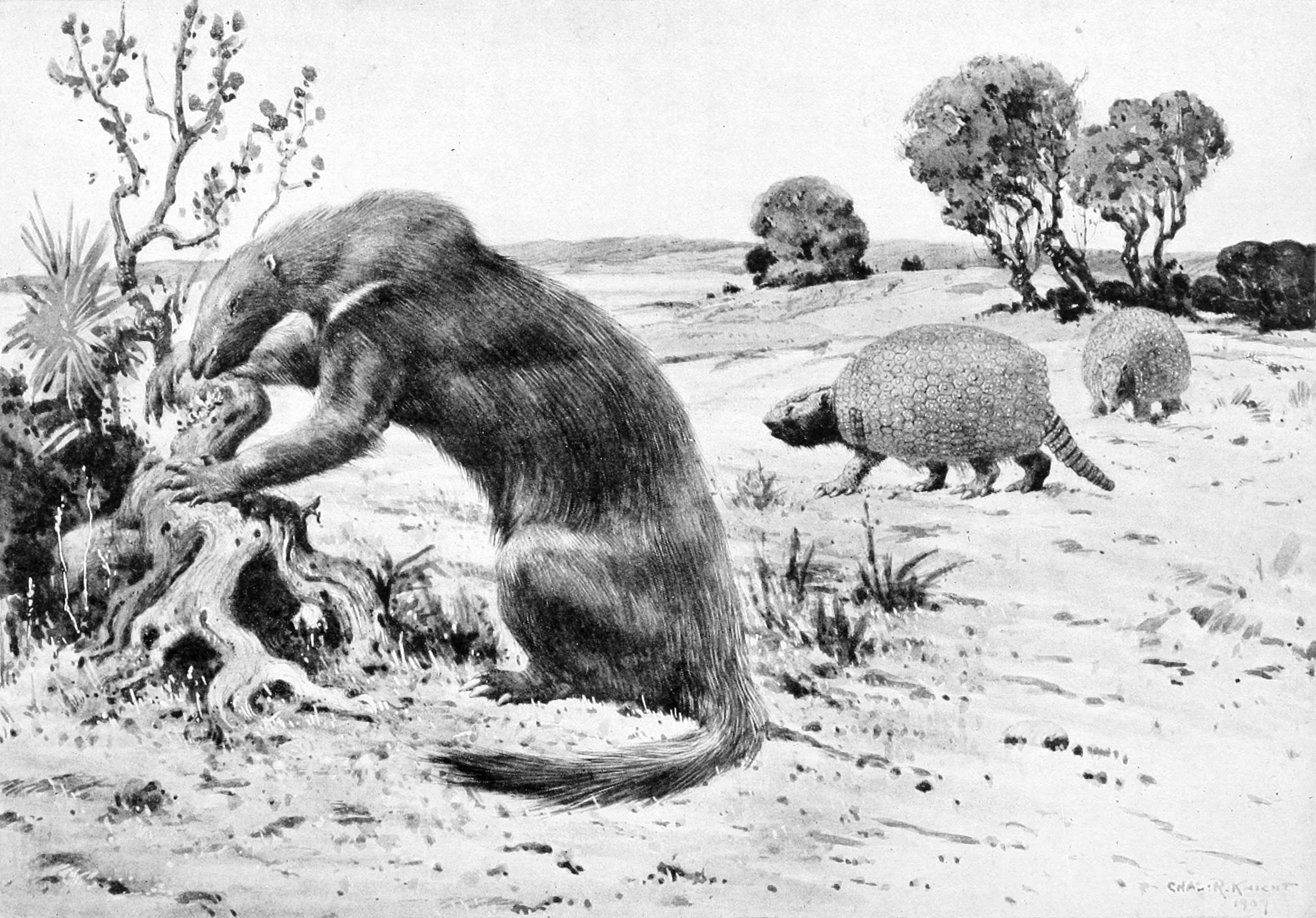
Restoration of two P. australis and Hapalops, by Charles R. Knight.

The skull was narrow, but already equipped with the characteristic bone processes descending below the orbit area, typical of the glyptodonts. There was a cephalic shield consisting of 28–29 irregular plates, all separated from each other, by the ornamentation that recalled that of the carapace but less marked. The teeth were not as hypsodont as those of subsequent glyptodonts, and their shape was less symmetrical: the lobes were more enlarged in the outside. The front teeth were still simple. It has been observed in some specimens that two or three dimples were present on the premaxilla and in the front of the jaw, perhaps corresponding to rudimentary incisors fall. The muzzle was still relatively elongated, and the sagittal and occipital ridge were clear. Cranium and carapace of Propalaehoplophorus minor the spine, on the other hand, had already acquired the arched shape and the degree of vertebral fusion typical of the most recent glyptodonts. The rear legs were much longer than the front ones, and the femur was similar to that of the wardrobe, long and relatively slender. The foot was pentadactyl and equipped with toes and large fingers, similar to those of Neosclerocalyptus. The scapula was still relatively high and narrow, while the humerus was like that of armadillos, and had a well-developed deltoid ridge, as well as that for the humerus, and a large foramina. The hand was equipped with pointed claws.

== Classification ==
The genus Propalaehoplophorus was described for the first time by Florentino Ameghino in 1887, on the basis of fossil remains found in lower Miocene strata in Argentina; type species is P. australis, which is known from several deposits in Argentina. Another well known species is P. minor, which is also from Argentina. Propalaehoplophorus is the best known member of the Propalaehoplophorini, the group including the oldest definitively known glyptodonts, whose skeleton still preserve more armadillo-like characteristics. Propalaehoplophorus is the eponymous genus of this group and draws its name from the genus Palaehoplophorus, which in turn derives from Hoplophorus, another genus of glyptodont, but it is known from the Pleistocene of Brazil.

Modern cladistic analysis suggests that Propalaehoplophorus is the most basal member of the "Austral clade", more closely related to glyptodonts with fused caudal tube tails like Doedicurus than to Glyptodon.Cladogram after Barasoain et al. 2022:

- Glyptodonts
  - Traditional Glyptodontinae
    - Boreostemma
    - - Glyptotherium
      - Glyptodon
  - "Austral clade"
    - Propalaehoplophorus
    - - Eucinepeltus
      - - Cochlops
        - Palaehoplophorus
        - - Kelenkura
          - - Eosclerocalyptus
            - - - - Plohophorus
                  - Pseudohoplophorus
                - Doedicurinae
                  - Doedicurus
                  - Eleutherocercus
              - - Neosclerocalyptus
                - Hoplophorini
                  - Hoplophorus
                  - - Propanochthus
                    - Panochthus

== Distribution ==
Fossils of Propalaehoplophorus have been found in the Santa Cruz and Sarmiento Formations of Argentina, the Honda Group and Nazareno Formation of Bolivia and the Río Frías Formation of Chile.

== Bibliography ==
- F. Ameghino. 1891. Nuevos restos de mamíferos fósiles descubiertos por Carlos Ameghino en el Eoceno inferior de la Patagonia austral. – Especies nuevas, adiciones y correcciones [New remains of fossil mammals discovered by Carlos Ameghino in the lower Eocene of southern Patagonia. – New species, additions, and corrections]. Revista Argentina de Historia Natural 1:289-328
- F. Ameghino. 1894. Enumeration synoptique des especes de mammifères fossiles des formations éocènes de Patagonie. Boletin de la Academia Nacional de Ciencias en Cordoba (Republica Argentina) 13:259-452
- R. Lydekker. 1894. Contributions to a knowledge of the Fossil Vertebrates of Argentina. Part II. 2. The extinct edentates of Argentina. Anales del Museo de La Plata. Paleontología Argentina 3:1-118
- Vizcaíno, S. F.; Blanco, R. E.; Bender, J. B. N.; Milne, N. (2011). "Proportions and function of the limbs of glyptodonts". Lethaia. 44: 93. doi:10.1111/j.1502-3931.2010.00228.x
