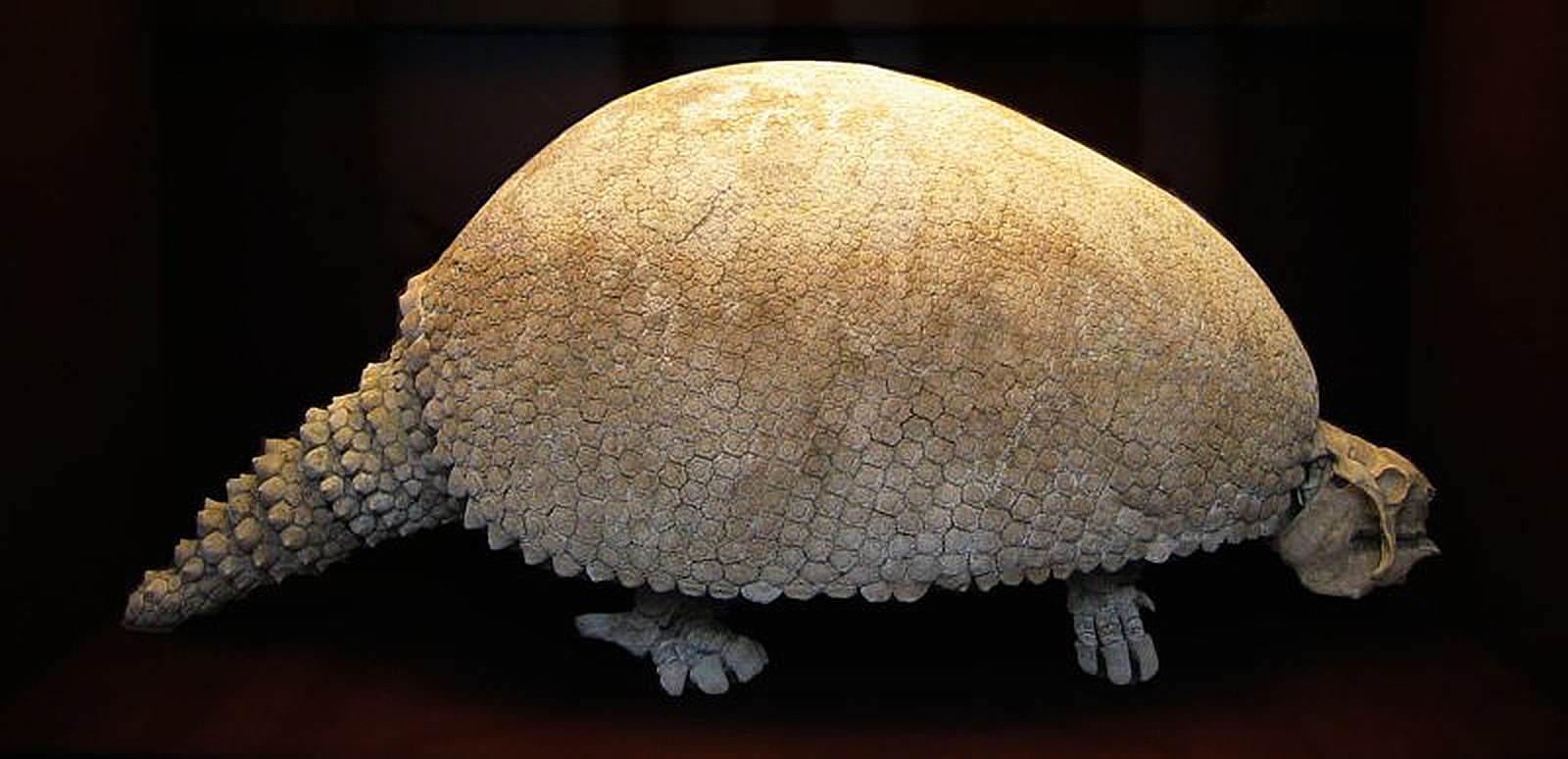
- Glyptodon fossil, Natural History Museum, Vienna
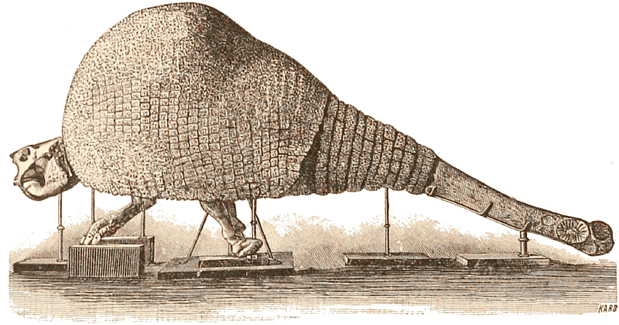
- Illustration of the skeleton of Doedicurus

Scientific classification
- Kingdom: Animalia
- Phylum: Chordata
- Class: Mammalia
- Order: Cingulata
- Family: Chlamyphoridae
- Subfamily: †Glyptodontinae; Burmeister 1879

Genera
- †Andinoglyptodon; †Asterostemma; †Boreostemma; †Clypeotherium; †Cochlops; †Coscinocercus; †Cranithlastus; †Doedicurus; †Eleutherocercus; †Eonaucum; †Eosclerocalyptus; †Eucinepeltus; †Glyptatelus; †Glyptodon; †Glyptotherium; †Hoplophorus; †Kelenkura; †Neosclerocalyptus; †Neuryurus; †Nopachtus; †Palaehoplophoroides; †Palaehoplophorus; †Panochthus; †Paraeucinepeltus; †Parahoplophorus; †Parapropalaehoplophorus; †Peiranoa; †Phlyctaenopyga; †Plohophoroides; †Plohophorus; †Propalaehoplophorus; †Propanochthus; †Protoglyptodon; †Pseudoeuryurus; †Pseudoneothoracophorus; †Pseudoplohophorus; †Stromaphorus; †Trachycalyptoides; †Uruguayurus; Nomina dubia: †Aspidocalyptus; †Castellanosia; †Comaphorus; †Daedicuroides; †Glyptodontidium; †Lomaphorelus; †Lomaphorops; †Lomaphorus; †Metopotoxus; †Plaxhaplous; †Prodaedicurus; †Palaeodaedicurus; †Parapanochthus; †Trachycalyptus; †Urotherium; †Xiphuroides; †Zaphilus

= Glyptodont =

Glyptodonts Temporal range: Eocene–Late Pleistocene (Divisaderan–Lujanian) ~38–0.011 Ma

Subfamily of extinct mammals belonging to the armadillo order of xenarthrans

Glyptodonts are an extinct clade of large, heavily armored armadillos, reaching up to 1.5 metres (4.9 ft) in height, and maximum body masses of around 2 tonnes. They had short, deep skulls, a fused vertebral column, and a large bony carapace made up of hundreds of individual scutes. Some glyptodonts had clubbed tails, similar to ankylosaurid dinosaurs.

The earliest widely recognised fossils of glyptodonts in South America are known from the late Eocene, around 38 million years ago, and they spread to southern North America after the continents became connected around 2.7 million years ago. The best-known genus within the group is Glyptodon.

Glyptodonts were historically considered to constitute the distinct family Glyptodontidae, with their relationships to modern armadillos being contested. In 2016, an analysis of the mitochondrial genome of Doedicurus found that it was, in fact, nested within the modern armadillos as the sister group of a clade consisting of Chlamyphorinae (fairy armadillos) and Tolypeutinae (giant, three-banded and naked-tailed armadillos). For this reason, glyptodonts and all armadillos but Dasypus (long-nosed or naked-tailed armadillos) were relocated to a new family, Chlamyphoridae, and glyptodonts were demoted to the subfamily Glyptodontinae. Other authors have continued to use Glyptodontidae. Based on the morphology of the inner ear, a close relationship with pampatheres has also been proposed.

Glyptodonts abruptly became extinct approximately 12,000 years ago at the end of the Late Pleistocene, as part of the end-Pleistocene extinction event, along with most other large animals in the Americas. Evidence has been found suggesting that they were hunted by recently arrived Paleoindians, which may have played a role in their extinction.

== Evolution ==
Cladogram of Cingulata based on molecular evidence

- Cingulata
  - Dasypodidae
  - Chlamyphoridae
    - Euphractinae
      - Euphractus
      - - Zaedyus
        - - Chaetophractus villosus
          - - Chaetophractus nationi
            - C. vellerosus
    - - †Glyptodontinae (Doedicurus)
      - - Chlamyphorinae
          - Chlamyphorus
          - Calyptophractus
        - Tolypeutinae
          - Priodontes
          - - Tolypeutes
            - Cabassous

The earliest remains of glyptodonts are known from the late of Eocene in South America, with more complete remains known from the Oligocene and Early Miocene onwards. Genetic evidence indicates that glyptodonts are nested within the diversity of living armadillos, with their distinctive body armour having evolved from the banded armour found in living armadillos. Analysis of inner ear morphology corroborates this position, while also finding that pampatheres are the close relatives of glyptodonts:

- Cingulata
  - Dasypodidae
  - - Euphractinae
    - - Chlamyphorinae
      - Tolypeutinae
      - - †Pampatheres
        - †Glyptodonts

Cladogram after Casali et al. 2026 based on combined morphological and molecular evidence:

- Cingulata
  - - †Palaeopeltis
    - †Peltephilidae
  - Paracingulata
    - Dasypodoidea
      - †Pucatheriidae
      - Dasypodidae (long-nosed/nine banded armadillos)
    - Chlamyphoroidea
      - - †Utaetus
        - †Parutaetus
      - Glytophracta
        - Euphracta
          - Tolypeutidae (incl. giant and three-banded armadillos)
          - - Chlamyphoridae (fairy armadillos)
            - Euphractidae (incl. hairy and six-banded armadillos)
        - †Glyptodonta
          - †Eocoelophorus
          - - †Pampatheriidae
            - - †Glyptatelidae
              - - †Pachyarmatheriidae
                - †Glyptodontidae

Glyptodonts are divided into two major groups, which split during or prior to the Early Miocene. The first is the traditional Glyptodontinae, which is includes the well known genera of Glyptodon and Glyptotherium, which probably originated in Northern South America, while the second is the unnamed "Austral clade", containing the majority of glyptodont diversity, which as the name suggests probably originated in Southern South America.

Cladogram after Barasoain et al. 2022:

- Glyptodonts
  - Traditional Glyptodontinae
    - Boreostemma
    - - Glyptotherium
      - Glyptodon
  - "Austral clade"
    - Propalaehoplophorus
    - - Eucinepeltus
      - - Cochlops
        - Palaehoplophorus
        - - Kelenkura
          - - Eosclerocalyptus
            - - - - Plohophorus
                  - Pseudohoplophorus
                - Doedicurinae
                  - Doedicurus
                  - Eleutherocercus
              - - Neosclerocalyptus
                - Hoplophorini
                  - Hoplophorus
                  - - Propanochthus
                    - Panochthus

After the Isthmus of Panama formed about three million years ago, the genus Glyptotherium spread north as part of the Great American Interchange, as did pampatheres, armadillos and a number of other types of xenarthrans (e.g., ground sloths).

== Description ==
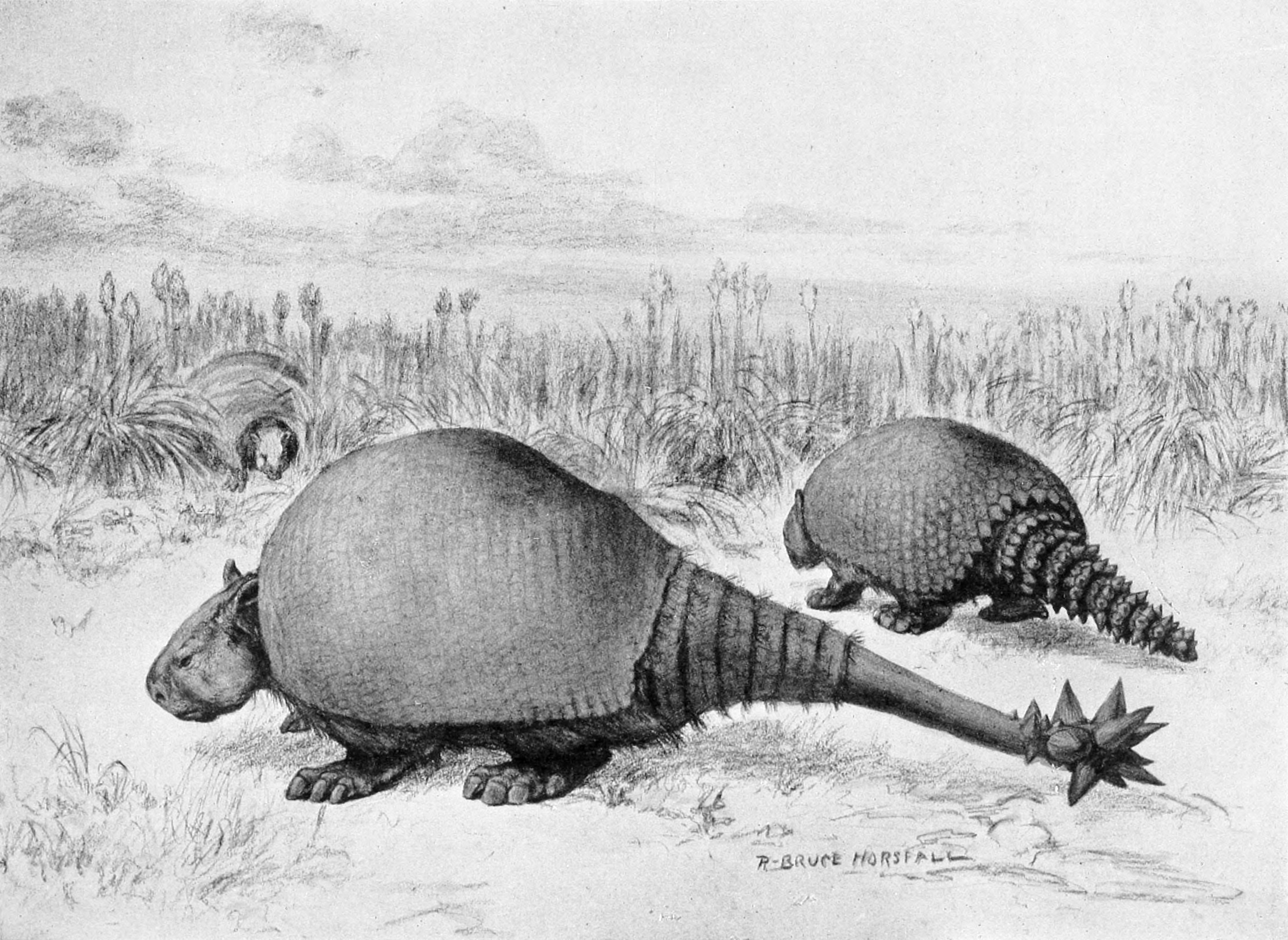
Doedicurus and Glyptodon by Robert Bruce Horsfall

The largest glyptodonts like Doedicurus reached a height of 1.5 metres (4.9 ft) and 4 metres (13 ft) in length, with a body mass of over two tonnes. The body of glyptodonts was covered in a large immobile carapace made up of hundreds of bony scutes/osteoderms, with the underside of the body and the top of the head also being protected with osteoderms. This protection reached a thickness of 2.5 centimetres (0.98 in). The vertebrae of the back were extensively fused to each other. The limbs were short and robustly built, with the pectoral girdle being wide. The head was short and blunt, with deep jaws. The teeth were grooved, and were evergrowing. The tail was covered in rings composed of osteoderms, which allowed the tail to flex. In many glyptodonts (members of the "Austral clade" other than Propalaehoplophorus and Eucinepeltus), the end of the tail was covered in a completely fused "caudal tube". The end of caudal tubes of at least some glyptodonts are covered in depressions which in life are suggested to have been anchoring points for horny, likely keratinous spikes, allowing for the tail to function as an effective weapon when swung. These "tail clubs" are similar in construction to those of ankylosaurid dinosaurs.

== Ecology ==
Glyptodonts are thought to have been herbivores that fed on low lying vegetation, with mixed feeding or grazing based diets. Some glyptodonts were likely selective feeders, while others were likely bulk feeders. Damage to some glyptodont carapaces suggested to be caused by tail club impacts suggests that tail clubs may have been used in combat between glyptodonts, perhaps in sexual contests between males.

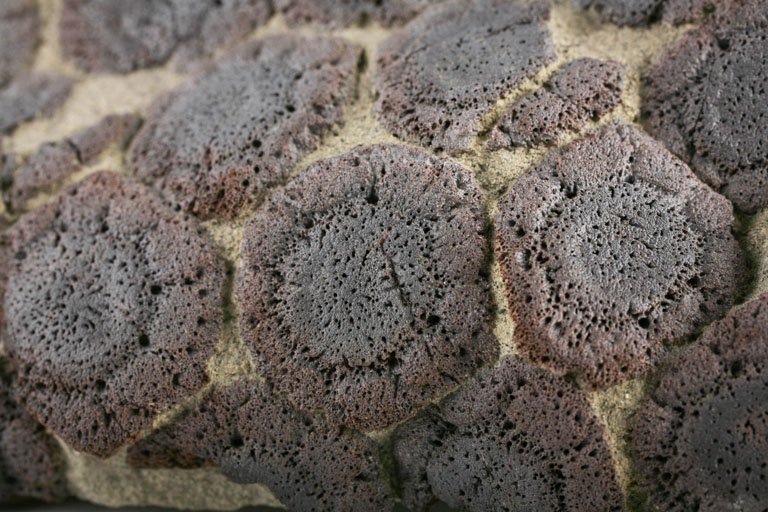
Detail of Propalaehoplophorus scutes, early Miocene, in the permanent collection of The Children's Museum of Indianapolis

== Extinction ==
At the end of the Late Pleistocene, all then-living glyptodont species, which belonged to the genera Glyptodon, Hoplophorus, Glyptotherium, Panochthus, Neuryurus, Doedicurus and Neosclerocalyptus, abruptly became extinct around 12,000 years ago as part of the end-Pleistocene extinction event, simultaneously with the vast majority of other large mammals in the Americas. These extinctions followed the first arrival of humans in the Americas, and the importance of human vs climatic factors in these extinctions has been the subject of contention. Several sites across South America are suggested to document hunting of glyptodonts by the recently arrived Paleoindians, which may have played a role in their extinction. At the Muaco and Taima-Taima sites in Falcón State in northwestern Venezuela, several skulls of Glyptotherium display distinctive fracture marks on the skull roof that occurred around the time of death, suggested to have been caused by a deliberate percussive blow to a relatively thin part of the skull by a club or stone tool.
