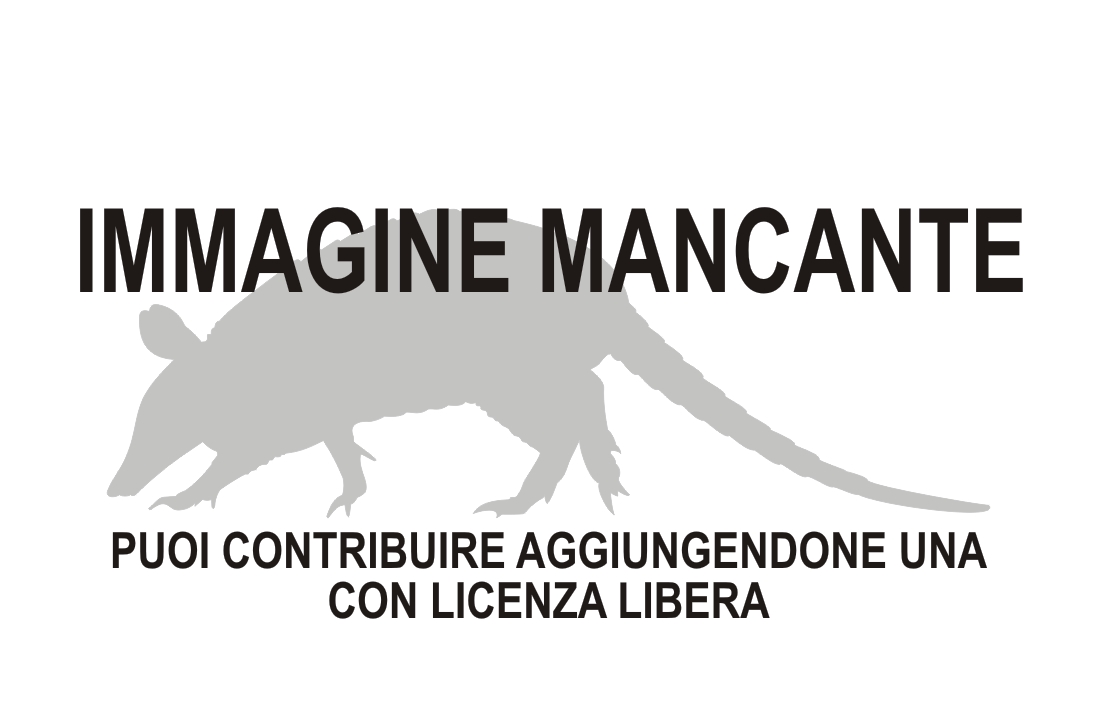

Scientific classification
- Kingdom: Animalia
- Phylum: Chordata
- Class: Mammalia
- Order: Cingulata
- Family: Chlamyphoridae
- Subfamily: †Glyptodontinae
- Genus: †Trachycalyptus; Ameghino, 1908

Type species
- Trachycalyptus chapalmalensis Ameghino, 1908

Species
- T. chapalmalensis Ameghino, 1885; T. cingulatus Ameghino, 1889

= Trachycalyptus =

Trachycalyptus Temporal range: Early Pliocene ~5–4 Ma

Extinct genus of mammals

Trachycalyptus is a dubious extinct genus of glyptodont. It lived during the Early Pliocene, and its fossilized remains were discovered in South America.

== Description ==
Like all glyptodonts, Trachycalyptus had a heavy body protected by a sturdy armor composed of osteoderms fused together. It had wrinkled and strongly punctuated osteoderms; the central figure was mainly distinguished by a lower density of small holes on its surface. The absence of radial groove allows to distinguish it from other genera of glyptodonts. The tail was protected by a caudal tube, characterized by the presence of wrinkled osteoderms with numerous vascular perforations, without differentiation of the peripheral area. There were three pairs of large lateral osteoderms on the tail.

== Classification ==
The genus Trachycalyptus was first described in 1908 by Florentino Ameghino, based on fossil remains found in Pliocene terrains of Argentina. The type species is Trachycalyptus chapalmalensis. A Late Miocene species, Trachycalyptus cingulatus, initially ascribed by Florentino Ameghino to another genus, was later tentatively attributed to this genus, although this attribution is still contested. It was similar to Trachycalyptoides, from the Late Miocene of Bolivia.

Trachycalyptus was a member of the glyptodont Sclerocalyptini; it was originally considered closely related to the genus Urotherium; however, it was recently placed closer to the genera Lomaphorus and Neosclerocalyptus.

== Bibliography ==
- Cruz, L. E. and Fernicola, J. C. 2010. Las especies del género Trachycalyptus Ameghino (Glyptodontia): consideraciones taxonómicas. Jornadas Argentinas de Paleontología de Vertebrados; 2010.
