= Glyptatelus =

Glyptatelus Temporal range: Late Eocene-Middle Oligocene ~34–28 Ma

Scientific classification
- Kingdom: Animalia
- Phylum: Chordata
- Class: Mammalia
- Order: Cingulata
- Family: Chlamyphoridae
- Subfamily: †Glyptodontinae
- Genus: †Glyptatelus; Ameghino, 1897

Type species
- †Glyptatelus tatusinus Ameghino 1897

Species
- G. fractus Ameghino 1902; G. malaspinensis Ameghino 1902; G. tatusinus Ameghino 1897

Extinct genus of mammals

Glyptatelus is an extinct genus of glyptodont. It lived from the Late Eocene to the Middle Oligocene in what is now Argentina and Bolivia.

== Description ==
This genus is only known from very fragmentary remains from its carapace. From a comparison between those fossils and those of its later relatives, it is assumed that Glyptatelus was a rather small glyptodont, with a carapace made of polygonal osteoderms welded together to form a rigid structure. The shape of those osteoderms was hexagonal; they featured a large central figure displaced a bit backwards, from which radial grooves branched off, separating some peripheral polygonal figures. In the older forms attributed to Glyptatelus, the individual osteoderms usually had a diameter of 1.3 millimeters and a height of 9 millimeters, while more recent forms possessed osteoderms with a diameter of 25–30 millimeters and a height of 20 millimeters.

A fragment of mandible attributed to Glyptatelus preserve a tooth divided in three lobes, like those of later glyptodonts; the central lobe, however, was quite small. Instead of forming a relief as in the later forms, the vascular dentin corresponds to a central depression.

== Classification ==
The genus Glyptatelus was first described in 1897 by Florentino Ameghino, based on fossils found in Oligocene terrains from Argentine Patagonia; the type species is Glyptatelus tatusinus, but other species were later ascribed to the genus, such as Glyptatelus fractus, the oldest species, and G. malaspinensis, described by Ameghino himself in 1902.

Glyptatelus is considered to be one of the oldest glyptodonts, and the archaic structure of its osteoderms seems to indicate a position at the base of the group. Its relative Clypeotherium was slightly more recent. Two other, more recent, genera, Neoglyptatelus and Pachyarmatherium, have been considered close to Glyptatelus; subsequent analysis tends to indicate that the latter two genera were in reality part of an entirely different clade of cingulates, the Pachyarmatheriidae.

== Bibliography ==
- F. Ameghino. 1897. Mammiféres crétacés de l’Argentine (Deuxième contribution à la connaissance de la fauna mammalogique de couches à Pyrotherium) [Cretaceous mammals of Argentina (second contribution to the knowledge of the mammalian fauna of the Pyrotherium Beds)]. Boletin Instituto Geografico Argentino 18(4–9):406-521
- F. Ameghino. 1902. Notices préliminaires sur des mammifères nouveaux des terrains Crétacé de Patagonie {preliminary notes on new mammals from the Cretaceous terrains of Patagonia]. Boletin de la Academia Nacional de Ciencias de Córdoba 17:5-70
- G. G. Simpson. 1948. The beginning of the age of mammals in South America. Part I. Bulletin of the American Museum of Natural History 91:1-232
- Fernicola, J. C.; Rinderknecht, A.; Jones, W.; Vizcaíno, S. F.; Porpino, K. (2018). "A New Species of Neoglyptatelus (Mammalia, Xenarthra, Cingulata) from the Late Miocene of Uruguay Provides New Insights on the Evolution of the Dorsal Armor in Cingulates". Ameghiniana. 55 (3): 233–252. doi:10.5710/AMGH.02.12.2017.3150.
