= Asterostemma depressa =

Asterostemma depressa Temporal range: Middle Miocene ~16–12 Ma

Scientific classification
- Kingdom: Animalia
- Phylum: Chordata
- Class: Mammalia
- Infraclass: Placentalia
- Order: Cingulata
- Family: Chlamyphoridae
- Subfamily: †Glyptodontinae
- Genus: †Asterostemma; Ameghino, 1889
- Species: †A. depressa

Binomial name
- †Asterostemma depressa Ameghino, 1889

Extinct genus of mammals

Asterostemma is an extinct genus of glyptodont. It lived during the Middle Miocene, and its fossilized remains were discovered in South America.

== Description ==
Like all its close relatives, Asterostemma had a carapace made of fused osteoderms, protecting most of its body. The ornamentation of its osteoderms was similar to other basal genera of glyptodonts, such as Propalaehoplophorus, with clear and shallow furrows, and the central figures were rounded. Those were surrounded by a single row of peripheral figures. The caudal cuirass of Asterostemma was formed by rings and a caudal tube, forming a long and thin structure, similar to those of modern armadillos.

== Classification ==
Asterostemma depressa was first described by Florentino Ameghino in 1889, based on fossil remains found in Middle Miocene terrains of Argentina. Other species attributed to this genus, such as A. acostae, A. gigantea, and A. venezolensis; subsequent revisions of the fossil remains determined that the latter species belonged to a distinct genus of glyptodont, Boreostemma.

== Bibliography ==
- F. Ameghino. 1889. Contribución al conocimiento de los mamíferos fósiles de la República Argentina [Contribution to the knowledge of the fossil mammals of the Argentine Republic]. Actas de la Academia Nacional de Ciencias de la República Argentina en Córdoba 6:xxxii-1027
- A. A. Carlini, A. E. Zurita, G. J. Scillato-Yane, R. Sanchez, and O. A. Aguilera. 2008. New Glyptodont from the Codore Formation (Pliocene), Falcon State, Venezuela, its relationship with the Asterostemma problem, and the paleobiogeography of the Glyptodontinae. Palaontologische Zeitschrift 82(2):139-152
