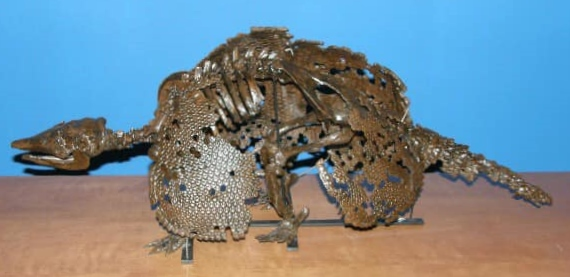
- Mounted skeleton

Scientific classification
- Kingdom: Animalia
- Phylum: Chordata
- Class: Mammalia
- Order: Cingulata
- Family: †Pachyarmatheriidae
- Genus: †Pachyarmatherium; Downing & White, 1995

Species
- † P. leiseyi Downing & White, 1995 † P. tenebris Rincon and White, 2007 † P. brasiliense de O. Porpino et al., 2009

= Pachyarmatherium =

Pachyarmatherium Temporal range: Late Pliocene (Blancan)-Late Pleistocene (Lujanian) ~4.9–0.011 Ma

Extinct genus of cingulate mammals

Pachyarmatherium is a genus of extinct large armadillo-like cingulates found in North and South America from the Pliocene and Pleistocene epochs, related to the extant armadillos and the extinct pampatheres and glyptodonts. It was present from 4.9 Mya to 11,000 years ago, existing for approximately 4.889 million years.

== Taxonomy ==
Pachyarmatherium was named by Downing and White (1995). Its type is P. leiseyi. It was assigned to Dasypodoidea by Downing and White (1995), and tentatively to Glyptodontidae by McKenna and Bell (1997). A cladistic analysis performed by de O. Porpino et al. (2009) led to the conclusion that Pachyarmatherium is a sister group to a clade consisting of Glyptodontidae and Pampatheriidae. Oliveira et al. (2013) suggest that Pachyarmatherium is a possible dasypodid.

== Fossil distribution of Pachyarmatherium ==
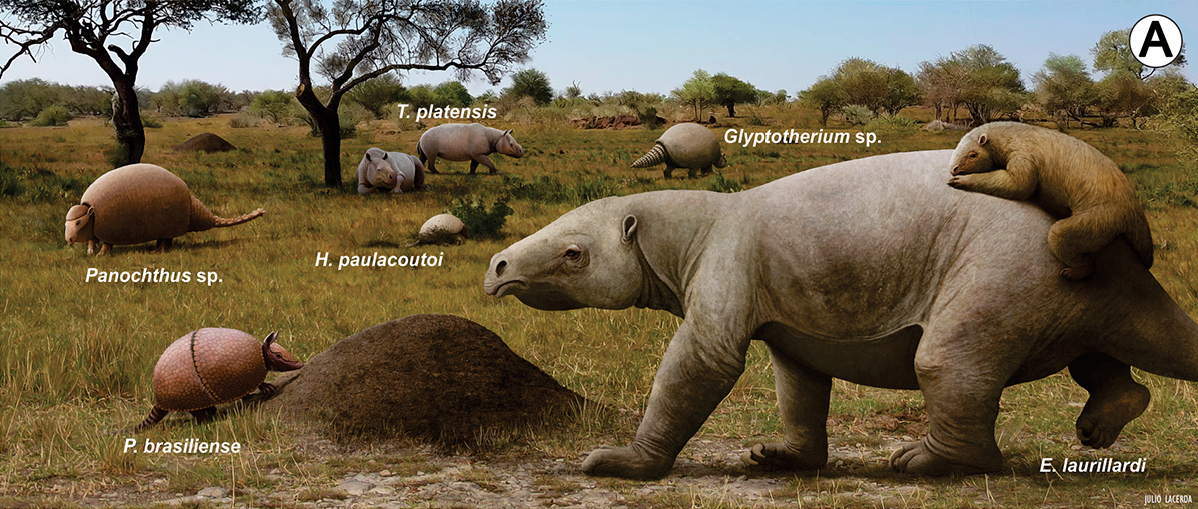
Life restoration of P. brasiliense (lower left) and contemporary animals

=== P. leiseyi ===
- Kissimmee River site, Tamiami Formation, Okeechobee County, Florida ~4.9—1.8 Mya.
- Haile 16A Site, Alachua County, Florida ~1.8 Mya.—300,000 years ago.
- Payne Creek Mine, Polk County, Florida ~1.8 Mya—300,000 years ago.
- Leisey Shell Pit 1A, Bermont Formation, Hillsborough County, Florida ~1.8—300,000 years ago.

=== P. tenebris ===
- Zumbador Cave (= Cueva del Zumbador) - Capadare Formation, Falcón, Venezuela, Pleistocene
- Cueva El Miedo (= Cave Fear), Capadare Formation, Lujanian, Falcón, Venezuela, ~800,000-11,000 BP

=== P. brasiliense ===
Lajedo de Escada, Rio Grande do Norte, Brazil, Late Pleistocene, 100,000 years BP
