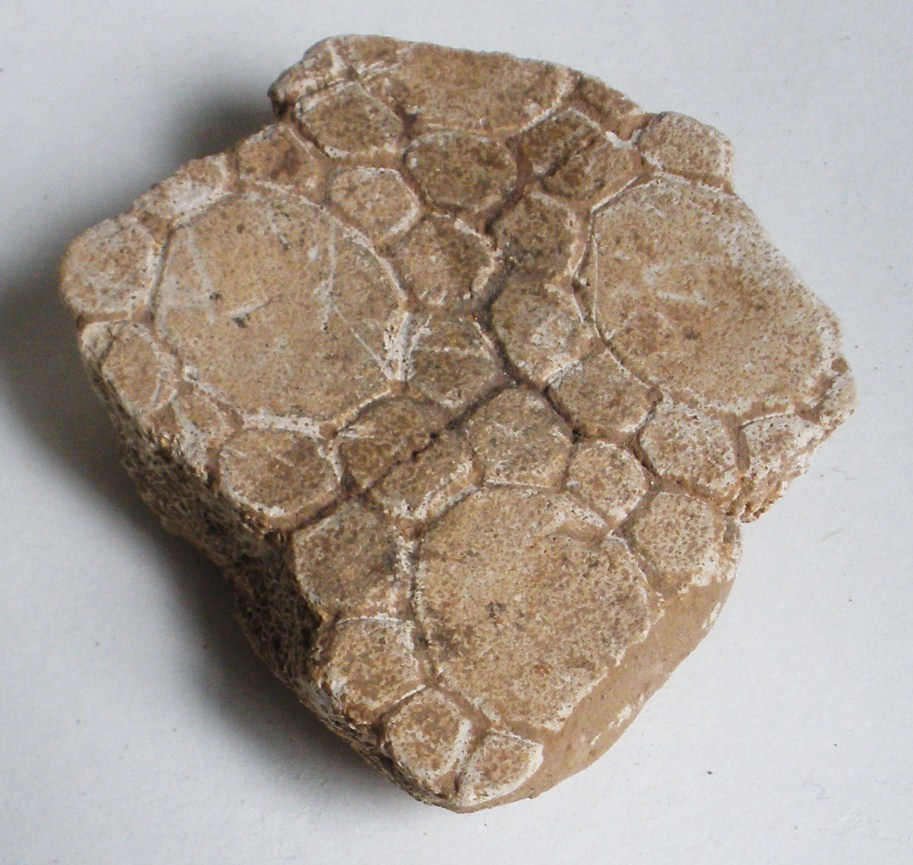
- Shell fragment

Scientific classification
- Kingdom: Animalia
- Phylum: Chordata
- Class: Mammalia
- Order: Cingulata
- Family: Chlamyphoridae
- Subfamily: †Glyptodontinae
- Genus: †Hoplophorus; Lund, 1837
- Species: †H. euphractus

Binomial name
- †Hoplophorus euphractus Lund, 1837

= Hoplophorus =

Hoplophorus Temporal range: Late Pleistocene (Ensenadan-Lujanian) ~0.126–0.011 Ma

Extinct genus of mammals

Hoplophorus is an extinct genus of glyptodont, a subfamily of armadillos. The only confidently known species was H. euphractus, found in Pleistocene deposits in Brazil, though fossils possibly from another species are known from Bolivia.

== History and taxonomy ==
Hoplophorus euphractus was first described in 1837 by Danish paleontologist Peter Wilhelm Lund on the basis of fossilized osteoderms and carapace fragments unearthed in the Upper Pleistocene cave deposits in Lagoa Santa, Minas Gérais, Brazil. This was one of the first glyptodonts to be described. Lund attributed many other fossils to the species over several years, including limb bones, teeth, vertebrae, foot remains, and an incomplete skull. Lund later erected 3 more Hoplophorus species based on the fossils from Lago Santa: H. selloi, H. minor, & H. meyeri. All three didn't receive proper descriptions, making them nomen nuda, and many of the fossils used to name them came from Glyptodon, Dayspus, or H. euphractus. In 1845, British paleontologist Sir Richard Owen named a new species of Glyptodon, G. ornatus, based on osteoderms recovered from Ensenadan strata in Buenos Aires Province, Argentina. This species was synonymized with H. euphractus by French paleontologist G. Pouchet in 1866, but later analysis that reversed this synonymy placed G. ornatus in the genus but as a distinct species.

As exploration into Argentine fossil deposits surged in the late 19th and early 20th centuries, paleontologists like Argentine paleontologist Florentino Ameghino assigned dozens of fossils found in Argentina and the Pampas to new species of Hoplophorus, causing further taxonomic confusion. Many of these actually belonged to Neosclerocalyptus, the genus later created for H. ornatus. Believing that the genus name Hoplophorus was preoccupied, in 1891 Ameghino created a new genus name for its species, Sclerocalyptus, but this was unnecessary as following ICZN regulations Hoplophorus is a valid genus name.

More complete fossil discoveries of Hoplophorus were uncovered from Late Pleistocene-Early Holocene carbonate caves of Lapa do Borges in Minas Gerais were described by Carlos de Paula Caulto in 1947 and 1957. These fossils included an individual, associated skeleton with a fragmentary skull, several postcranial elements, a partial carapace, and caudal tube, which further proved the genus' distinction from Pampean glyptodont species described by Ameghino. Tarsal elements and osteoderms were unearthed from the caves of the same age in Gruta do Bau, Minas Gerais. Furthermore, fragmentary fossils from outside of the Brazilian intertropical region in areas like Acre State, Brazil and Bolivia. Another Hoplophorus species, H. echazui, was named by Robert Hoffstetter based on the Bolivian fossils, but its validity is uncertain. Additional Hoplophorus fossils were also found in the Brazilian states of Piauí and Pernambuco. After more recent redescription, however, notable differences with Neosclerocalyptus and some similarities with Panochthus have been found in the holotype of H. euphractus. Hoplophorus is currently considered a typical member of the glyptodonts, very close to the genus Panochthus.

== Description ==
This animal was large: it measured up to 2.8 m in length, weighing one ton, mainly due to the large bony armor that covered the body. As in all glyptodons, this armor was made up of hundreds of osteoderms welded together, and was very little mobile. Hoplophorus must have been very similar to other glyptodons such as Neosclerocalyptus, but unlike this one it had a more globular carapace, formed by plates made wrinkled due to the presence of numerous perforations. Furthermore, the size of Hoplophorus was greater.

The tail was protected by a series of bony rings and by a terminal caudal "tube" made up of numerous osteoderms fused together. This tube differed from that present in other glyptodonts due to the presence of two pairs of large lateral plates, well separated and decorated with a large conical prominence, vaguely similar to that present on the caudal plates of Panochthus. Furthermore, Hoplophorus also resembled the latter due to the presence of an elongated cuboid facet of the navicular.

== Classification ==
Hoplophorus is a member of the glyptodontinae subfamily, a group of extinct, heavily armored armadillos that existed in the Americas during the Cenozoic. Hoplophorus was one of the last glyptodonts to become extinct, with the youngest fossils dating to the early Holocene and few are older than the Pleistocene. Due to the fragmentary nature of the holotype's remains, the phylogenetic position of Hoplophorus has historically been very uncertain. Hoplophorus was first described as a close relative of Glyptodon, then classified in its own family, Hoplophoridae, by Ameghino in 1889. Ameghino believed that Hoplophorus was a descendant of Propalaehoplophorus, Palaehoplophorus, and Plohophorus based on the transition of the osteoderms from large, central nodes into smaller, circular nodes and the transition from long tails with movable rings along their entire length. This supposedly led to the fusion of these rings, creating the tails seen in Doedicurus and Hoplophorus. On the other hand, Castellanos made Hoplophoridae a group within Propalaehoplophoridae, Hoplophoridae including Hoplophorus, Lomaphorus, Plohophorus, Palaehoplophorus, and others. Hoplophorinae (Hoplophorus, Sclerocalyptus, Zaphilus, and Lomaphorus) was said to be descended from Glyptatelines, while Plohoplophorines like Plohophorus were descended from Propalaehoplophorus. The phylogenetic position and makeup of Hoplophorinae and Hoplophorinae would change several times after, many of the Hoplophorids would be reclassified as closer to taxa like Doedicurus, Propalaehoplophorus, or as a more basal Glyptodont. Recently, as more complete remains of glyptodonts and reanalysis of older fossils, phylogenetic analyses have been recovering Hoplophorus and Panochthus as sister taxa in a more truncated Hoplophorini compared to older hypotheses.

The following phylogenetic analysis was conducted by Quiñones et al (2020):

- Glyptodontidae
  - Propalaehoplophorus
  - - Glyptodontinae
      - Boreostemma
      - - Glyptotherium
        - Glyptodon reticulatus
    - - - Plohophorus
        - - Doedicurinae
            - Doedicurus
            - Eleutherocercus
        - - Eosclerocalyptus
          - - Hoplophorini
              - Hoplophorus
              - - Panochthus tuberculatus
                - Panochthus intermedius
            - Neosclerocalyptini
              - Neosclerocalyptus
