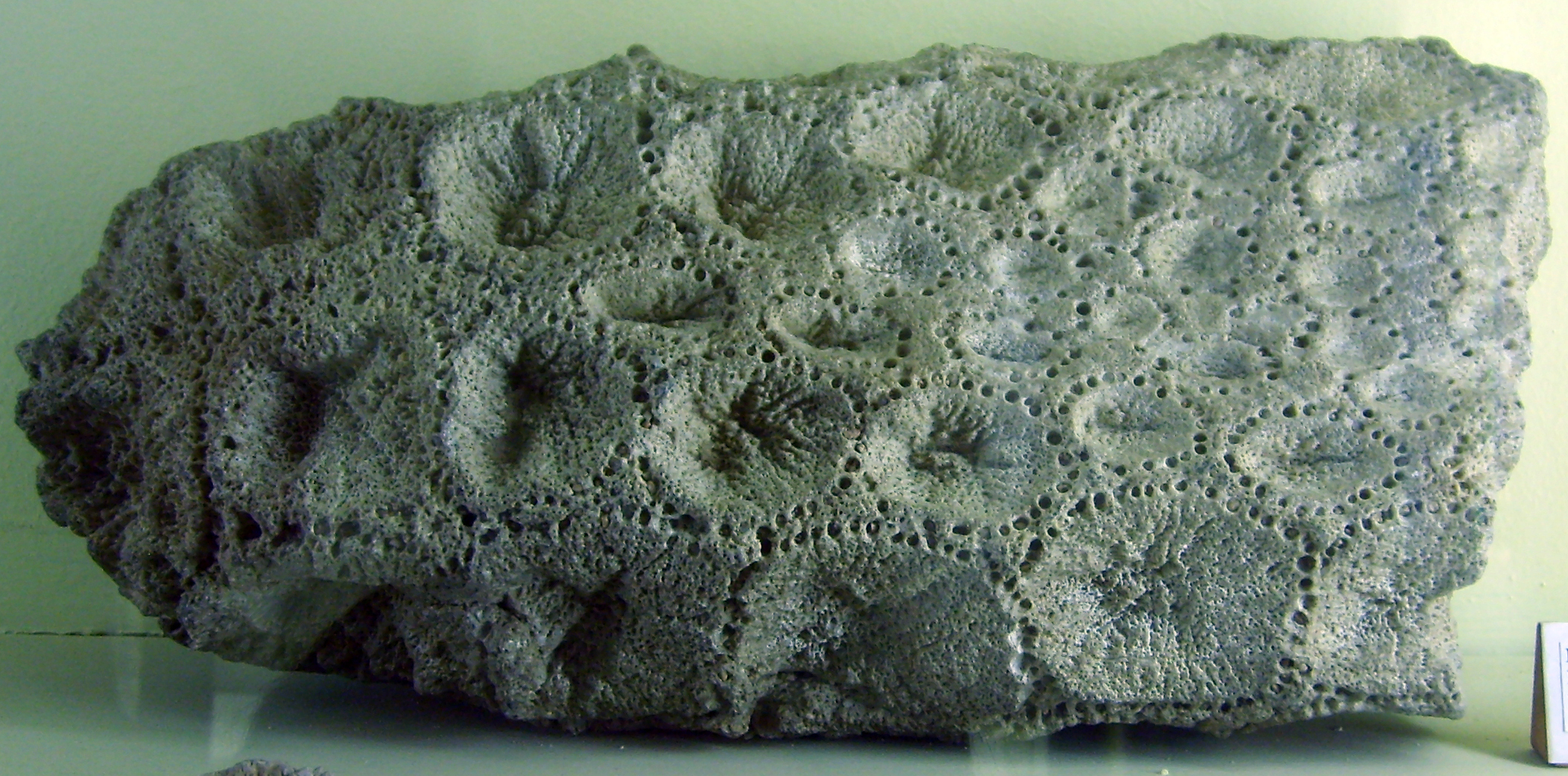
- Eleutherocercus setifer tail armour at the Museum für Naturkunde, Berlin

Scientific classification
- Kingdom: Animalia
- Phylum: Chordata
- Class: Mammalia
- Order: Cingulata
- Family: Chlamyphoridae
- Subfamily: †Glyptodontinae
- Genus: †Eleutherocercus; Koken, 1888

Type species
- †Eleutherocercus setifer Koken, 1888

Species
- E. antiquus; E. solidus Roberto, 1924

Synonyms
- Eleutherocercus tucumanus Castellanos, 1927

= Eleutherocercus =

Eleutherocercus Temporal range: Late Miocene-Early Pliocene (Huayquerian-Montehermosan) ~9.0–4.0 Ma

Extinct genus of mammals

Eleutherocercus was a genus of glyptodonts that lived during the Late Miocene and Early Pliocene in South America. Fossils of the genus have been found in the Huayquerian Ituzaingó Formation (E. paranensis) and the Montehermosan Monte Hermoso Formation (E. antiquus) in Argentina.

== Phylogeny ==
Below are the results of a phylogenetic analysis conducted by Zurita et al., 2016 showing the position of Eleutherocercus in relation to other glyptodontines:

- - Propalaehoplophorus australis
  - - Glyptodontinae
      - Glyptotherium cylindricum
      - Glyptodon reticulatus
    - - Cochlops muricatus
      - - Plohophorus figuratus
        - Doedicurinae
          - cf. Eleutherocercus antiquus
          - Doedicurus clavicaudatus
        - - Hoplophorini
            - Hoplophorus euphractus
            - Panochthus intermedius
          - Neosclerocalyptini
            - - Neosclerocalyptus paskoensis
              - Neosclerocalyptus gouldi
            - - Neosclerocalyptus ornatus
              - - Neosclerocalyptus castellanosi
                - Neosclerocalyptus pseudornatus
