= Eosclerocalyptus =

Eosclerocalyptus Temporal range: Late Miocene ~7–5.5 Ma

Scientific classification
- Kingdom: Animalia
- Phylum: Chordata
- Class: Mammalia
- Order: Cingulata
- Family: Chlamyphoridae
- Subfamily: †Glyptodontinae
- Genus: †Eosclerocalyptus; Ameghino, 1919

Type species
- Eosclerocalyptus lineatus Ameghino, 1888

Species
- E. lineatus Moreno 1882; E. proximus Moreno & Mercerat 1891; E. tapinocephalus Cabrera 1939

Synonyms
- Genus synonymy: Eosclerophorus Castellanos, 1948; Hoplophractus Cabrera, 1939; Species synonymy: Eosclerocalyptus lilloi Ameghino 1919; Eosclerocalyptus planus Rovereto 1914; Eosclerocalyptus paulacoutoi Castellanos 1948; Neuryurus proximus Moreno & Mercerat 1891; Sclerocalyptus planus Rovereto 1914; Urotherium proximum Moreno & Mercerat 1891

Extinct genus of mammals

Eosclerocalyptus is an extinct genus of glyptodont. It lived during the Late Miocene, and its fossilized remains were discovered in South America.

== Description ==
This animal, like all glyptodonts, was protected by a carapace covering most of its body. It was very similar to Sclerocalyptus, from which it was only differentiated by its smaller size and some anatomical details, notably on its carapace. The central figures of the osteoderms were depressed, while the caudal tube protecting the tail had fewer lateral figures than those of Sclerocalyptus (only three pairs), and those were less differentiated. The cephalic shield had a particular ornamentation. The skull was tall and narrow, especially in the posterior region, and the choanae were tall and narrow. The teeth were thinner than those of Sclerocalyptus, and only the rearmost ones were trilobed.

== Classification ==
The genus Eosclerocalyptus was first described in 1919 by Carlos Ameghino, based on fossils found in terrains dated from the Late Miocene of Argentina. Various species were attributed to this genus, such as Eosclerocalyptus tapinocephalus, E. lineatus, E. proximus and E. planus. Several species from this genus were previously ascribed to the genus Hoplophractus.

Eosclerocalyptus is a genus of glyptodont close to the ancestry of Neosclerocalyptus.

== Bibliography ==
- A. A. Tauber. 2005. Mamíferos fósiles y edad de la Formación Salicas (Mioceno tardío) de la sierra de Velasco, La Rioja, Argentina. Ameghiniana 42(2):443-460
- Zurita, A. E.; Aramayo, S. A. 2007. New remains of Eosclerocalyptus tapinocephalus (Cabrera) (mammalia, xenarthra, glyptodontidae): Description and implications for its taxonomic status. Rivista Italiana di Paleontologia e Stratigrafia (Research In Paleontology and Stratigraphy), [S.l.], v. 113, n. 1. ISSN 2039-4942.
