= Plohophorus =

Plohophorus Temporal range: Late Miocene – Late Pliocene ~8–3 Ma

Scientific classification
- Kingdom: Animalia
- Phylum: Chordata
- Class: Mammalia
- Order: Cingulata
- Family: Chlamyphoridae
- Subfamily: †Glyptodontinae
- Genus: †Plohophorus; Ameghino, 1887

Type species
- Plohophorus figuratus Ameghino, 1887

Species
- P. barrancalobensis Zamorano & Scillato-Yané, 2011; P. coronatus Rovereto, 1914; P. cuneiformis Ameghino, 1904; P. figuratus Ameghino, 1887; P. paranensis Ameghino, 1895; P. sygmaturus Ameghino, 1895; P. yrigoyeni Yrigoyen, 1954; P. avellaneda Quiñones, Cuadrelli, Reyes, Luna, Poiré & Zurita, 2023

Synonyms
- Plohophorus araucanus Ameghino, 1904; Plohophorus australis Moreno, 1888; Plohophorus orientalis Ameghino, 1889; Urotherium antiquum Ameghino, 1888

Extinct genus of glyptodont

Plohophorus is an extinct genus of glyptodont. it lived from the Late Miocene to the Late Pliocene, and its fossilized remains were discovered in South America.

== Description ==
Like all glyptodonts, this animal had a large carapace formed by numerous osteoderms fused together, covering most of its body. Plohophorus shared similarities with another Miocene glyptodont, Phlyctaenopyga, especially in its rather broad and low skull. The ornamentation of the caudal tube, protecting the tail, was more simplified; the peripheral figures were partially regressed and marked in the distal part; the central oval-shaped figures were contiguous to each other and only left space for small triangular areas between each other.

== Classification ==
The genus Plohophorus was first described in 1887 by Florentino Ameghino, based on fossil remains found in Upper Miocene terrains of Argentina. The type species is Plohophorus figuratus; several other species from the Late Miocene and the Early Pliocene were also attributed to the genus, such as Plohophorus paranensis, P. sygmaturus, P. cuneiformis, P. coronatus, P. ameghini, P. araucanus, P. australis and P. orientalis. According to the most recent revision of the genus, however, only the four first species are still considered valid. In 2011, a species from the Late Pliocene of Colombia, P. barrancalobensis, was described.

Plohophorus was a rather derived glyptodont, representative of the tribe Doedicurini. Its name is an anagram of Hoplophorus, a similar but more recent genus.

== References and Bibliography ==
- F. Ameghino. 1887. Apuntes preliminares sobre algunos mamíferos fósiles nuevos de la República Argentina. P.E. Coni, Buenos Aires, 17 p.
- F. Ameghino. 1889. Contribución al conocimiento de los mamíferos fósiles de la República Argentina [Contribution to the knowledge of the fossil mammals of the Argentine Republic]. Actas de la Academia Nacional de Ciencias de la República Argentina en Córdoba 6:xxxii-1027
- R. Lydekker. 1894. Contributions to a knowledge of the Fossil Vertebrates of Argentina. Part II. 2. The extinct edentates of Argentina. Anales del Museo de La Plata. Paleontología Argentina 3:1-118
- F. Ameghino. 1904. Nuevas especies de mamíferos, cretáceos y terciarios de la República Argentina [New species of mammals, Cretaceous and Tertiarty, from the Argentine Republic]. Anales de la Sociedad Cientifica Argentina 56–58:1-142
- A. L. Cione, M. M. Azpelicueta, M. Bond, A. A. Carlini, J. R. Casciotta, M. A. Cozzuol, M. Fuente, Z. Gasparini, F. J. Goin, J. Noriega, G. J. Scillato-Yane, *L. Soibelzon, E. P. Tonni, D. Verzi, and M. G. Vucetich. 2000. Miocene vertebrates from Entre Rios province, eastern Argentina. Serie Correlacion Geologica 14:191-237
- M. A. Cozzuol. 2006. The Acre vertebrate fauna: Age, diversity, and geography. Journal of South American Earth Sciences 21:185-203
- M. Zamorano and G. J. Scillato-Yané. 2011. Nueva y Más Reciente Especie de Plohophorus Ameghino (Xenarthra, Glyptodontidae) del Marplatense Inferior (Barrancalobense, Plioceno Tardío), de Barranca de los Lobos (Provincia de Buenos Aires). Ameghiniana 48(3):399-404.
- R. L. Tomassini, C. I. Montalvo, C.M. Deschamps and T. Manera. 2013. Biostratigraphy and biochronology of the Monte Hermoso Formation (early Pliocene) at its type locality, Buenos Aires Province, Argentina. Journal of South American Earth Sciences 48:31-42
