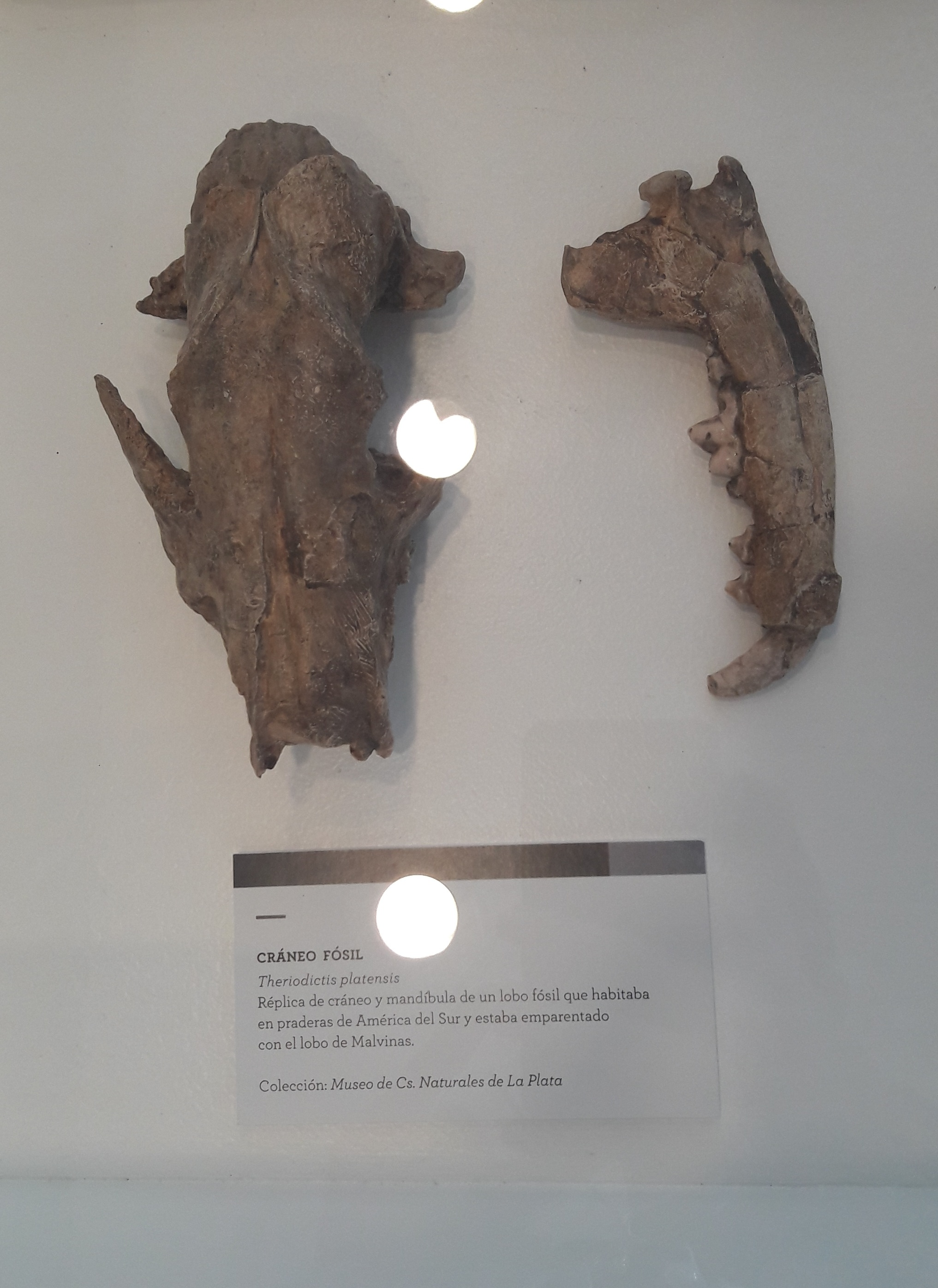
- Fossil skull in the Museo Malvinas e Islas del Atlántico Sur, Buenos Aires, Argentina.

Scientific classification
- Kingdom: Animalia
- Phylum: Chordata
- Class: Mammalia
- Order: Carnivora
- Family: Canidae
- Subfamily: Caninae
- Tribe: Canini
- Genus: †Theriodictis; Mercerat, 1891

Type species
- †T. platensis

Other species
- †?T. floridanus?

= Theriodictis =

Theriodictis Temporal range: 1–0.4 Ma Early Pleistocene - Middle Pleistocene

Extinct genus of South American canid

Theriodictis is an extinct monotypic genus of cerdocyonine canid endemic to South America during the Middle Pleistocene.

== Taxonomy ==
The genus Theriodictis was named by Alcides Mercerat in 1891. Theriodictis was part of the Cerdocyonina subtribe of the tribe Canini ("true dogs"), which in turn belongs to the Caninae subfamily of canids. The sole species of the genus, T. platensis, is a sister taxon to "Canis" gezi, and closely related to Protocyon and Speothos.

=== Diagnostics ===
Theriodictis can be differentiated from other cerdocyonines by a host of cranial features; a high zygomatic arch, wide palate, and a notable masseter process. Regarding dentition, Theriodictis can be distinguished through its molars. Both the M1 and M2 have a reduced hypocone, with the M2/m2 being smaller compared to the M1/m1. The M2 has a reduced metacone, with the m1 being without a metacone and possessing a small entocone. The P4 is also medially inclined. Similarities between Theriodictis and the much more numerous Protocyon has led to past research labelling ambiguous finds as Protocyon sensu lato. Theriodictis can be distinguished from Protocyon via a mesiodistally wider & angled inner half of the M1 (which also possessed more pronounced hypocone), along with a more pronounced protocone of the P4.

=== Disputed taxa ===
Although remains recovered from Tarija (Bolivia) were initially described as T. tarijensis, the species was synonymized with Protocyon. Similarly, some remains of T. platensis from Buenos Aires, and Corrientes (Argentina), Guamote (Ecuador), and Minas Gerais (Brazil), have been reassigned to P. troglodytes. Possible remains (designated as T. floridanus) were unearthed from the Inglis 1A locality in Florida and date to the Late Blancan faunal stage of North America, although this classification has been questioned.

== Evolution ==
Canids evolved in North America, only expanding into South America with the formation of the Isthmus of Panama ca. 3Ma, which initiated the Great American Biotic Interchange (GABI). Cerdocyonines were the only canids in South America for the vast majority of GABI. While canids first appear in the Vorohuen subage (3Ma - 2.5Ma) of the Marplatan age with Dusicyon, Theriodictis (along with the similar Protocyon) only appears in the Ensenadan age (1.8Ma - 0.4Ma) as part of the second phase of GABI.

Blaire Van Valkenburgh posited that the paucity of other large carnivores allowed the evolution and diversity of Quaternary South American canids, including large hypercarnivorous canids such as Aenocyon, Theriodictis & Protocyon, and a large omnivorous canid (Chrysocyon brachyurus). These taxa co-existed with large hypercarnivorous felids (e.g. Panthera onca, Puma concolor, Smilodon populator).

== Description ==
Theriodictis was a large sized canid; body weight for adult specimens of Theriodictis platensis has been estimated at around 30 to 40 kg. Theriodictis has been described as being larger than its close relative Protocyon. Postcranial characteristics suggest Theriodictis was cursorial, with a similar niche to modern South American foxes.

== Distribution ==
Distribution map of Theriodictis
Legend: Theriodictis sp. T. platensis

The fossil remains of T. platensis have been discovered from several localities in Buenos Aires (Argentina), while specimens referred Theriodictis sp. have been recovered from Rio Grande do Sul (Brazil). Tentative remains of Theriodictis sp. have been described from Monagas (Venezuela).

The fossil record of T. platensis has been constrained to the Late Ensenadan faunal stage (1Ma - 0.4Ma) of South America, with most fossils being only confirmed after the Brunhes-Matuyama reversal (0.78Ma). Consequently, T. platensis is considered an index fossil for the Ensenadan, and is endemic to this period.

== Diet ==
=== Morphology ===
The presence of large carnassial teeth, small post-carnassial molars and wide palate suggests Theriodictis had a hypercarnivorous diet (being more than 70% meat).

=== Predatory behavior ===
Prey is thought to have included ungulate camelids (e.g. guanaco), cervids (e.g. Epieurycerus and Antifer), equids (e.g. Equus and Hippidion), peccaries (e.g. Catagonus), giant rodents (e.g. Neochoerus), mesotherids (e.g. the burrowing Mesotherium), and giant cingulates (e.g. Eutatus, Propraopus and Pampatherium). Bone damage on toxodontid remains from La Plata could have been inflicted by Theriodictis.

=== Scavenging behavior ===
In 1988 Annalisa Berta suggested that Theriodictis may have had scavenging tendencies, with Walter D. Berman suggested that its sister species "Canis" gezi was also hypercarnivorous and osteophagous.

== Paleoecology ==
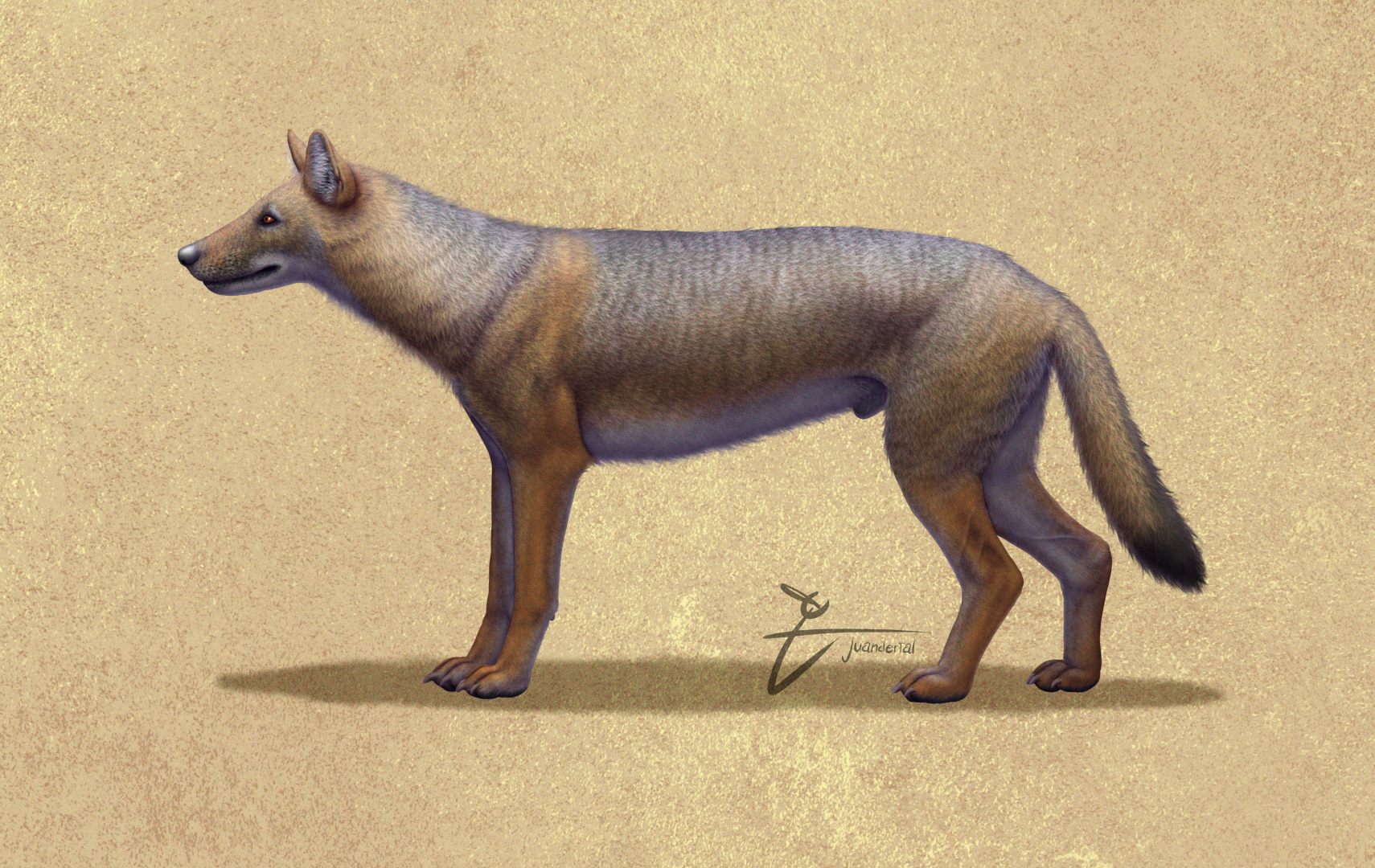
Life reconstruction

=== Competition ===
Theriodictis may have displaced the smaller Protocyon in competitive interactions, as per coyotes and wolves.

== Extinction ==
At the end of the Ensenadan age, the predator guild of South America underwent a major turnover, with Theriodictis platensis going extinct. Additional taxa which went extinct include other species of large hypercarnivorous canids (“Canis” gezi, Dusicyon ensenadensis, Protocyon scagliarum), the giant short-faced bear (Arctotherium angustidens), mustelids (e.g. Galictis henningi, Lyncodon bosei, Stipanicicia), and the last member of the giant procyonids (Cyonasua merani).
