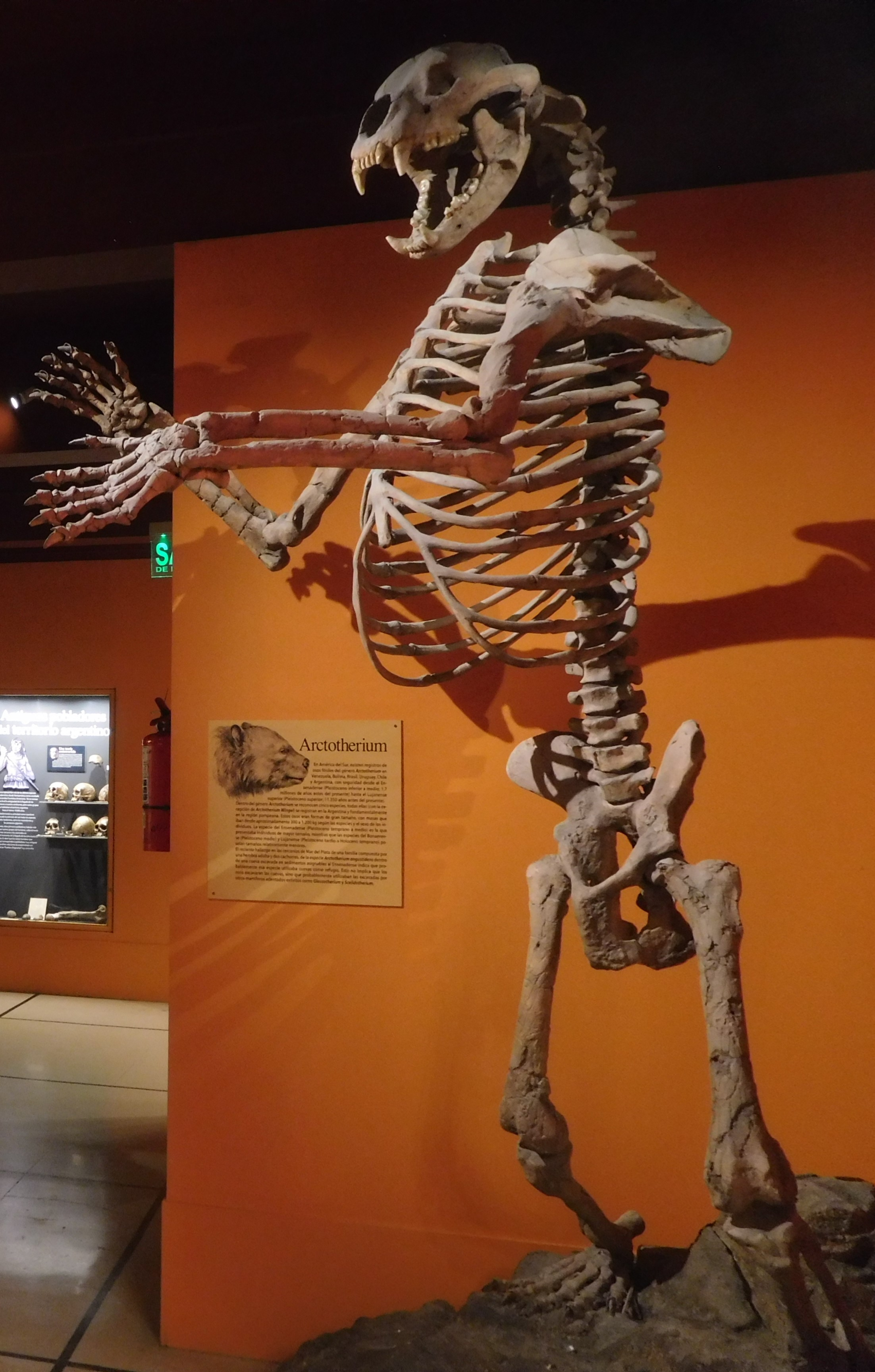
- A. angustidens skeleton at the Museo Argentino de Ciencias Naturales Bernardino Rivadavia

Scientific classification
- Kingdom: Animalia
- Phylum: Chordata
- Class: Mammalia
- Order: Carnivora
- Family: Ursidae
- Subfamily: Tremarctinae
- Genus: †Arctotherium; Bravard, 1857

Type species
- †Arctotherium bonariense Gervais, 1852

Species
- A. angustidens Gervais & Ameghino, 1880; A. bonariense Gervais, 1852 (type); A. tarijense Ameghino, 1902; A. vetustum Ameghino, 1885; A. wingei Ameghino, 1902

Synonyms
- Genus synonymy: Arctoidotherium Lydekker, 1885; Pararctotherium Ameghino, 1904; Proarctotherium Ameghino, 1904; Pseudarctotherium Kraglievich, 1928; Species synonymy: A. angustidens: Arctotherium latideno (sic) Bravard, 1857; Arctotherium latidens Bravard, 1857; Arctodus angustidens Berta & Marshall, 1978; Arctodus candiotti Berman, 1994; Arctodus latidens Berman, 1994; Arctoidotherium angustidens Kraglievich & Ameghino, 1940; Arctoidotherium candiottii Kraglievich & Ameghino, 1940; Arctotherium candiottii Ameghino C., 1916; Pararctotherium enectum Carlini & Tonni, 2000; A. bonariense: Arctodus bonaerensis Berman, 1994; Arctodus bonaerense Fariña et al., 1998; Arctodus bonariensis Kurtén, 1967; Arctodus pamparum crassidens Berman, 1994; Arctotherium bonaerense Ameghino, 1889; Arctotherium bonaerensis Rusconi, 1932; Arctotherium bonaeriensis Ameghino, 1885; Arctotherium bonaeriense Ameghino, 1889; Arctotherium bonariense Gervais & Ameghino, 1880; Arctotherium bonariensis Kraglievich & Ameghino, 1940; ?Arctotherium platensis? Fariña, 2025; Pararctotherium bonariense Soibelzon et al., 2000; Pararctotherium pamparum crassidens Kraglievich, 1934; Ursus bonariensis Gervais, 1852; Ursus bonaerensis Ameghino, 1889; A. tarijense: Arctotherium tarijensis Rusconi, 1932; Arctodus pamparus Kurtén, 1967; Arctodus enectum Berman, 1994 partim; Arctodus pamparum Berman, 1994 partim; Arctotherium pamparum Trajano & Ferrarezzi,1994; Arctotherium enectum Trajano & Ferrarezzi,1994; Pararctotherium enectum Ameghino, 1904 partim; Pararctotherium ennectum Kraglievich, 1934; Pararctotherium pamparum Ameghino, 1904 partim; Pararctotherium tarijensis Rusconi, 1932; Proarctotherium tarijense Kraglievich & Ameghino, 1940; A. vetustum: Arctodus debilis Berta & Marshall, 1978; Arctodus pamparum Berman, 1994, partim; Arctodus vetustus Berta y Marshall, 1978; Arctotherium debilis Paula Couto, 1960; Proarctotherium vetustum Ameghino, 1904; Pseudarctotherium debilis Kraglievich, 1934; Pseudarctotherium lundi Kraglievich & Ameghino, 1940; A. wingei: Arctodus brasiliensis Kurtén, 1967; Arctoidotherium brasiliensis Lydekker, 1885; Arctotherium brasiliensis Lund, 1804; Arctotherium brasiliense Lund, 1840; ?Panthera balamoides? Stinnesbeck, 2019; Pararctotherium brasiliensis Paula Couto, 1943; Pararctotherium parodii Kraglievich & Ameghino 1940; Pseudarctotherium brasiliensis Kraglievich & Ameghino, 1940; Pseudarctotherium majus Kraglievich & Ameghino, 1940; Pseudarctotherium wingei Rusconi 1932; Ursus brasiliensis Lund, 1839; Ursus lundii Kraglievich & Ameghino, 1940; Ursus major Lund (MS)

= Arctotherium =

Arctotherium Temporal range: 3–0.09 Ma Late Pliocene - Early Holocene

Extinct genus of bears

Arctotherium angustidens ("bear beast") is an extinct genus of short-faced bears endemic to Central and South America (Neotropics) from the Late Pliocene to the end of the Late Pleistocene. Arctotherium migrated from North America to South America during the Great American Interchange, following the formation of the Isthmus of Panama during the late Pliocene.

The earliest recovered remains of Arctotherium are from Central America and northern South America, with specimens referred to Arctotherium c.f. wingei and Arctotherium sp. from the Plio-Pleistocene boundary of Venezuela, and Arctotherium sp. from the Early Pleistocene of El Salvador, dated to between 3Ma and 1.8Ma. Arctotherium reappears later as Arctotherium angustidens ca. 1Ma, which subsequently remains as the only confirmed species for the rest of the Early Pleistocene and early Middle Pleistocene. Around 400,000 years ago, Arctotherium angustidens is replaced in the fossil record by all other species of Arctotherium. Correspondingly, Arctotherium is known from the Blancan and Rancholabrean faunal stages in North America, and the Marplatan, Ensenadan and Lujanian faunal stages of South America.

Arctotherium angustidens is one of the largest known bears and possibly the largest terrestrial carnivorous mammal ever, with some individuals suggested to exceed 1.2 t (2,645.5 lb) in body mass and reach 3.4 to 4.3 m (11.2 to 14.1 ft) in standing height, while later species such as A. bonariense, A. tarijense and A. wingei were smaller and comparable in size to living bears.

Arctotherium is believed to have preferred open habitats with arid and semi-arid climates. While Arctotherium is suggested to have diversified in the tropical Americas, specimens are concentrated in the Southern Cone of South America. Like living bears, species of the genus were omnivorous, with the degree of meat consumption varying between species, with Arctotherium angustidens suggested to have been a highly carnivorous, while A. wingei was largely herbivorous.

The last species of the genus (A. bonariense, A. tarijense and A. wingei) went extinct around 13,000 - 9,000 years ago as part of the end-Pleistocene extinction event, along with most other large mammals across the Americas.

== Taxonomy ==
Arctotherium was named by Hermann Burmeister in 1879. Arctotherium is part of the Tremarctinae subfamily of bears, otherwise known as the short faced bears, which also includes Arctodus (North American short faced bears), Plionarctos and Tremarctos (the Floridian and modern spectacled bear). In the 19th and early 20th centuries, specimens of Arctotherium were occasionally referred to Arctodus, and vice versa, along with other synonyms.

=== Systematics ===
Within Arctotherium, two clades are thought to exist- A. bonariense and A. tarijense have been described as the most derived species of the genus, whilst A. vetustum and A. wingei are regarded the most archaic, even more so than A. angustidens. Of these successor species, A. tarijense and A. wingei are by far the most successful when taking into account temporal & geographic range, and the frequency of fossil finds. A separate highland form of Arctotherium is also suggested to have existed at the end of the Pleistocene, consisting of the type A. wingei specimen from Tarija and an Arctotherium sp. individual from El Rodeo, in contrast with the larger and more robust Brazilian A. wingei specimens.

Although A. wingei is only known from partial cranial and dental remains elsewhere, the A. wingei skeletons identified from Hoyo Negro in Mexico are the most complete known for its species, the Arctotherium genus and all extinct Tremarctine bears. The Hoyo Negro specimens confirm that the A. wingei had a high degree of intraspecific morphological variation.

==== Cladogram ====
Below is a cladogram showing proposed relationships between Arctotherium species, based on morphological data.

- - Tremarctos
- - - A. vetustum
    - A. wingei
  - - A. angustidens
    - - A. bonariense
      - A. tarijense

=== Diagnostics ===
Size can be a useful indicator in differentiating between species of Arctotherium, but cranial and dental features need to be examined for a definite identification. The upper canine is very similar between species of Arctotherium, differing mainly in size. The canine of A. wingei is the smallest among the species. The lower canine of A. wingei presents two enamel ridges as in A. angustidens and A. tarijense, while in A. vetustum and A. bonariense there are three ridges. In A. vetustum, the distal ridge is very small and the mesial ridge is small, while in A. angustidens and A. tarijense both ridges are large.

== Evolution ==
=== Tremarctinae ===
Tremarctinae originate with their common ancestor, Plionarctos. Around the Miocene-Pliocene boundary (~5.3 Ma) Tremarctines, along with other ursids, experienced an explosive radiation in diversity, as C4 vegetation (grasses) and open habitats dominated, the world experienced a major temperature drop and increased seasonality, and a faunal turnover which extinguished 60–70% of all Eurasian faunal genera, and 70–80% of North American genera.

Placement of Arctotherium within Tremarctinae and Ursidae based on mitochondrial DNA

- †Hemicyoninae
- - †Ursavinae
  - - Ailuropodinae
    - - Ursinae
      - - Tremarctinae (short-faced bears)
          - †Plionarctos
          - - †Arctodus
            - - Tremarctos
              - †Arctotherium

Genetic research on the mitochondrial DNA of tremarctine bears indicates that the mitochondrial DNA lineage of Arctotherium was more closely related to Tremarctos than Arctodus (though mitochondrial DNA lineages can be discordant with actual ancestral history based on the nuclear genome due to introgression or incomplete lineage sorting). A preliminary investigation of nuclear DNA sequences of tremarctine bears instead suggested that Tremarctos is more closely related to Arctodus than to Arctotherium, and there had been an extensive history of hybridization between Tremarctos and Arctodus in North America, although hybridization with Arctotherium (likely A. wingei) is possible, either in Central America throughout the Pleistocene or as Tremarctos migrated southwards into South America at the end of the Pleistocene.

=== North America ===
Some researchers suggest that Arctotherium either emerged from the Tremarctos genus or was a sister lineage to Tremarctos, Plionarctos harroldum may have been the ancestor of both genera as a transitional P. c.f. harroldum specimen from Washington state, USA (2.9Ma) appears to be evolutionarily intermediate between P. harroldum and T. floridanus.

Genetic research suggests an origin for Arctotherium in the Early Pliocene, with the mean genetic divergence dates for Arctotherium, Arctodus and Tremarctos between 5.5Ma and 4.8 Ma, and between Arctotherium and Tremarctos at 4.1 Ma. Arctotherium may have existed in North America for several million years without being present in the fossil record, or possibly island-hopped to mainland South America prior to formation of the Isthmus of Panama, before the establishment of a direct land connection between North and South America approximately 3 Ma.

All three genera are first recorded in North America from the Early Pleistocene of the Late Blancan faunal stage (with Arctotherium sp. being recovered from El Salvador), however the first possible records of Arctotherium are from the Plio-Pleistocene boundary of Venezuela (ca. 3Ma). While Tremarctos floridanus was once described from the Yucatán Peninsula, subsequent research reassigned these specimens to Arctotherium wingei, and established Arctotherium as being the only known bear from the Plio-Pleistocene of the Neotropical realm (Central and South America).

=== South America ===
The first possible records of Arctotherium sp. and A. c.f. wingei are from the El Breal de Orocual tar pits in Venezuela, dated to the Late Pliocene and Early Pleistocene (ca. 3Ma), discrediting the hypothesis that ursids were only part of the second phase of the Great American Interchange ca. 1.8Ma. Tropical South America is believed to have been central to the diversification of Arctotherium, as almost all species have been recovered from at least one locality in the tropics. Beyond these early remains, the only confirmed Arctotherium species in South America from the Early Pleistocene is the gigantic A. angustidens from Buenos Aires, Argentina (1Ma). What the evolutionary history of Arctotherium was beforehand, particularly regarding its sudden significant size, is unclear. While early Arctotherium sp. from El Salvador and Venezuela have been recorded as sharing affinities with A. angustidens, A. angustidens remains have been only been dated to between 1Ma to 0.4 Ma of the Pleistocene, which corresponds with the Ensenadan faunal stage.

A. angustidens went extinct at the start of the Lujanian faunal stage in the late Middle Pleistocene (~400,000 years ago), and was replaced by medium-sized Arctotherium species. The first recorded successor species was A. vetustum (Middle Pleistocene), then shortly thereafter by the more robustly built A. bonariense (Middle / Late Pleistocene), along with A. tarijense (Middle Pleistocene to the Early Holocene). While the smallest but most widespread species, A. wingei, is only confirmed from the Late Pleistocene and Early Holocene, the species' more tropical disposition is thought to greatly limit fossilisation. That, along with A. wingei's more ancestral position in Arctotherium, and tentatively assigned remains from the Plio-Pleistocene boundary of Venezuela, suggests an origin from at least the Middle Pleistocene.

== Description ==
=== Skull ===
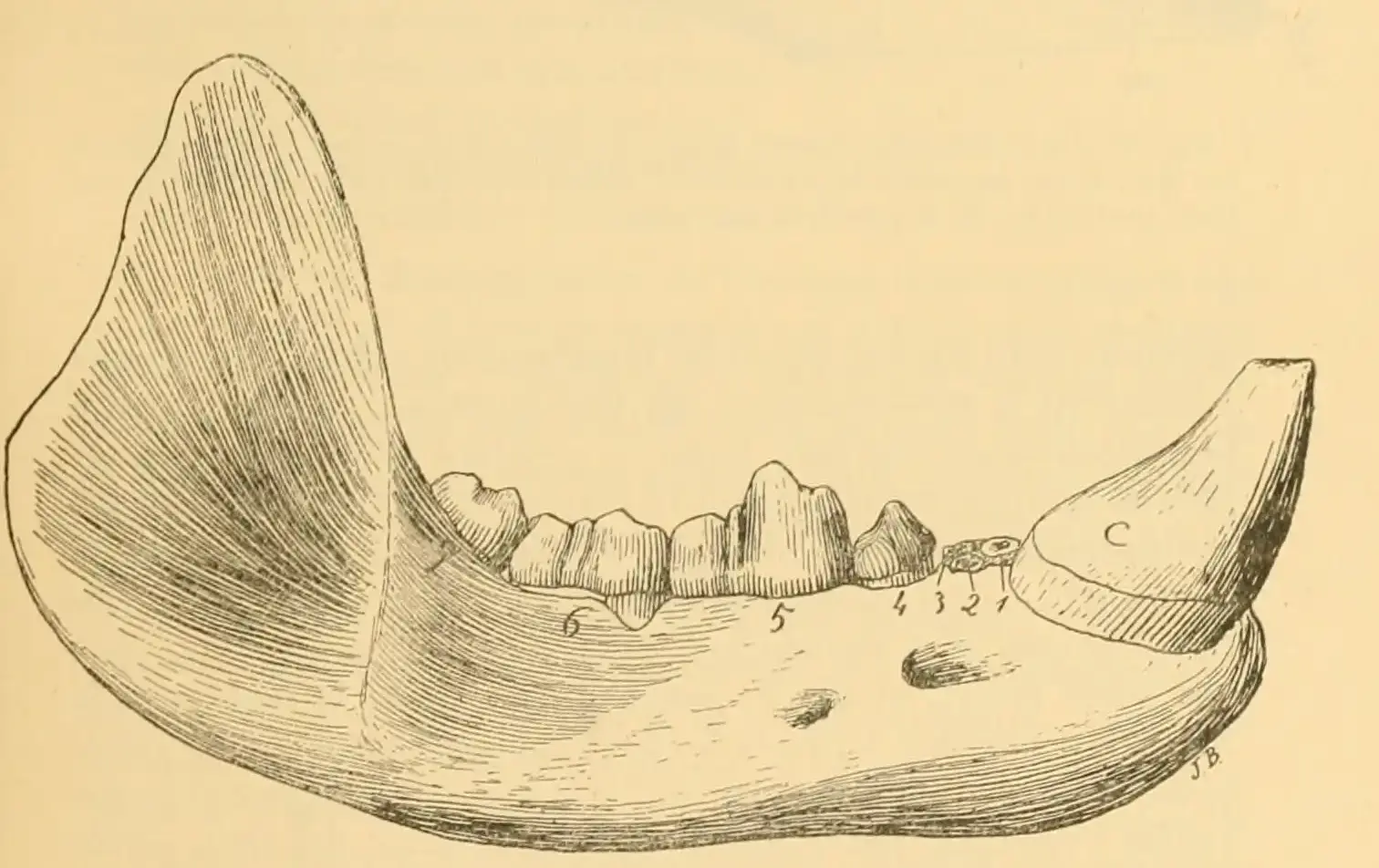
Mandible (lower jaw) of A. tarijense

Tremarctinae (and therefore Arctotherium) appeared to have disproportionately shorter snouts compared to most modern bears, hence the name "short-faced" was given to them. This apparent shortness is an illusion caused by the deep snouts and short nasal bones of tremarctine bears compared with ursine bears; Arctotherium had a deeper but not a shorter face than most living bears.

In comparison with other studied Tremarctine bears (A. angustidens, A. bonariense, T. floridanus & T. ornatus) Arctotherium tarijense exhibited major morphological differences in the anatomy of its auditory bulla, showing some similarities with ursine bears. Researchers suggest that this morphology gave A. tarijense a relative high vestibular sensitivity and possibly greater agility, and therefore a better ability to explore diverse habitats. The canalis semicircularis lateral also suggests A. tarijense had a 40° head posture, which being higher than A. angustidens (32°) and A. bonariense (24°) could infer a greater capacity for long distance vision in A. tarijense.

Baby (deciduous) teeth have also been recovered from a 4-5 month old A. tarijense specimen (found in association with an adult), and Arctotherium angustidens. Although the baby teeth of A. tarijense resemble those of ursine bears, the adult teeth are divergent.

=== Postcranial ===
The shape of the elbow joint suggests the possibility of semi-arboreal locomotion for Arctodus sp., Arctotherium bonariense, and A. wingei, but the size of the elbow joint does not. As the medial epicondyle is particularly expanded in these species, it is likely that (as for the giant panda) the fossil Arctodus and Arctotherium retained this feature in relation to their higher degree of forelimb dexterity. As these genera convergently evolved towards increased body size, this high degree of proximal dexterity may have been advantageous and therefore retained in the Tremarctinae, such as for a scavenging lifestyle.

A. bonariense is believed to have convergently evolved several adaptations with Arctodus simus and Agriotherium / Huracan, such as proportionally longer limbs, very large body size, short broad rostrums, premasseteric fossa on the mandible, and possible carnassial shears. Additionally, an analysis of the elbow joint of several Arctotherium species and an indeterminate Arctodus specimen suggested a mutual preference for mixed habitats. The postcranial skeleton of A. tarijense is unknown.

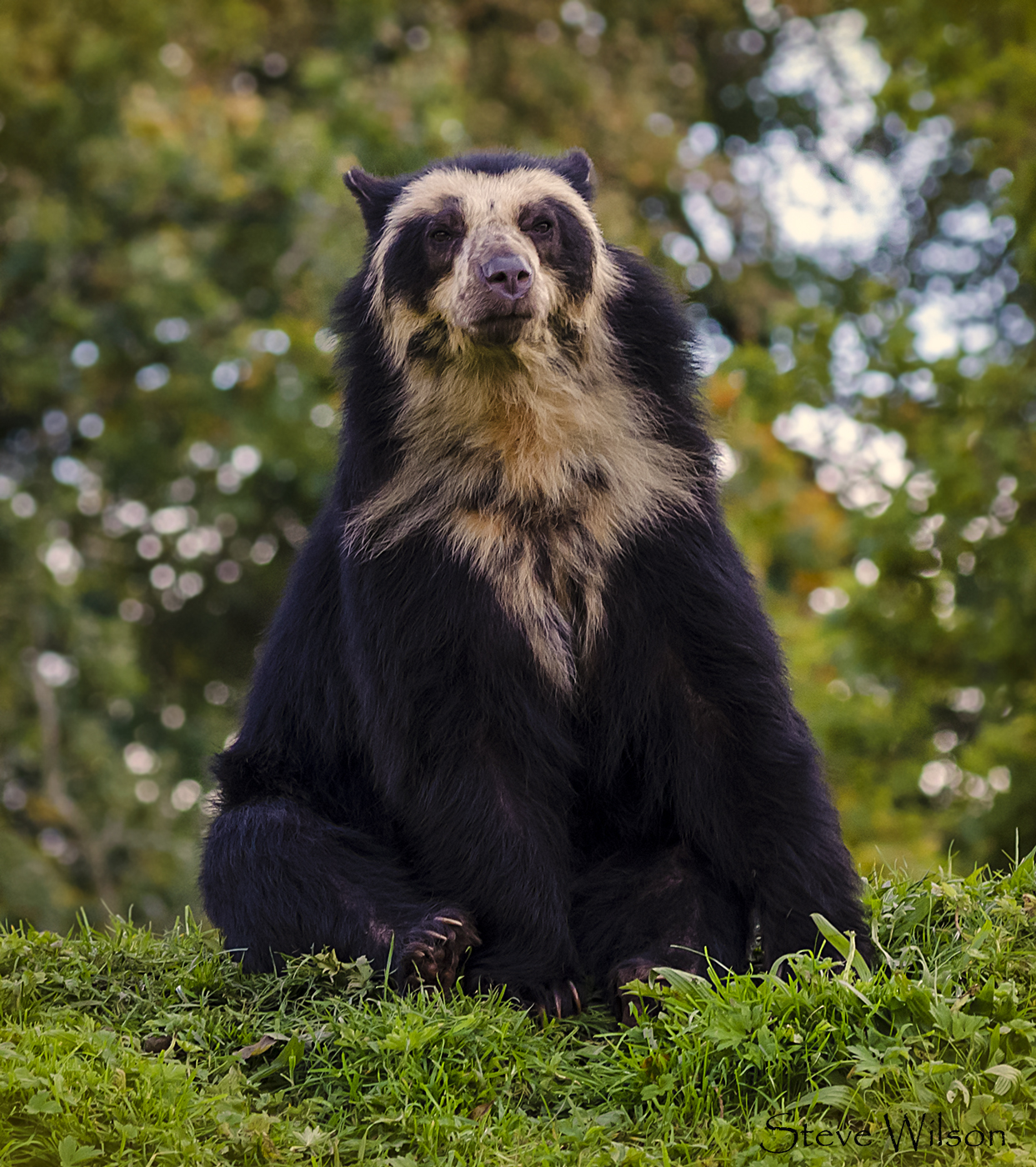
The last short-faced bear, and the ecological successor of A. wingei, is the spectacled bear.

=== Size ===
Arctotherium consists of one early giant form, A. angustidens, and several succeeding smaller species, which were within the size range of modern bears. Arctotherium species ranged between a variety of sizes, both between species and individuals of the same species. The sole remaining Tremarctine bear, the spectacled bear, exhibits strong sexual dimorphism, with adult males being 30–50% larger than females.

Various attempts to calculate each species' body mass have been made; for example, a 2006 study calculated the mean weight of two species, A. bonariense at ~110 kg (243 lb) (hypothetical typical weight range = 106–122 kg (234–269 lb)), and A. tarijense at ~139 kg (306 lb) (range of 102–189 kg (225–417 lb)).

According to a 2009 study, the weight ranges for Arctotherium were calculated as follows- A. wingei at 51–150 kg (112–331 lb), A. vetustum at 102–300 kg (225–661 lb), A. tarijense at 135–400 kg (298–882 lb), A. bonariense between 171–500 kg (377–1,102 lb), and A. angustidens at 412–1,200 kg (908–2,646 lb). The study considered each end figure as the maximum hypothetical weight. Further studies calculated an A. tarijense specimen's weight (MACN 971) at 231 kg (509 lb), and A. wingei specimens from the Brazilian intertropical region at ~83 kg (183 lb).

An extraordinarily large specimen of A. angustidens recovered in 2011 from Buenos Aires shows an individual estimated, using the humerus, to weigh between 983 and 2,042 kg (2,167 and 4,502 lb). However, the authors consider the upper limit as improbable, and say that 1,588 to 1,749 kg (3,501 to 3,856 lb) is more likely. An estimated standing height for this A. angustidens individual is between 3.4 and 4.3 m (11.2 and 14.1 ft). It would still make the species the largest bear ever found, and contender for the largest carnivorous land mammal known.

While Arctotherium's other surviving lineages were much smaller than A. angustidens, Arctodus underwent the opposite transformation, transitioning from the medium-sized A. pristinus to the gigantic A. simus by the end of the Pleistocene. Except for an extraordinarily large specimen of A. angustidens, the largest specimens of A. simus and A. angustidens are said to be comparable to one another, and match the absolute upper size limit (~1,000 kg (2,200 lb)) of a terrestrial mammalian carnivore (based on the more restrictive energy base for a carnivorous diet).

== Distribution ==
Distribution map of Arctotherium

Legend: Arctotherium sp. A. angustidens. A. bonariense A. tarijense

A. vetustum A. wingei

=== Early & Middle Pleistocene ===
The earliest records of Arctotherium come from the Plio-Pleistocene boundary of Venezuela (Arctotherium sp. & Arctotherium c.f. wingei), and the Early Pleistocene of El Salvador (Arctotherium sp.). However, Arctotherium only reappears as Arctotherium angustidens from the Early & Middle Pleistocene of Argentina and Tolomosa Formation in southern Bolivia. In the end of the Ensenadan age, corresponding to the late Middle Pleistocene (400 kya), A. angustidens disappears, whereas all other species of Arctotherium emerge in the fossil record. Remains are concentrated in the Southern Cone of South America, with the exception of A. wingei, which inhabited a more northern range.

=== Late Pleistocene ===
By the Late Pleistocene, A. tarijense held domain over the open and semi-arid Pampas and Patagonian habitats of southern South America, inhabiting Argentina, Patagonian Chile, southern Bolivia, and Uruguay, although A. bonariense may have also been contemporary in Late Pleistocene Uruguay. A. tarijense has been described as having a very low density of fossil material in Patagonia. A unassigned Arctotherium sp. has also been recorded from southernmost Brazil.

On the other hand, A. wingei spanned across the northern, tropical parts of the continent, throughout the tropical savanna forests of Brazil to Bolivia, Venezuela, and into North America (the Yucatán Peninsula of Belize and Mexico). A possible A. wingei specimen has also been found in northwest Argentina, with a possible record of A. vetustum from central Brazil.

== Diet ==
=== A. angustidens ===
Using carbon isotopes, A. angustidens' diet has been posited to be omnivorous with a preference towards large quantities of meat. Beyond the scavenging of mega-herbivore carcasses, the type of tooth wear present amongst A. angustidens specimens, in addition to the frequency of broken teeth from most specimens (especially at older ages), suggests the active predation of large vertebrates, including but not limited to horses, tapirs, camelids, macraucheniids, glyptodonts, giant ground sloths, toxodontids, and gomphotheres by A. angustidens.

=== A. bonariense & A. tarijense ===
A. bonariense and A. tarijense had a typical prey weight of 100 kg (220 lb), with a maximum of 300 kg (661 lb). A. tarijense occasionally hunted camelids and horses as a supplement to scavenging, smaller prey and herbivory. Carbon isotope studies from southernmost Patagonia suggest that A. tarijense was a particularly active scavenger. Although carnivory increased the further south Arctotherium lived, carbon isotopes suggest that A. tarijense's prey weight limit peaked at 300 kg, leaving the (subadult and younger) mega-mammals, such as the gomphotheres, giant ground sloths, and toxodontids, to Smilodon populator and giant jaguars. Smilodon fatalis, Arctotherium bonariense, Canis nehringi, maned wolves, and humans would have also joined this predator guild at various stages of the Lujanian. However, a fragmented Arctotherium c.f. tarijense tooth from Baño Nuevo-1 cave in southern Chile preserves cavities, which could be interpreted as a consequence of consuming carbohydrate-rich foods such as fruit or honey. A further microwear analysis attempt of the tooth in 2015 was complicated by hard plant and bone consumption causing similar damage to teeth in omnivores.

=== A. vetustum & A. wingei ===
Along with clues from various teeth of A. wingei, carbon isotope studies suggest that A. wingei, at least in the Brazilian intertropical region, were highly herbivorous, specialising in C3 vegetative matter such as fruits and leaves. However, the diet of A. wingei was not necessarily orthodox, with carnivory likely peaking in times of resource instability. Isotope spikes from the Brazilian Intertropical Region also indicate the occasional consumption of the ground sloth Nothrotherium maquinense (hypothesized as a preference for younger individuals and opportunistic scavenging), and A. wingei itself, which could represent cannibalism for juveniles or cubs, as observed in American black bears and polar bears.

Additionally, several bite marks on recovered fossils of herbivores, such as Glossotherium and Equus, are suggested to have been inflicted by scavenging short-faced bears across Lujanian South America. According to a 2021 study, the maximum prey for A. wingei would be around its own bodyweight (~83 kg (183 lb)).

== Paleobiology ==
=== Hibernation ===
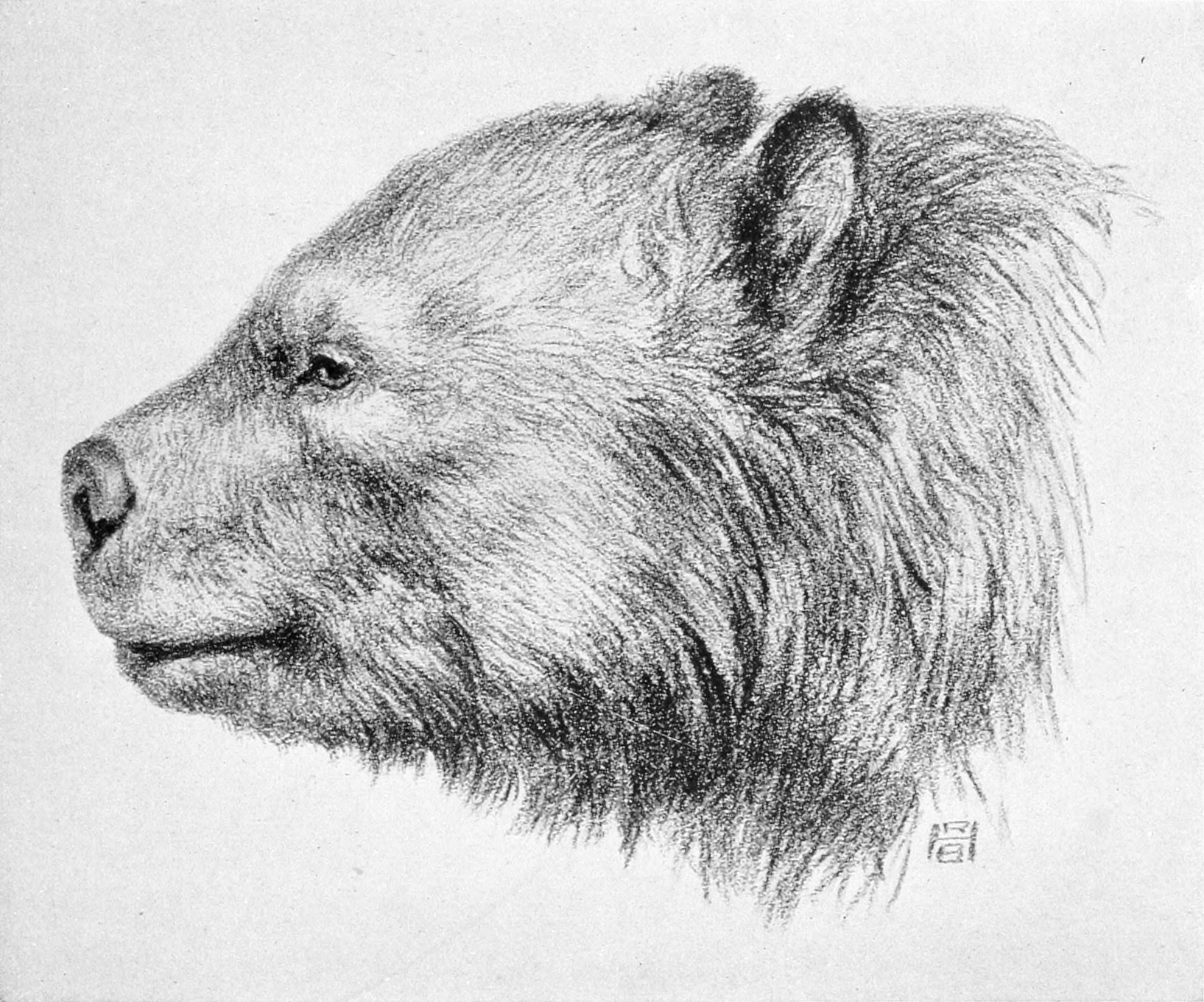
Life restoration of Arctotherium bonariense.

Three A. angustidens individuals were discovered in a paleoburrow together (postulated to have been a mother with adolescent cubs, in association with Scelidodon and Scelidotherium skulls), which opens the possibility that A. angustidens used dens for hibernation. In contrast with the spectacled bear's tropical and temperate habitat, Pleistocene Argentina's seasonal and often harsh climate suggests quasi-hibernation would have been an effective strategy for survival, as ursine bears do today. A. angustidens is thought to have reoccupied caves excavated by Xenarthra, such as the mylodonts Glossotherium and Scelidotherium, and the pampatheriid Pampatherium. As suitable paleoburrows are rare before the Great American Interchange, it has been suggested that predation and competition for dens by the newly arrived eutherian carnivores, especially by A. angustidens, increased the rate of xenarthran cave excavations. Other Arctotherium species such as A. tarijense (southern Chile) and A. wingei (Brazil and Venezuela) have been recovered from caves and are also hypothesized to have utilised dens.

=== Relationship with other bears ===
Traditionally based on morphological data, Arctodus and Arctotherium were thought to be more closely related to each other than to Tremarctos. A 2016 mitochondrial DNA study found that the mitochondrial genome of Arctotherium is closer to the spectacled bear (Tremarctos ornatus), than to Arctodus of North America. The authors of the study suggested that this implied Arctotherium and Arctodus evolved large size in a convergent manner. However, as Arctotherium and Arctodus had divergent evolutionary trends towards body size as the Pleistocene progressed, they are believed to have had separate selective pressures. As Arctotherium shrank in size as the Pleistocene cooled, Bergmann's rule is not believed to be the cause of the initial gigantism of A. angustidens. Instead, the initial lack of large predators and abundance of herbivores in South America when Arctotherium migrated into the continent likely fueled increased size. This reversed as the predator guild matured in the Middle Pleistocene, leading to the disappearance of A. angustidens and more herbivorous diets in Arctotherium.

Tremarctos does not appear in the South American fossil record until the Holocene, suggesting that the extant spectacled bear descends from an independent, later dispersal event from North America to that of Arctotherium, possibly after A. wingei became extinct in the Americas. However, the ranges of the spectacled bear, a specialist of highland Andean forests, and the more lowland & open-environ adapted Arctotherium, could have co-existed in South America. Researchers suggest an altitude of 1,800 meters (such as in Andean valleys) represented a buffer zone between the genera.

=== Trackways ===
Footprints from Pehuén-Có (Argentina) under the ichnotaxon Ursichnus sudamericanus were assigned to Arctotherium tarijense due to their Late Pleistocene age. Similar in dimensions & body mass to a male spectacled bear (13.8cm long & 13.2 cm wide manus, 22cm long & 11.8cm wide foot), the tracks show an inward rotation of 10°, with the strides being 65cm in length. Long claws are visible, and digit III is longer than the others; the heel impression is absent in the manus.

=== Paleopathology ===
Beyond the scavenging of mega-herbivore carcasses, the type of tooth wear present amongst A. angustidens specimens, in addition to the frequency of broken teeth from most specimens (especially at older ages), suggests the active predation of large vertebrates, including but not limited to horses, tapirs, camelids, macraucheniids, glyptodonts, giant ground sloths, toxodontids, and gomphotheres by A. angustidens. Of the dentition known from later Arctotherium species, only one specimen of A. bonariense exhibits the same cracked teeth which A. angustidens had, although extreme wear of the occlusal molar surface is common throughout the genus. A microwear analysis attempt of Arctotherium c.f. tarijense in 2015, suggests the consumption of hard plant and bone consumption caused similar damage to teeth in omnivores. The pathologies found on a huge specimen of A. angustidens, being multiple deep injuries which had long healed despite infection, demonstrate a lifestyle of conflict.

== Paleoecology ==
The North American carnivorans that invaded South America probably quickly adopted the predatory niches formerly occupied by the native typical South American groups such as metatherian sparassodonts and phorusracids that had largely gone extinct shortly prior to their arrival. Arctotherium is believed to have been adapted to the open areas of arid and semi-arid habitats. The first possible record of Arctotherium sp. and Arctotherium c.f. wingei is from the El Breal de Orocual tar pits in Venezuela, dated to the Late Pliocene and Early Pleistocene, and from the Early Pleistocene of El Salvador.

In the Southern Cone of South America, Arctotherium angustidens appears first and was endemic to the Ensenadan faunal stage, while all subsequent species are only found in the proceeding Lujanian faunal stage.After A. angustidens became extinct at the end of the Ensenadan, two forms begin to appear in the fossil record. The A. bonariense / A. tarijense species complex was composed of adaptable, cosmopolitan omnivores, whereas A. vetustum & A. wingei were largely herbivorous. However, as A. vetustum and A. wingei are the most archaic species of Arctotherium, their lineage must have existed before the emergence of A. angustidens in the Enseadan period of the Early Pleistocene. Although A. angustidens was highly carnivorous, it has been suggested that as a diverse carnivore guild became established in South America, the Arctotherium genus began to revert to more classic ursid diets as the ecosystem matured in the Middle Pleistocene.

=== Tropical Americas ===
==== Central America ====
One of the oldest known specimens of Arctotherium consists of a baby tooth (dp4 molar) found in the C1 member of the Río Tomayate locality of Cuscatlán Formation of El Salvador, along with a partial Borophagus skull, dated to the late Blancan faunal stage (roughly corresponding to the Gelasian period ca. 1.8 Ma). The archaic form and size of the tooth is closest to A. angustidens, however as only few other baby teeth has been recovered from Arctotherium, the tooth was only confidently assigned at the genus level as Arctotherium sp.

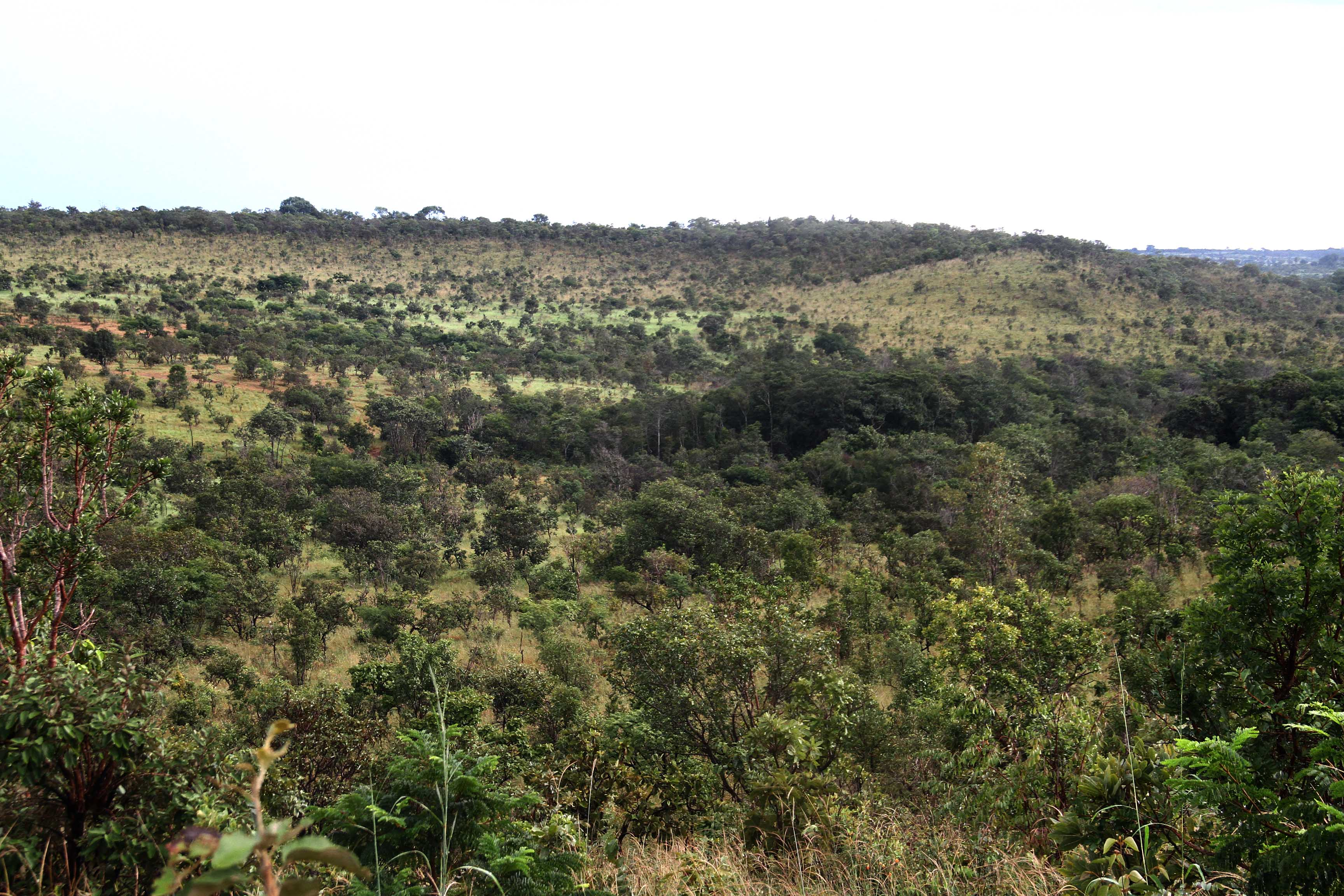
Tropical savanna forests and grasslands, such as the modern Cerrado, would have supplanted the Amazon as the dominant biome of Pleistocene South America, and stretched into Central America. This was A. wingei's preferred habitat.

However, Arctotherium fossils in Central America only subsequently found in the Late Pleistocene (Rancholabrean) of the Yucatán Peninsula, with A. wingei finds from Belize and Mexico. A. wingei is believed to have restricted the range of Tremarctos floridanus at the Yucatán Peninsula, with Tremarctos only being able to migrate into the Neotropics once A. wingei went extinct. Subsequently, T. floridanus remains from Central America (and the dubious Panthera balamoides) are believed to represent A. wingei.

A. wingei has been recovered from cenotes & cave systems across the Yucatán; the Hoyo Negro also preserves ground sloths (Nohochichak xibalbahkah, Nothrotheriops shastensis), Cuvieronius, Baird's tapir, Smilodon fatalis, Protocyon, puma, bobcat, collared peccary, and white-nosed coati from a tropical forest, while Extinction Cave contains armadillo, Panthera atrox, jaguar, puma, collared peccary, Palaeolama mirifica, red brocket deer, Bison sp., Equus conversidens, and Smilodon fatalis from a mixed grassland / scrub savanna. A. wingei's association with Protocyon in the Hoyo Negro, another animal previously thought to be endemic to South America, suggests a complex relationship of faunal interchange long after the Great American Interchange.

==== Caribbean South America ====
The oldest and youngest confirmed records of Arctotherium come from the Caribbean coast of Venezuela. At the El Breal de Orocual tar pits, Arctotherium occurs with the first known records of Homotherium and Protocyon.

==== Cerrado & Caatinga ====
In the low-density savanna forests of the Brazilian Intertropical Region, A. wingei, pumas and jaguars played a supporting role to the (also likely solitary) Smilodon populator's dominance of the regional predator guild, avoiding competition with Protocyon troglodytes in more open savanna. Being smaller and more herbivorous, A. wingei would have also likely competed with other smaller carnivorans present in the BIR, such as jaguarundi, Lycalopex, Chrysocyon, Cerdocyon, Theriodictis, Speothos, Nasua, Procyon, Eira, Conepatus, Galictis, and Leopardus.

==== Chaco ====
The Tarija Valley of Bolivia is the only locality which records three species of Arctotherium; A. angustidens (Ensenadan) and A. tarijense & A. wingei (Lujanian). Although Tarija preserves many typical Pampean species, the higher frequency of gomphothere, horse, capybara and tapir remains is unique, with the latter two being restricted today to warmer and wetter regions.

=== Southern Cone ===
Almost all Arctotherium species appear to be largely restricted to the Southern Cone, particularly Argentina, with the richest records being in the Buenos Aires Province. Arctotherium appears in the fossil record of southern South America in the Early Pleistocene (1 Ma) as the enormous A. angustidens, from the Buenos Aires Province of Argentina. A. angustidens is the best known species of Arctotherium from the Early Pleistocene.

The first recorded Arctotherium specimens in southern South America occur alongside the earliest known South American records of other fauna of North American origin; deer, tapirs, felids (e.g. Felis, Homotherium, Panthera, Puma, Smilodon), and mephitids, in what is referred to as the Mesotherium cristatum biozone. Holoarctic origin ungulates and carnivorans experienced an uptick in diversity via speciation within South America; while native Xenarthrans also experienced a notable increase in diversity, there was a decrease in native Notoungulates.

==== Northwestern highlands ====
An Arctotherium sp. with affinities with A. wingei was recovered from the Late Pleistocene El Rodeo locality in the Andean valleys of northwestern Argentina (Catamarca Province), with another Arctotherium sp. being found in the adjacent San Luis Province. The presence of Arctotherium in El Rodeo has led researchers to believe that temperate semi-arid & open environments prevailed, in contrast to the subtropical Chacoan vegetation of the site. The Sierras Pampeanas of Late Pleistocene San Luis represents a transitional environ between the Arid Diagonal and the Pampas Plain, with the megaherbivore community being largely of Pampean origin.

==== Pampas ====
===== Ensenadan faunal stage =====
In the Ensenadan, A. angustidens was only rivalled in size by Smilodon populator, with Theriodictis platensis, Canis gezi, Protocyon scagliorum, Panthera onca and pumas rounding out the predator guild in the Early Pleistocene Argentina. The extinction of the scavenger-niche specialist procyonid Chapalmalania during this faunal turnover event has been hypothesized as being the gateway for A. angustidens' gigantism. Additionally, the evolution of highly-modified spiny osteoderms in Pleistocene-era Glyptodon has been attributed to the arrival of large carnivorans such as A. angustidens in South America. A higher proportion of older A. angustidens individuals have been recovered than other Arctotherium species. A. angustidens is considered an index fossil for the Ensenadan faunal stage.

===== Lujanian faunal stage =====
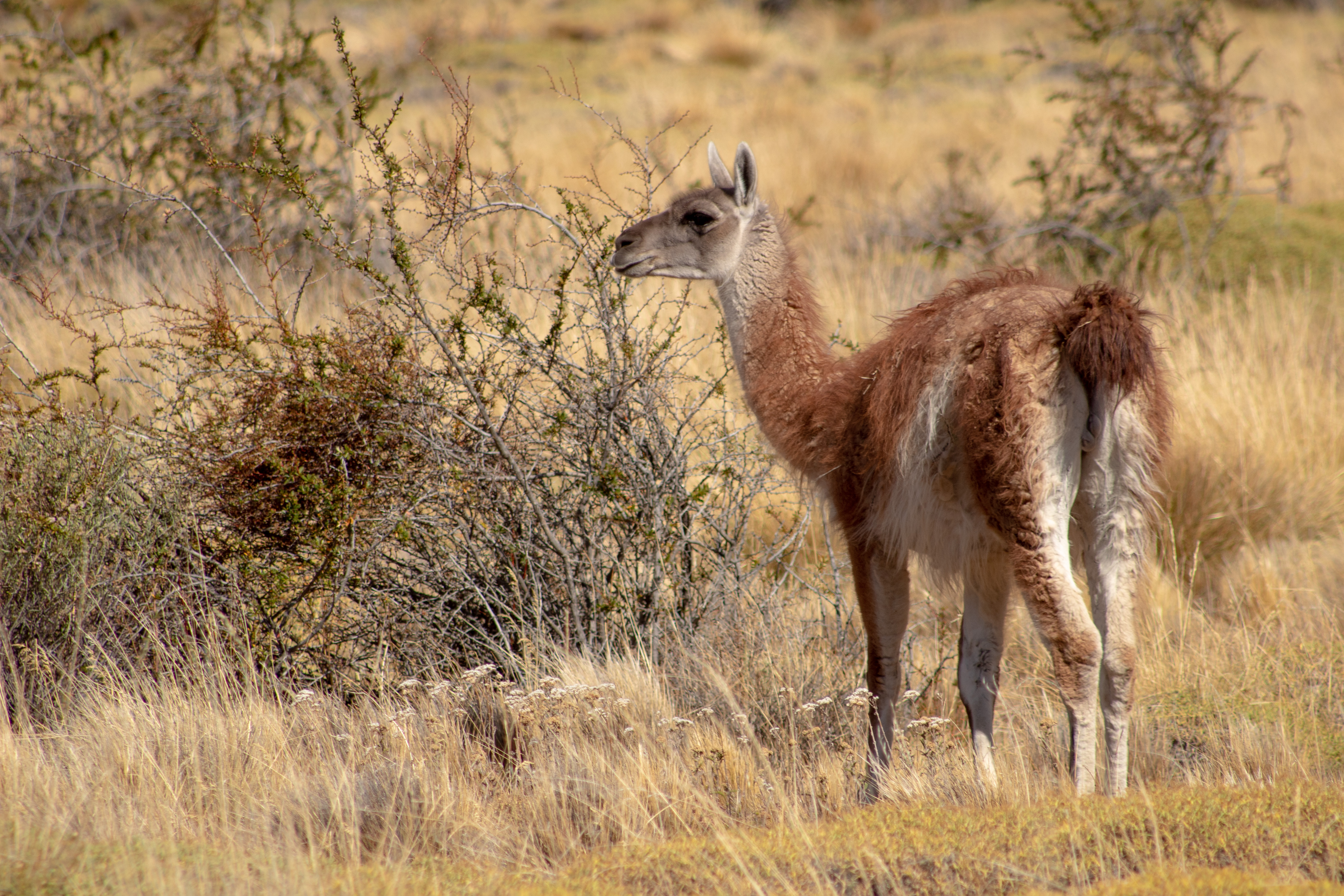
Camelids inhabiting semi-arid plains, such as this Lama guanicoe, would have been favoured prey items and habitat for several southern species of Arctotherium.

A. bonariense, A. tarijense and A. vetustum appeared during the Bonaerian phase of the Lujanian (400kya - 130kya), in what is referred to as the Megatherium americanum biozone.

A. tarijense competed against Smilodon populator, giant jaguars (Panthera onca mesembrina), pumas, Lycalopex, Cerdocyon, Conepatus, Didelphis, and Dusicyon avus in Late Pleistocene Argentina. A. tarijense's prey weight limit peaked at 300 kg, leaving the (subadult and younger) mega-mammals, such as the gomphotheres, giant ground sloths, and toxodontids, to Smilodon populator and giant jaguars. Smilodon fatalis, Arctotherium bonariense, Canis nehringi, maned wolves, and humans would have also joined this predator guild at various stages of the Lujanian.

==== Patagonia ====
Only A. tarijense has been recovered from Patagonia, with localities currently only from the Late Pleistocene of Chile. Carnivory likely peaked in the southernmost range of A. tarijense, with scavenging likely providing an important feeding strategy in the resource-scarce sub-polar region. The paleoenvironment has been broadly reconstructed as an open steppe with occasional Nothofagus woodland, with A. tarijenese competing against Smilodon populator and Panthera onca mesembrina.

=== Paleo-ecological reconstructions ===
Although mostly herbivorous, the modern spectacled bear is on occasion an active predator. The spectacled bear has several hunting techniques- principally, the bear surprises or overpowers its prey, mounts its back, and consumes the immobilised animal while still alive, pinning the prey with its weight, large paws and long claws. Alternatively, the bear pursues the prey into rough terrain, hillsides, or precipices, provoking its fall and/or death. After death, the prey is dragged to a safe place (usually a nest over a tree, or a forested area) and consumed, leaving only skeletal remains. These behaviours have been suggested as Arctotherium's hunting strategies as well. However, although the spectacled bear is capable of climbing trees, Arctotherium is thought to be non-arboreal.

=== Interaction with humans ===
The remains of A. wingei in the Hoyo Negro of the Yucatán appear to be in association with human remains.

== Extinction ==
The last known records of Arctotherium are an ambiguous find of A. bonariense from Uruguay (cf./aff, either ~36,900 or ~14,485 BP of the Sopas Formation, A. tarijense at ~12,255 cal. BP in the Cueva Del Puma, (Patagonia) Chile, and A. wingei at ~13,140 cal. BP in the Sistema Sac Actun (Yucatán), Mexico, with a possible record of 9,000 BP in Muaco, Venezuela.

Globally, in the Quaternary Extinction Event, extinction favoured 'conservative morphologies' in ursid body plans, such as those found in the spectacled bear. For example, the more specialised teeth of Arctotherium could have limited its diet more than the contemporary spectacled bear, and thus have made Arctotherium more vulnerable to extinction.
