= Morenelaphus =

Morenelaphus Temporal range: Pleistocene (Ensenadan-Lujanian) ~0.77–0.012 Ma

Scientific classification
- Kingdom: Animalia
- Phylum: Chordata
- Class: Mammalia
- Order: Artiodactyla
- Family: Cervidae
- Subfamily: Capreolinae
- Genus: †Morenelaphus; Carette, 1922

Type species
- †Cervus brachyceros Gervais & Ameghino, 1880

Species
- †M. brachyceros (Gervais & Ameghino, 1880); †M. lujanensis (Ameghino, 1888)

Extinct genus of deer

Morenelaphus is an extinct genus of capreoline deer that lived in South America during the Pleistocene epoch (Ensenadan-Lujanian faunal stages), ranging from the Pampas to southern Bolivia and Northeast Brazil. The genus contains two named species, Morenelaphus brachyceros and Morenelaphus lujanensis. It was a large deer, with some specimens estimated to exceed 200 kilograms in body mass. The antlers were over 70 cm in length, and are superficially similar those of deer belonging to the subfamily Cervinae, like red deer. Fossils of the genus have been recovered from the Agua Blanca, Fortín Tres Pozos and Luján Formations of Argentina, the Ñuapua Formation of Bolivia, Santa Vitória do Palmar in southern Brazil, Paraguay and the Sopas Formation of Uruguay.

The earliest possible fossil record of Morenelaphus is known from the Miramar Formation, dated to the Ensenadan faunal stage (corresponding to Early-Middle Pleistocene). Dental microwear analysis suggests Morenelaphus had a mixed-feeder diet, including grass and perhaps with the occasional ingestion of gritstone. It went extinct during the Pleistocene-Holocene transition, around 12,000 years ago, possibly as a result of climate change and nutritional stress.
