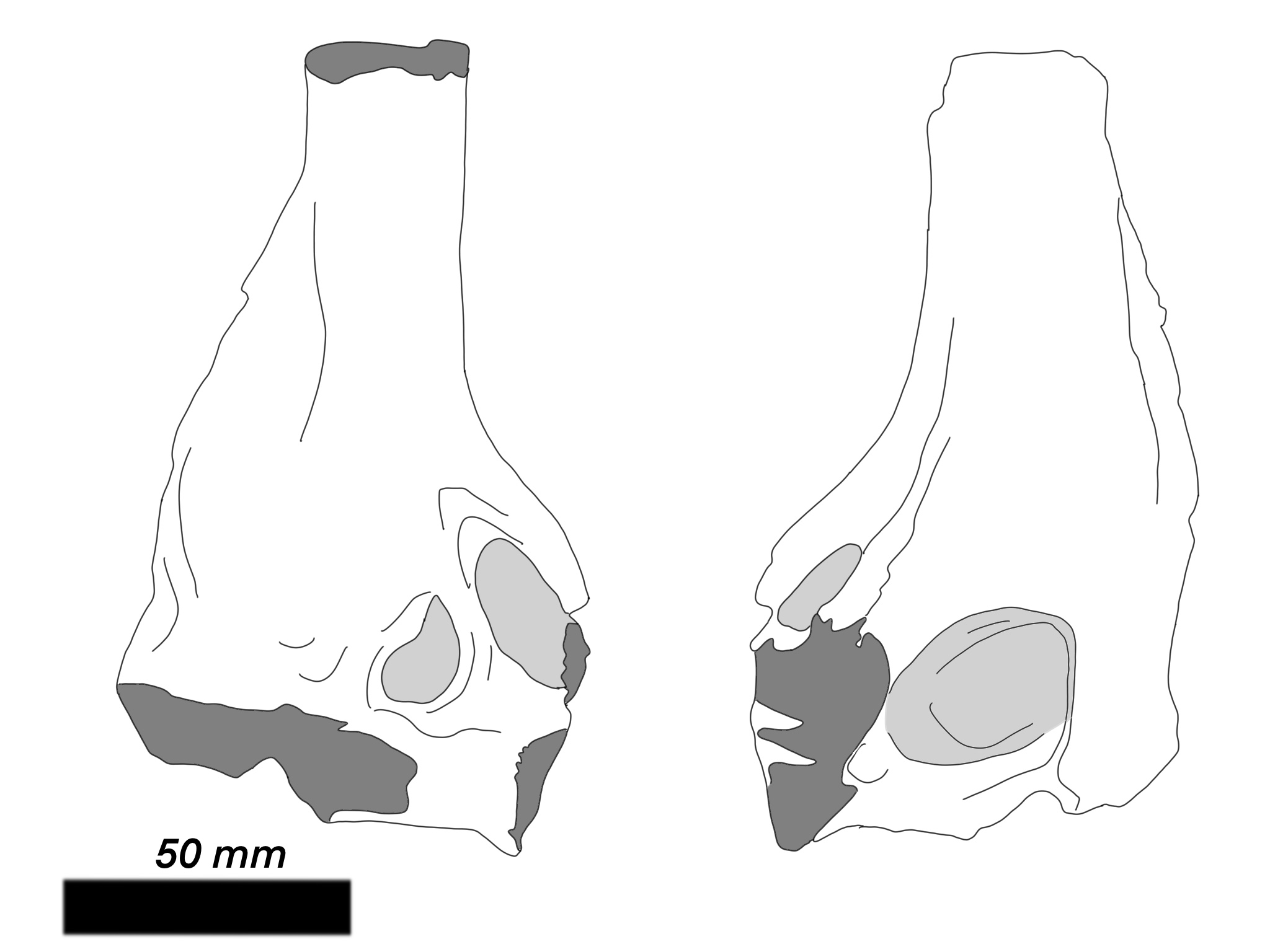
- Holotype humerus in anterior and posterior views.

Scientific classification
- Kingdom: Animalia
- Phylum: Chordata
- Class: Mammalia
- Order: Carnivora
- Family: Felidae
- Subfamily: Pantherinae
- Genus: Panthera
- Species: †P. balamoides

Binomial name
- †Panthera balamoides Stinnesbeck et al., 2019

= Panthera balamoides =

Panthera balamoides Temporal range: Late Pleistocene (Rancholabrean)

Extinct species of carnivore

Panthera balamoides ("similar to jaguar") is a possibly dubious species described as an extinct species of the big cat genus Panthera that is known from a single fossil found in a Late Pleistocene (Rancholabrean NALMA, dated to 13,000 BP) age cenote in the Yucatan Peninsula, Mexico. P. balamoides has only a single reported specimen, the distal end of a right humerus (upper arm bone), that is notably of exceptional size for a felid. It was unearthed in 2012 from an underwater cave and described in 2019 by an international group of paleontologists from Mexico and Germany led by Sarah R. Stinnesbeck. However, several authors have since proposed the humerus represents that of a bear, possibly the extinct Arctotherium, and not a cat.

== Discovery ==
Fossils attributed to Panthera balamoides were first unearthed from a debris mount in El Pit cenote, a submerged sinkhole in a diving and snorkel park known as Dos Ojos on the Yucatán Peninsula. This site is located near Tulum in Quintana Roo, Mexico, dating to the Rancholabrean stage of the Late Pleistocene of around 13,000 BP, in which several other fossils were unearthed such as two human individuals and other felids like Smilodon and Panthera atrox. The fossils had been discovered and collected in 2012 via diving by Jerónimo Avilés Olguín, a paleontologist from the Museo del Desierto, from around 44 meters (144 ft) down in the cenote. The fossils later attributed to P. balamoides are fragmentary, consisting only of the distal end of a humerus (upper arm bone) that was later taken and dried in the Colección Paleontológica de Coahuila of the Museo del Desierto in Saltillo, Mexico.

The specimen, desposited under specimen number CPC-2205, remained undescribed until 2018. That year, a team of researchers from Germany and Mexico led by Sarah R. Stinnesbeck described the remains in addition to clavicles from Panthera atrox and a distal humerus of Smilodon gracilis. CPC-2205 was made the holotype of a novel species named Panthera balamoides, the specific name coming from "balam", the Mayan word for "jaguar" due to the discovery of the remains in former Mayan territory, and "eidos" from the Greek root for "similarity". The name calls upon the supposed likeness of the distal humerus' morphology to that of the extant jaguar.

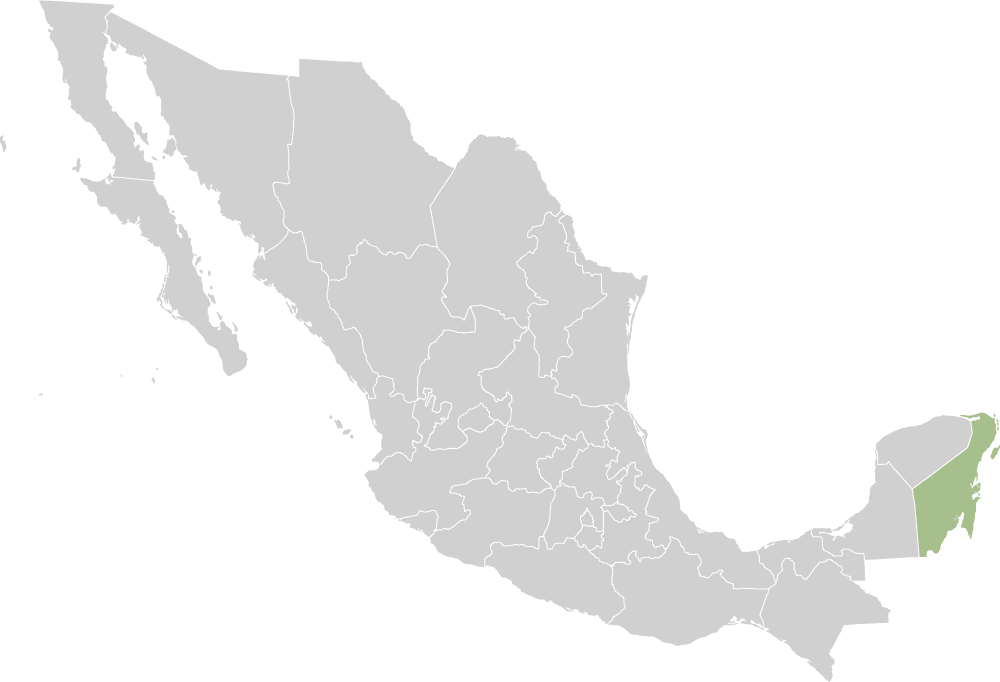
Map of Mexico, with Quintana Roo highlighted in green.

== Description ==
Depending on the phylogenetic position of the species, it have either been a very large and robust pantherine similar to jaguars or a ginormous omnivorous ursid like Arctotherium. If P. balamoides is a Panthera species, it may have been over 100 kilograms (220 lb) in weight despite its build more akin to smaller felids such as jaguars and ocelots. This would make P. balamoides one of the largest known carnivorans, around the weight of modern Asiatic bears and jaguars. If a specimen of Arctotherium, it would be from the smaller species A. wingei based on the discovery of nearby remains. A. wingei has been estimated to have been closer to 83 kilograms (183 lb).

=== Humerus ===
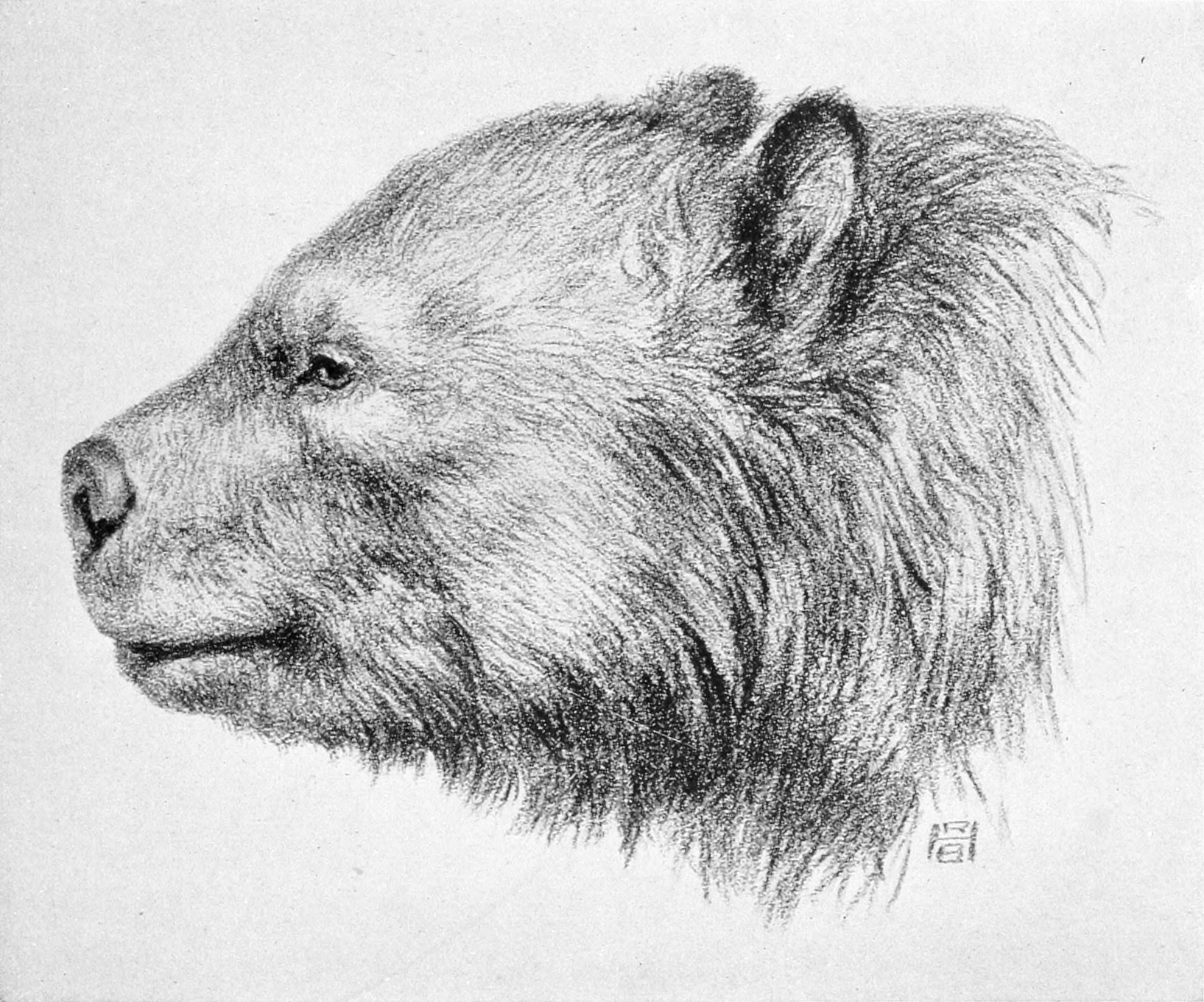
Portrait of the bear Arctotherium, which P. balamoides may be a synonym of.

The holotype consists purely of the distal third of the right humerus (upper arm bone), with a preserved length of 136 millimetres (5.4 in) and maximum width of 81 millimetres (3.2 in). The humeral shaft is gracile and straight, attached to a prominent lateral supracondylar ridge with a distal thickness and a laterally convex ridge runs along the distal half of the shaft. Here, the m. bracialis muscle would contact the bone next to the m. triceps brachii. There is a crescent-shaped concave depression proximal to the articlar surfaces that would be a muscle attachment. There is an offset distal articular surface (joint) that longs along the axis of the humeral shaft medially. The epticondylar foramen is prominent and visible from the front and backsides, a trait used by the authors to diagnose the fossil. The coronoid fossa (a small depression) is shallow and located on the anterior face of the epiphysis (end of a long bone) adjacent to the distal articular surface, with an abraded capitulum and trochlea, the parts of the humerus that articulate with the ulna and radius.

The olecranon fossa (depression that articulates with the radius) is located proximal to the distal articlular surface, with a height and weight of around 30 millimetres (1.2 in) making a triangular shape. This fossa was under the attachment of the m. anconeus muscle, making a firm and robust accessory point. These traits of the humerus suggests P. balamoides had robust and short, akin to that of extant jaguars. A combination of these characteristics were used to diagnose the species by Stinnesbeck et al. (2019), but have come into question by other authors who theorize the humerus is not distinct from that of Arctotherium.

== Classification ==
In the initial description of P. balamoides, it was decided by the authors that the partial humerus of the holotype could not have been canid or ursid due to the presence of an entepicondylar foramen, which is absent in the two groups with the exception of tremarctine bears like Tremarctos. Other traits like the size and outline of the foramen as well as the distribution of Tremarctos led the authors to favor a placement in Felidae. The humerus preserves a combination of pantherine and machairodontine features, such as the entepicondylar foramen's shape though it is over twice as large as that of Smilodon's. This foramen is missing from humeri of Smilodon populator, leading the authors to speculate that P. balamoides was a pantherine. This, in addition to characteristics like the olecranon fossa's outline and size of the supracondylar process, convinced Stinnesbeck et al. (2019) to put the species in Panthera. They did note, however, that additional material was required to make a solid phylogenetic assessment.

However, a 2019 study on Yucatán carnivorans suggested that Panthera balamoides may actually be misidentified remains of Arctotherium (a tremarctine bear), whose remains have also been found in Yucatán. If so, this would explain the unusual robustness of the bone and render Panthera balamoides an invalid species. The idea of a felid Panthera balamoides has not been repeated in literature, with a study on Mexican jaguar fossils also considering P. balamoides to be an ursid based on morphological characteristics and mentioned by several other works. A 2023 study also agreed that P. balamoides has nothing in common with Panthera, and that it is morphologically similar to Arctotherium.

== Paleoecology ==
Based on the thickness of the cortical bone in the humerus, it was hypothesized by Stinnesbeck et al. that P. balamoides had powerful forelimbs akin to Smilodon that could be used for wrestling its prey. This has been theorized to have reduced the range of humeral abduction and greatened the amount of lateral rotation, indicating an arboreal (climbing) lifestyle. The greater ability of movement in the forelimbs made activities like short-distance running, jumping, climbing, and wrestling possible, an unusual trait for such a large animal. This is in contrast to other pantherines, which bear a thicker cortical bone for a more pursuit-predator lifestyle. The olecranon fossa is short and shallow, suggesting a larger degree of elbow and arm extension was capable, a trait beneficial to arboreal animals. Several other characteristics of the humerus support the idea of arboreal or scansorial habits, features that led Stinnesbeck et al. to suggest that P. balamoides was an accelerator and competent jumper with the ability to climb tall rocks. This is more similar to smaller felines like jaguars, ocelots, and jaguarundis instead of larger pantherines. The arboreal habits may have led P. balamoides to occupy more dense habitats rather than the open habitats which featured cursorial felids like Homotherium, Panthera atrox, and Smilodon.

P. balamoides is known from a single site in the Yucatán dating to the Rancholabrean NALMA (North American Land Mammal Age) from around 13,000 BP, this being at the end of the Pleistocene and reign of many megafauna groups in the Americas. The areas around El Pit cenote likely had large open steppes separating the more densely forested shrubs on the Yucatán savannahs, explaining why a mix of cursorial and arboreal animal fossils have been collected from the locality. The El Pit cenote is one of several cenotes known from the Pleistocene Yucatán, with the Hoyo Negro system that is also submerged being very fossil productive. This includes fossils of humans, the gomphothere proboscidean Cuvieronius, ground sloths Nohochichak and two species of Xibalbaonyx, large canid Protocyon, other fossil felids Panthera atrox and Smilodon in addition to the extant Puma and Lynx, procyonid Nasua, tayassuid Pecari, tapir Tapirus bairdii, and the giant ursid Arctotherium. It was postulated by Stinnesbeck et al. (2019) that P. balamoides used the caves for water as the densely forested environments it inhabited were devoid of drinking spots.
