= Ensenadan =

Period of geologic time (1.95–0.4 Ma) during the Early and Middle Pleistocene

The Ensenadan age is a period of geologic time (1.95 Ma – 0.4 Ma) in the Early Pleistocene and Middle Pleistocene epochs of the Quaternary used more specifically with South American Land Mammal Ages.

== Provenance ==
The type locality originates in the town of Ensenada, near the city of La Plata (Buenos Aires Province), Argentina. Charles Darwin originally described these Ensenadan age sediments as part of the "Pampean formation" in 1863. The Ensenadan age is particularly recognized from the Pampas of Argentina (especially from the provinces of Buenos Aires, Cordoba, Entre Rios, La Pampa, and Santa Fe). Sites sharing geological and paleoenvironmental conditions come from Bolivia, southern Brazil and Paraguay to the north, to southern Patagonia and Tierra del Fuego in the south. Excluding the glaciated regions of Patagonia, Ensenadan continental units stretch over 2 million km². Important Ensenadan age formations in the modern Pampas come from the Ensenada and Miramar formations, along with section of the Vorohué and San Andrés formations near Mar del Plata.

== Chronology ==
The Ensenadan age follows the Marplatan age and precedes the Lujanian age. The core of the Ensenadan faunal stage contains the magnetic polarity events subchron C1r1n (0.98 Ma) and the Brunhes–Matuyama reversal (0.78 Ma). The upper limit of the Ensenadan senso lato is tentatively placed at the beginning of MIS 11 (ca. 0.4 Ma), while the lower limit may extend up to the Olduvai polarity event (subchron C2n, between 1.95 Ma and 1.77 Ma) as per faunistic evidence. The Ensenadan age has also been described as spanning between the earliest Early Pleistocene (Olduvai event), to the Early Middle Pleistocene (either ca. 2Ma - 0.5 Ma, or 1.8 Ma - 0.4 Ma). The upper limit of the Ensenadan has been repeatedly revised from 0.7 Ma, 0.65 Ma and 0.5 Ma, with a "Belgranian" stage bridging the end of the Ensenadan and the beginning of the Bonaerian substage of the Lujanian. However, more recent research instead provides an approximate boundary between the Ensenadan and Lujanian, with the Lujanian beginning at least 0.3 Ma.

== Climate ==
The Ensenadan was predominately composed of cold & arid or semiarid climates, interspersed with brief warmer and more humid pulses. There were over 15 glacial-interglacial cycles during the Ensenadan, with glaciation events taking placed along the Patagonian and Fuegian Andes. Generally, glacial events during the Ensenadan correspond with pre-Illinoian glaciations of North America.

The most significant glacial event during the Ensenadan was the "Great Patagonian Glaciation" (GPG), which occurred ca. 1 Ma. The GPG caused a significant cold-arid pulse with corresponding changes to the environment and faunal distribution & composition of the Pampas, with the associated sea level changes increasing the continentality of the local climate. Two more minor glacial events occurred after the GPG; the first was part of a global cooling event (0.8 Ma - 0.5 Ma), with the second pulse concluding the Ensenadan age at 0.4 Ma. Consequently, the Ensenadan largely consisted of open & dry environments with a probably colder climate than today, as suggested by faunal records. For example, climate records from Uruguay note significant arid periods, contrasting with today's mild and very humid climate. The subsequent Bonaerian substage of the Lujanian begins with a warm event, which continued for most of that substage.

== Fauna ==
=== Biozone ===
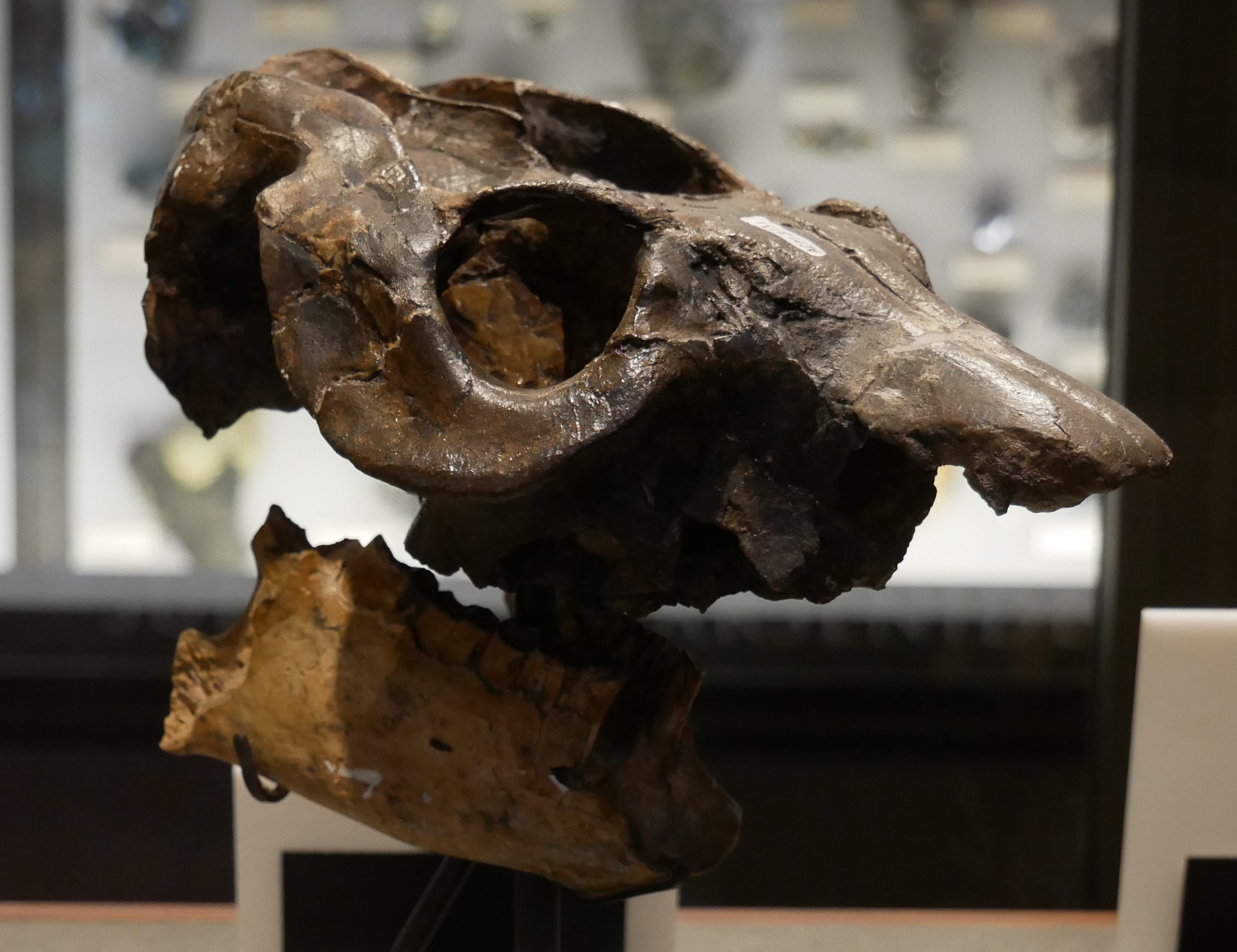
Skull of Mesotherium cristatum, the primary index fossil for the Ensenadan age.

The Ensenadan age is directly correlated with the Mesotherium cristatum biozone. Other index fossils include Arctotherium angustidens, Catagonus metropolitanus, Eutatus pasquali, Glyptodon munizi, Megatherium gallardoi, Neosclerocalyptus (N. pseudornatus & N.ornatus), Panochthus intermedius, Scelidotherium bravardi, and Theriodictis platensis, as well as possibly Pseudoseisura cursor. However, the presence of Mesotherium and Glyptodon cf. munizi in Lujanian sediments (along with other overlapping index fossils) suggests a revision of index fossils is required using new dating controls.

Over 50% of the 16 present xenarthran species (13 cingulate species and 3 sloths) were exclusive to the Ensenadan faunal stage. There was a notable increase in xenarthran diversity (especially Dasypodidae and Glyptodontidae), and a decrease in native ungulates (Litopterna & Notoungulata). As many as 29 xenarthan species appeared in the Ensenadan, due to a probable increase in temperatures and expansion in grasslands and other open biomes. The Ensenadan age appears to host the highest proportion of mammals adapted to open and arid environments, with taxa from the modern Central Pampas and Patagonia (e.g. Lestodelphys halli, Microcavia australis, Tolypeutes matacus, Tympanoctomys cordubensis) expanding their respective ranges.

=== Great American Biotic Interchange ===
The Ensenadan faunal stage saw the intensification of the Great American Biotic Interchange (GABI), with the first records of Nearctic origin fauna such as deer, tapir, proboscideans, cats, bears, and mustelids in South America. Notably, large Ensenadan carnivores defined this second phase of GABI, suddenly joining the pre-existing community of Nearctic origin medium-sized carnivores (e.g. Dusicyon and Galictis) which were first recorded in Vorohuean sediments (Late Pliocene - Early Pleistocene). These large predators include canids ("Canis" gezi, Protocyon (P. scagliorum & P. troglodytes), Theriodictis platensis), felids (Panthera onca, Puma concolor, Smilodon populator), and the giant short-faced bear Arctotherium angustidens.

=== Gigantism ===
The Ensenadan age experienced a proliferation of megaherbivores (>1000 kg), such as Doedicurus, Glyptodon, Lestodon, Macraucheniopsis, Megatherium, Notiomastodon, Panochthus and Toxodon. Additionally, many xenarthrans (Eutatus pascuali, Panochthus intermedius, Panocthus subintermedius, Glyptodon munizi, Megatherium gallardoi) along with Toxodon 'ensenadensis' and Notiomastodon platensis were larger in the Ensenadan age than in proceeding Lujanian. After the Ensenadan, the significant changes in mammal communities included the reduction of body size in megafaunal genera; in the case of Panocthus, Bergmann's rule has been suggested to be responsible for increased size, although this has been disputed.

=== Middle-Late Ensenadan faunal turnover ===
Commencing in between the Great Patagonian Glaciation (1.168 Ma - 1.016 Ma) and a subsequent glaciation event (0.8 Ma - 0.5 Ma), the late Ensenadan (0.98 Ma - 0.4 Ma) oversaw a major faunal turnover event induced by the aridification of the climate. In Baradero (Ensenada Formation) and San Pedro of Buenos Aires province, there was a significant increase in volcanic glass and subsequent loessic sedimentation near the Brunhes–Matuyama reversal (0.78 Ma), which are both indicators of increased aridity and colder climatic conditions. Fauna characteristic of warm and humid environments (e.g. Calomys, Echimyidae, Procyonidae and Tapiridae), which were present in the early and middle Ensenadan disappear, with fauna typical of more xeric environments (e.g. Lestodelphys, Microcavia, Reithrodon, Tolypeutes, Tympanoctomys (T. barrerae, T. cordubensis), and Zaedyus) becoming predominant in Mar del Plata (Miramar Formation), Ramallo and other localities in the Buenos Aires province. Regarding megafauna, circa 1 Ma also records Lama guanicoe at the Toscas del Río de La Plata locality, along with the first ever records of Arctotherium angustidens. The progressive specialization of Neosclerocalyptus to arid climates, and its subsequent regional proliferation further evidences the aridification of the Pampas in the late Ensenadan. However, in the higher altitudes of Tarija (Bolivia), the opposite process may have occurred, with warmer and more humid conditions in the late Ensenadan.

=== Late Ensenadan extinctions ===
At the end of the Ensenadan age, various members of the carnivore guild became extinct. These include some canids ("Canis" gezi, Dusicyon ensenadensis, Protocyon scagliarum, Theriodictis), the giant short-faced bear (Arctotherium angustidens), mustelids (e.g. Galictis henningi, Lyncodon bosei, Stipanicicia), and the last member of the giant procyonids (Cyonasua merani). However, these were replaced by equivalent forms of canids, mephitids, mustelids and short-faced bears in the proceeding Lujanian age, which also subsequently diversified. While the Lujanian was also dominated by grasslands and steppes, conditions were probably drier and cooler.
