= Burrow fossil =

Trace fossil

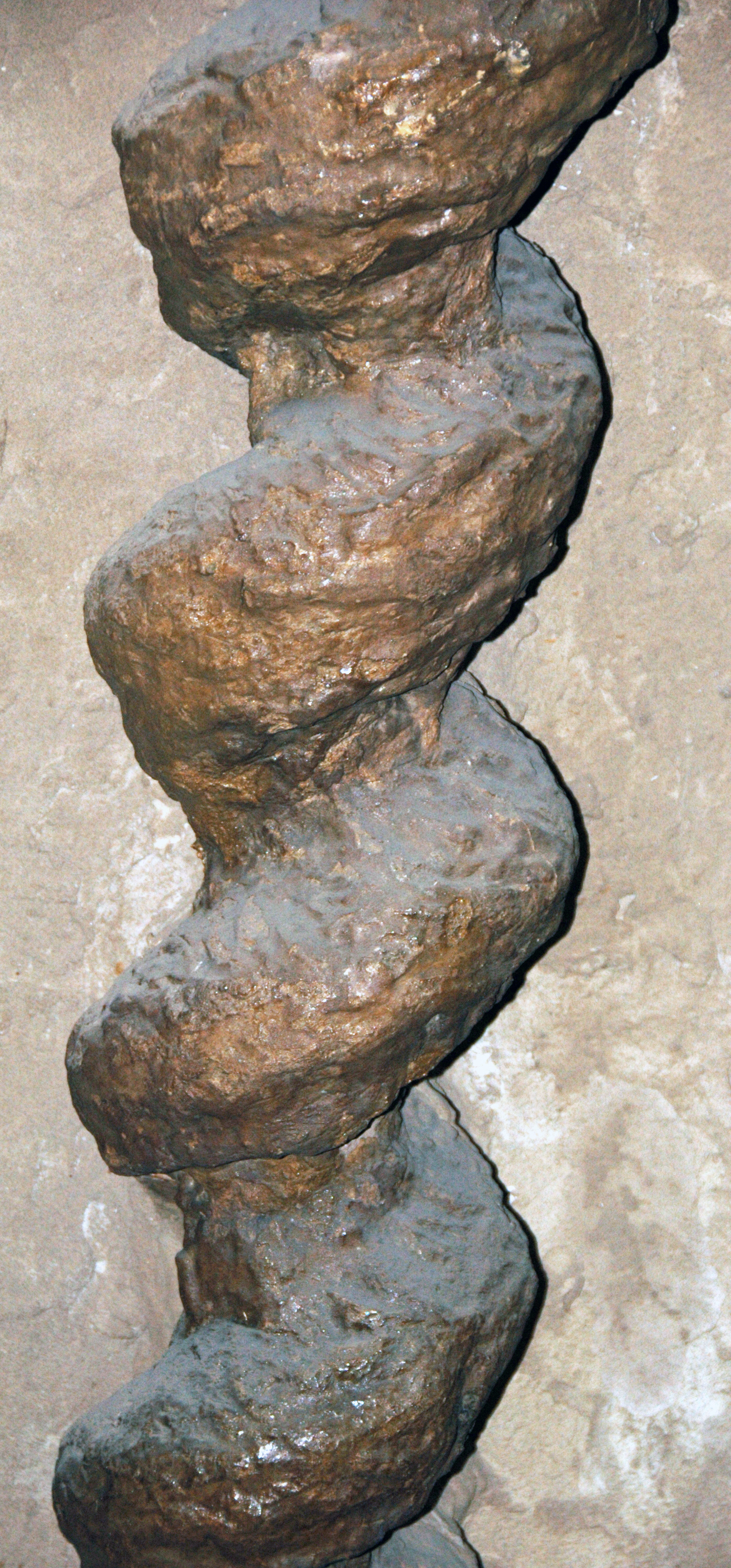
A fossil burrow of the Palaeocastor beaver.

Burrow fossils are the remains of burrows - holes or tunnels excavated into the ground or seafloor - by animals to create a space suitable for habitation, temporary refuge, or as a byproduct of locomotion preserved in the rock record. Because burrow fossils represent the preserved byproducts of behavior rather than physical remains, they are considered a kind of trace fossil. One common kind of burrow fossil is known as Skolithos, and the similar Trypanites, Ophiomorpha and Diplocraterion.

== Vertebrate burrows ==
=== Fish burrows ===
Fossil Lungfish burrows are preserved in the Rocky Point Member of the Chinle Formation in Canyonlands National Park.

== Invertebrate burrows ==
Examples are Treptichnus pedum and Arenicolites franconicus.

== See also ==
- Paleoburrow
- Trace fossil - a fossil record of biological activity but not the preserved remains of the plant or animal itself.
