= Paleoburrow =

Underground shelter excavated by prehistoric megafauna

A paleoburrow is an underground shelter excavated by extinct paleo-vertebrate megafauna that lived in the prehistoric era. Most paleoburrows are likely made by giant armadillos, pampatheres, and/or large ground sloths, depending on their size. Thousands of examples have been identified across South America, mostly in the Brazilian states of Santa Catarina and Rio Grande do Sul.

The first paleoburrow was discovered in Rondonia by Amilcar Adamy in 2010. Paleoburrows, often exposed by development, are threatened by construction and degradation from rain and the elements. Researchers from several Brazilian universities have formed the Paleoburrows Project (Portuguese: Projeto Paleotoca) to raise awareness about their existence, and fight misinformation.

== Description ==
Thousands of sites characterized as paleoburrows have been found across South America, such as in Ponta do Abunã, in Rondônia, within the Amazon region, in the Serra do Gandarela National Park, in Minas Gerais, in Monte Bonito, the southern Rio Grande, as well as the Toca do Tatu in Santa Catarina.

After the extinction of the megafauna about 10,000 years ago, some paleoburrows were reused by indigenous human populations. Recent searches indicate that these structures were used as temporary shelters as well as for ritual purposes. In the interior of some paleoburrows, researchers discovered stone tools, ceramic artifacts, human burials, and inscriptions engraved on the walls.

Paleoburrows are classified as paleontological sites; however, if the remains of ancient populations are also found, the site may become the object of research for both paleontologists and archaeologists.

Paleoburrows dug by giant ground sloths often have large claw marks along the walls. Many paleoburrows are exposed by local development, but subsequently destroyed by rain, the elements, or construction.

Paleoburrows are sometimes enlarged by erosion. One of the largest reaches 2,000 feet in length over all of its branching tunnels, originally over 6 feet tall and 3 to 5 feet wide. It was made by many animals over generations.

The exact animals which dug the largest burrows, up to 5 feet in diameter, are debated. One group of scientists, including Heinrich Frank, believe that they were dug by giant ground sloths, possibly Catonyx, Glossotherium, or Lestodon. Another group believes that even the largest burrows are attributable to extinct armadillos and/or pampatheres like Pampatherium, Holmesina or Propraopus, even though they were smaller than the sloths.

It is unclear why the burrows were dug to their large sizes. Whether the burrows were dug by giant armadillos or giant sloths, they are much larger than would be necessary.

== Crotovina ==
Paleoburrows filled with sediments, deposited over the centuries through rainfall and accumulated due to the porosity of the terrain, are called crotovina. Generally, fossils found in crotovinas exhibit large proportions similar to known megafauna of their geological period.

== See also ==
- Burrow fossil
