= Tolomosa Formation =

Geologic formation in Bolivia

- Stratigraphic range: Early-Middle Pleistocene 2.58–0.7 Ma
- Type: Formation

Lithology
- Primary: Siltstone, sandstone

Location
- Coordinates: 21.5°S 64.75°E
- Approximate paleocoordinates: 21.6°S 64.2°E
- Country: Bolivia

Type section
- Named for: Tarija

The Tolomosa Formation, formerly known as the Tarija Formation, is a Pleistocene-age geologic formation found near Tarija, Bolivia.

== Background ==
Fossils of numerous large herbivorous mammals have been discovered, including toxodonts like Toxodon platensis, glyptodonts, ground sloths, and litopterns such as Macrauchenia patachonica. Numerous carnivorous mammals have been found, including Smilodon populator, Arctotherium tarijense, and Protocyon tarijensis. The uppermost portion of the formation is dated to the earliest Middle Pleistocene, dated to approximately 0.76±0.03 Ma and 0.72± 0.12 M based on Uranium–lead dating and helium dating respectively.

== Paleofauna ==
=== Birds ===
==== Accipitriformes ====
Accipitriformes
Genus	Species	Family	Interval	Notes
Vultur	V. gryphus	Cathartidae	Tarija	Andean Condor

=== Didelphimorphia ===
Accipitriformes
Genus	Species	Family	Interval	Notes
Lutreolina	L. crassicaudata	Didelphidae	Tarija	Big lutrine opossum

=== Cingulata ===
Cingulata
Genus	Species	Family	Interval	Notes	
Euphractus	E. sexcinctus	Chlamyphoridae	Tarija <Tarija	Six-Banded Armadillo	
Chaetophractus	C. villosus	Chlamyphoridae	Tarija	Big Hairy Armadillo	
Dasypus	D. tarijensis	Dasypodidae	Tarija		
Propraopus	P. cf. sulcatus	Dasypodidae	Tarija		
Glyptodon	G. reticulatus	Glyptodontidae	Tarija		Glyptodon life restoration
Panochthus	P. sp	Glyptodontidae	Tarija		
Pampatherium	P. cf. humboldtii	Pampatheriidae	Tarija		

=== Proboscidea ===
Proboscidea
Genus	Species	Family	Interval	Notes	Images
Cuvieronius	C. tropicus	Gomphotheriidae	Tarija		Cuvieronius hyodon

=== Carnivorans ===
Carnivora
Genus	Species	Family	Interval	Notes	
Pseudalopex	P. gymnocercus	Canidae	Tarija	Pampas Fox	
Aenocyon	A.dirus	Canidae	Tarija	Dire wolf	
Chrysocyon	C. brachyurus	Canidae	Tarija	Maned wolf	
Protocyon	P.troglodytes	Canidae	Tarija		
Nasua	N.sp	Procyonidae	Tarija		A modern Nasua
Arctotherium	A. angustidens	Ursidae	Tarija		
Arctotherium	A. tarijense	Ursidae	Tarija		
Arctotherium	A. wingei	Ursidae	Tarija		
Conepatus	C.suffocans	Mephitidae	Tarija	An extinct hog-nosed skunk	
Smilodon	S.populator	Felidae	Tarija	Saber-toothed cat	Restoration of the smilodon
Panthera	P. onca	Felidae	Tarija	Jaguar	Jaguar (Panthera onca) swimming
Herpailurus	H. yagouaroundi	Felidae	Tarija	Jaguarundi	

=== Artiodactyla ===
Artiodactyla
Genus	Species	Family	Interval	Notes	Images
Platygonus	P. tarijensis.	Tayassuidae	Tarija		
Charitoceros	C. tarijensis.	Cervidae	Tarija		
Hippocamelus	H. incognituss.	Cervidae	Tarija		A Huemul, a living member of Hippocampus
Paleolama	P. weddeli.	Camelidae	Tarija	Paleolama.	
Lama	L. provicugna	Camelidae	Tarija	The Vicuña, a modern species of Llama	Group of vicuña in Arequipa Region, Peru

=== Meridiungulata ===
South American native ungulates
Genus	Species	Family	Interval	Notes	Images
Macrauchenia	M. patachonica.	Macraucheniidae	Tarija		Reconstruction of Macrauchenia patachonica running.
Toxodon	T cf. platensis.	Toxodontidae	Tarija		Toxodon, London Natural History Museum

=== Perissodactyla ===
Perissodactyla
Genus	Species	Family	Interval	Notes	Images
Tapirus	T. tarijensis	Tapiridae	Tarija		
Hippidion	H. principale	Equidae	Tarija	A browsing horse	Onohippidium reconstruction
Hippidion	H. devillei	Equidae	Tarija		
Equus	E. neogeus	Equidae	Tarija		
