= Burrow =

Underground animal home dug in soft dirt

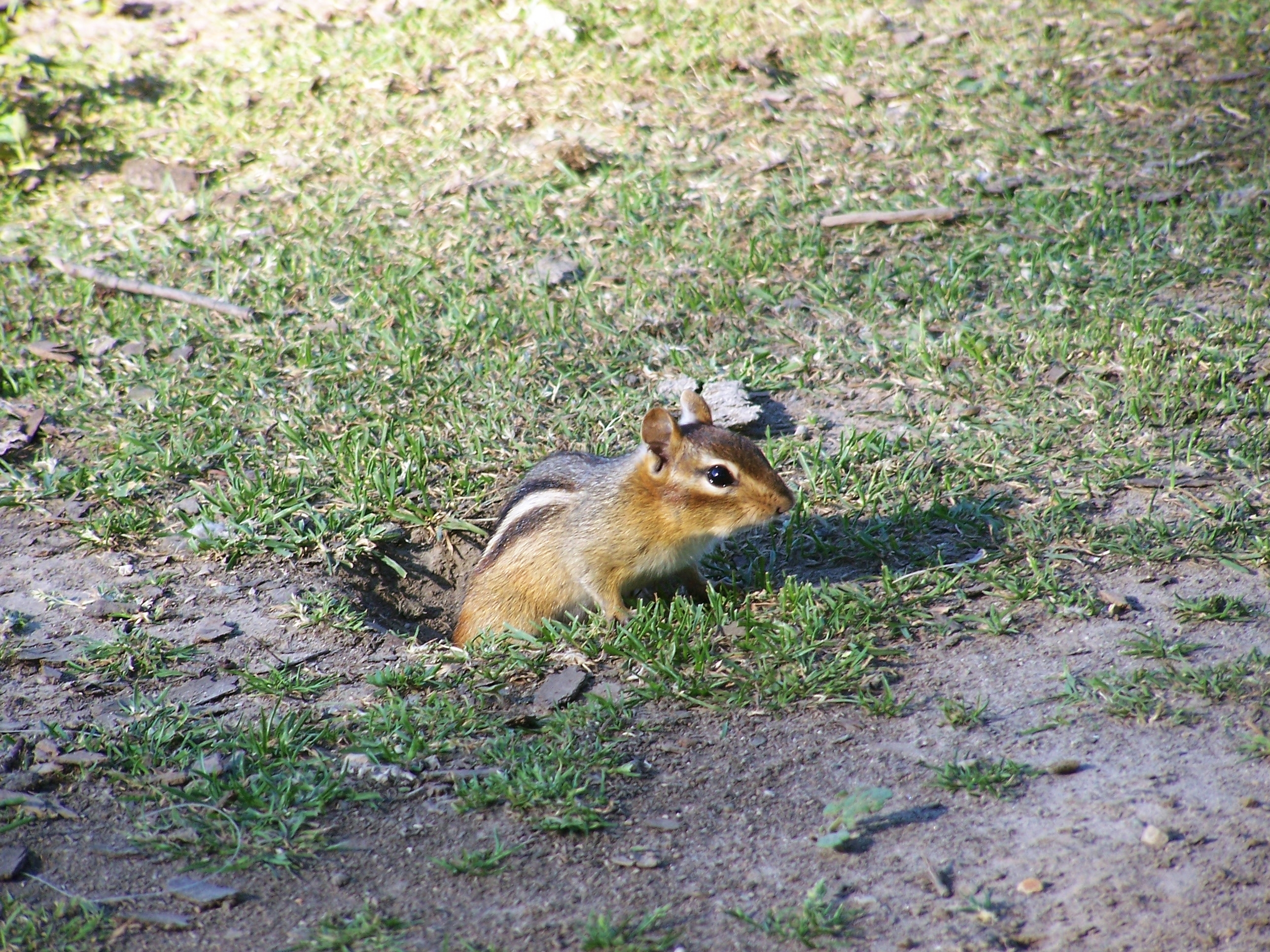
An eastern chipmunk at the entrance of its burrow

A burrow is a hole or tunnel excavated into the ground by an animal to construct a space suitable for habitation or temporary refuge, or as a byproduct of locomotion. Burrows provide a form of shelter against predation and exposure to the elements, and can be found in nearly every biome and among various biological interaction types, including symbiosis and competition. Many animal species are known to form burrows. These species range from small amphipods, to very large vertebrate species such as the polar bear. Burrows can be constructed into a wide variety of substrates and can range in complexity from a simple tube a few centimeters long to a complex network of interconnecting tunnels and chambers hundreds or thousands of meters in total length; an example of the latter level of complexity, a well-developed burrow, would be a rabbit warren.

== Vertebrate burrows ==
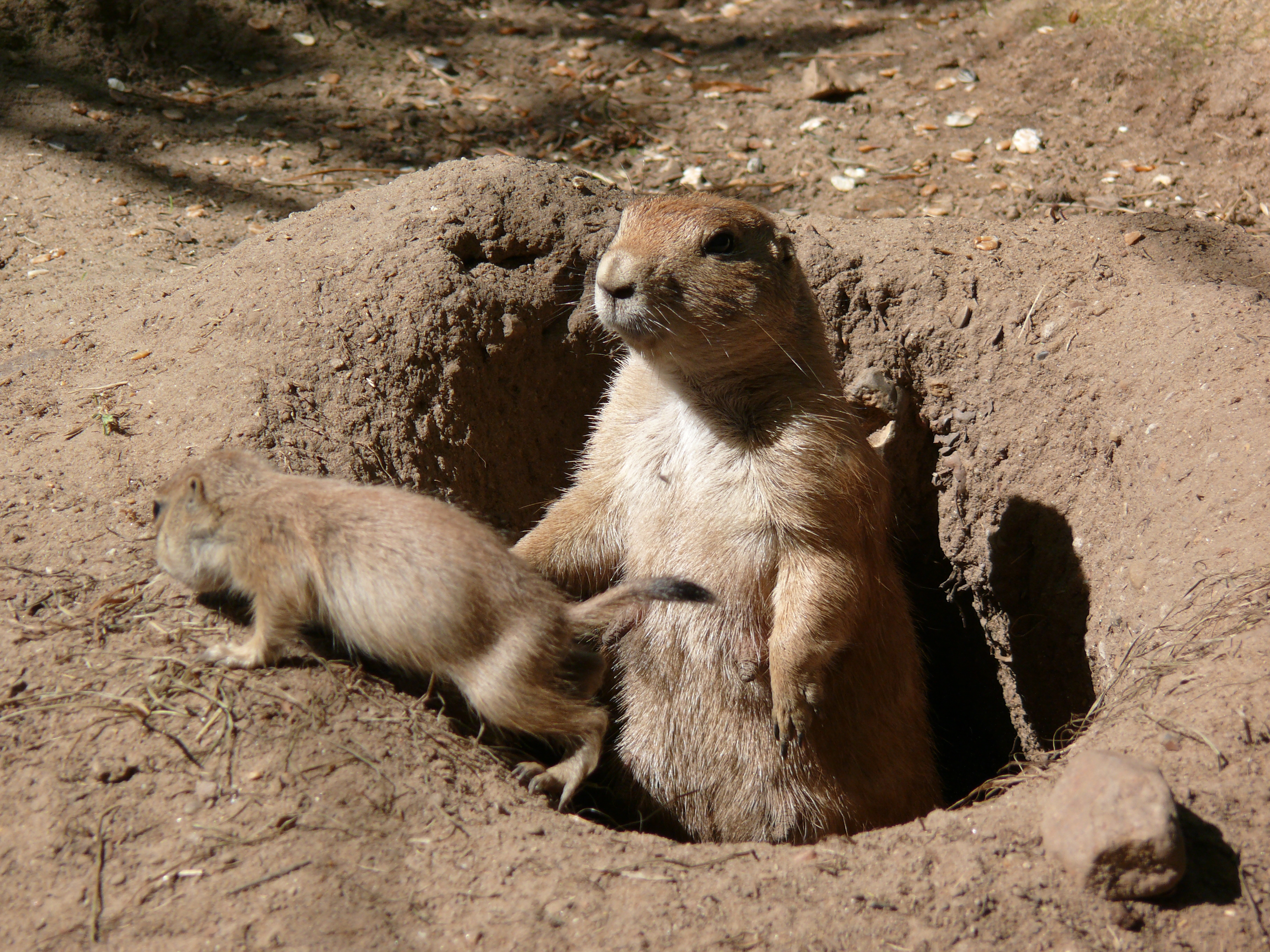
A black-tailed prairie dog, with young, emerges from its burrow

A large variety of vertebrates construct or use burrows in many types of substrate; burrows can range widely in complexity. Some examples of vertebrate burrowing animals include a number of mammals, amphibians, fish (dragonet and lungfish), reptiles, and birds (including small dinosaurs). Mammals are perhaps most well known for burrowing. Mammal species such as Insectivora like the mole, and rodents like the gopher, great gerbil and groundhog are often found to form burrows. Some other mammals that are known to burrow are the platypus, pangolin, pygmy rabbit, armadillo, rat and weasel. Some rabbits, members of the family Leporidae, are well-known burrowers. Some species, such as the groundhog, can construct burrows that occupy a full cubic metre, displacing about 300 kilograms (660 lb) of dirt. There is evidence that rodents may construct the most complex burrows of all vertebrate burrowing species. For example, great gerbils live in family groups in extensive burrows, which can be seen on satellite images. Even the unoccupied burrows can remain visible in the landscape for years. The burrows are distributed regularly, although the occupied burrows appear to be clustered in space. Even Carnivora like the meerkat, and marsupials, such as wombats are burrowers. Wombat burrows are large and some have been mapped using a drone. The largest burrowing animal is probably the polar bear when it makes its maternity den in snow or earth. Lizards are also known to construct and live in burrows, and may exhibit territorial behaviour over the burrows as well. There is also evidence that a burrow provides protection for the Adelaide pygmy blue-tongue skink (Tiliqua adelaidensis) when fighting, as they may fight from inside their burrows.

Burrows by birds are usually made in soft soils; some penguins and other pelagic seabirds are noted for such burrows. The Magellanic penguin is an example, constructing burrows along coastal Patagonian regions of Chile and Argentina. Other burrowing birds are puffins, kingfishers, and bee-eaters.

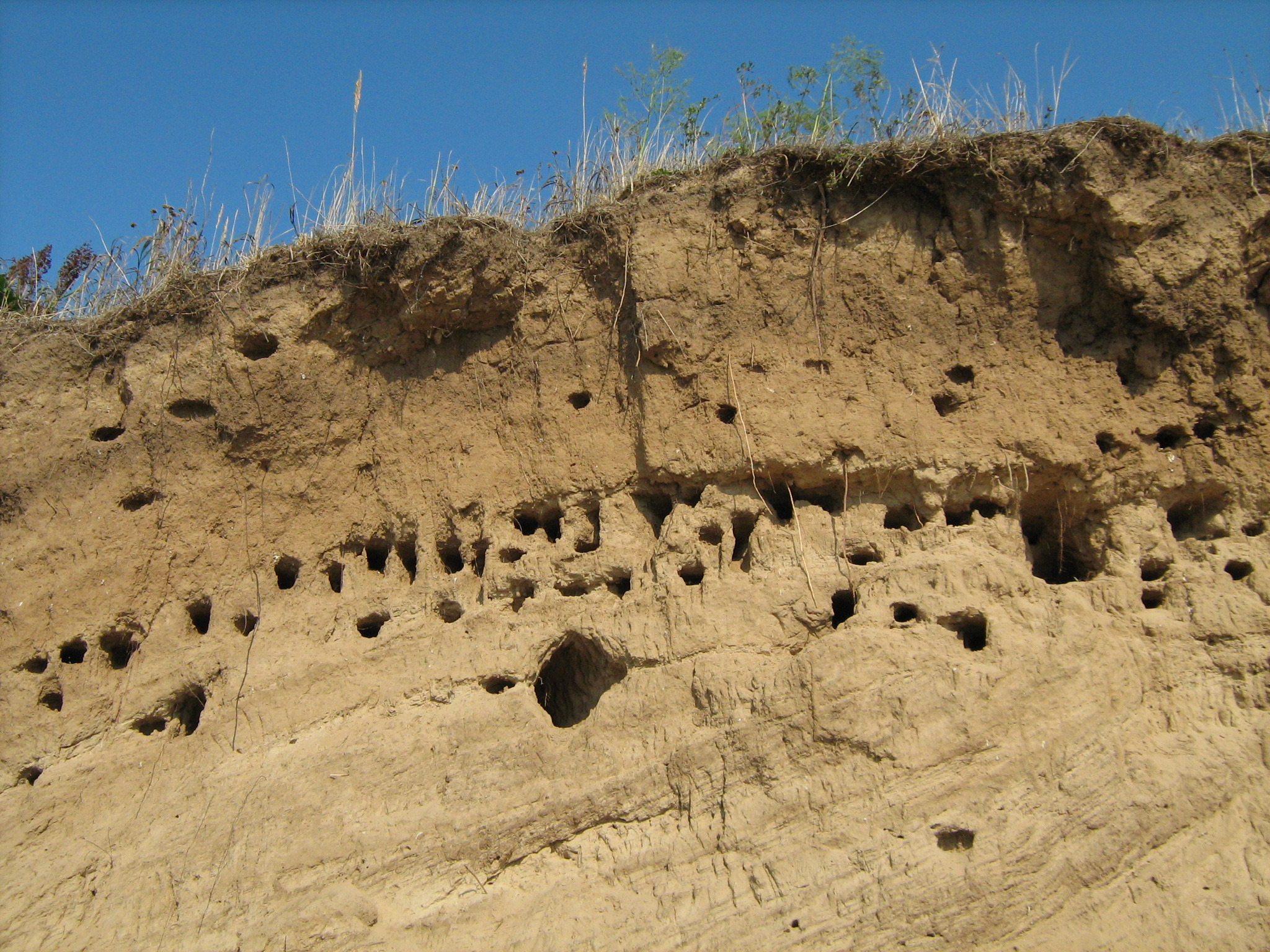
Bird burrows on the Volga shore near Kstovo, Russia

Kangaroo mice construct burrows in fine sand.

== Invertebrate burrows ==
Scabies mites construct their burrows in the skin of the infested animal or human. Termites and some wasps construct burrows in the soil and wood. Some ants construct burrows in the soil to house their colonies. Some sea urchins and clams can burrow into rock.

The burrows produced by invertebrate animals can be filled actively or passively. Dwelling burrows which remain open during the occupation by an organism are filled passively, by gravity rather than by the organism. Actively filled burrows, on the other hand, are filled with material by the burrowing organism itself.

The establishment of an invertebrate burrow often involves the soaking of surrounding sediment in mucus to prevent collapse and to seal off water flow.

Examples of burrowing invertebrates are insects, spiders, sea urchins, crustaceans, clams and worms.

== Excavators, modifiers, and occupants ==
Burrowing animals can be divided into three categories: primary excavators, secondary modifiers and simple occupants. Primary excavators are the animals that originally dig and construct the burrow, and are generally very strong. Some animals considered to be primary excavators are the prairie dog, aardvark and wombat. Pygmy gerbils are an example of secondary modifiers, as they do not build an original burrow, but will live inside a burrow made by other animals and improve or change some aspects of the burrow for their own purpose. The third category, simple occupants, neither build nor modify the burrow but simply live inside or use it for their own purpose. Some species of birds make use of burrows built by tortoises, which is an example of simple occupancy. These animals can also be referred to as commensals.

== Protection ==
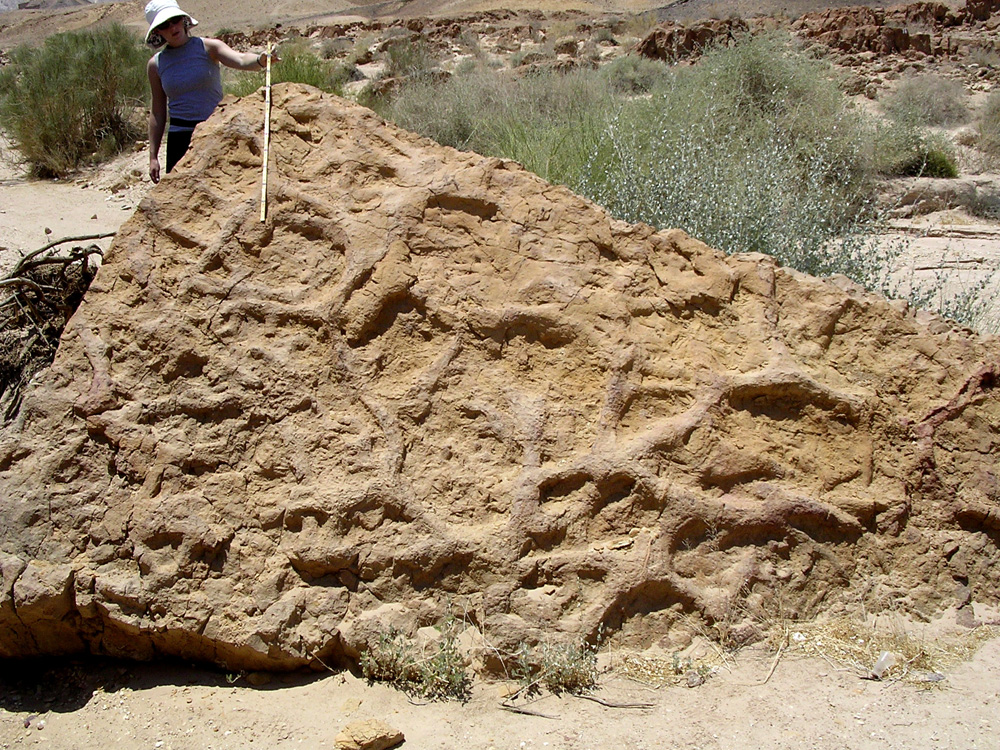
Crustacean burrows in a Jurassic limestone, southern Israel

Some species may spend the majority of their days inside a burrow, indicating it must have good conditions and provide some benefit to the animal. Burrows may be used by certain species as protection from harsh conditions, or from predators. Burrows may be found facing the direction of sunlight or away from the direction of cold wind. This could help with heat retention and insulation, providing protection from temperatures and conditions outside. Insects such as the earwig may construct burrows to live in during the winter, and use them for physical protection. Some species will also use burrows to store and protect food. This provides a benefit to the animal as it can keep food away from other competition. It also allows the animal to keep a good stock of food inside the burrow to avoid extreme weather conditions or seasons where certain food sources may be unavailable. Additionally, burrows can protect animals that have just had their young, providing good conditions and safety for vulnerable newborn animals. Burrows may also provide shelter to animals residing in areas frequently destroyed by fire, as animals deep underground in a burrow may be kept safe and at a stable temperature.

== Fossil burrows ==
Burrows are also commonly preserved in the fossil record as burrow fossils, a type of trace fossil.

== See also ==
- Holt
- Maternity den
- Sett - a network of badger tunnels.
- Spreite
- Subterranean fauna
