= Lujanian =

South American age 0.4–0.011 million years ago

The Lujanian age is a South American land mammal age within the Pleistocene and Holocene epochs of the Quaternary, from 0.4–0.011 Ma or 400–11 kya.

== Chronology ==
The Lujanian age follows the Ensenadan age, and precedes the Platan age. The age is usually divided into the middle Pleistocene Bonaerian substage, which ends at about 130,000 years, and the Lujanian 'sensus stricto' substage, which lasts from about 130,000 years into the early Holocene. As the approximate boundary between the Ensenadan and Lujanian has been historically undetermined, a "Belgranian" stage has been used to bridge the two faunal stages, although more recent research does not support this. The Lujanian age overlaps chronologically with the North American Irvingtonian and Rancholabrean faunal stages.

== Bonaerian ==
Variably categorized as either a substage of the Lujanian age or a separate age of its own, the Bonaerian ('Bonarian') substage coincides with the Megatherium americanum biozone. The base of the Bonaerian also co-records the Ctenomys kraglievichi biozone from the southern Pampean region.

This substage begins with a warm event, which continued for most of the Bonaerian. A faunal turnover happened in between the Bonaerian and the preceding Ensenadan age, which saw the replacement and diversification of several carnivoran taxa. These include various new species of short-faced bear (Arctotherium), mustelids (e.g. Galictis cuja, Lyncodon patagonicus, Eira, Pteronura), canids (Dusicyon avus), procyonids (e.g. Nasua, Procyon), and mephitids (e.g. Conepatus semistriatus, Conepatus humboldtii).

== Lujanian 'sensus stricto' ==
The Lujanian substage is characterized by the Equus (Amerhippus) neogeus biozone.
