= El Breal de Orocual tar pits =

Asphalt deposit containing fossils

The El Breal de Orocual tar pits is the largest asphalt deposit in the world, being over 37,000 meters deep and approximately 18,500 square meters. The locality is also a fossil deposit, dating to the Pliocene and Early Pleistocene (3 Ma – 2.5 Ma). El Breal de Orocual is located in the Piar Municipality, Monagas, Venezuela.

== History ==
El Breal de Orocual was discovered in 2006 during excavations for the installation of an oil pipeline on the outskirts of Maturín by Petróleos de Venezuela, S.A. (PDVSA), when workers noticed animals remains in a remarkable state of preservation, which temporarily halted work in the area.

Following this report, the site was excavated by the Venezuelan Institute for Scientific Research (led by Venezuelan paleontologist Ascanio Rincón), which was sponsored by PDVSA. Their initial findings were presented at the 67th meeting of the Society of Vertebrate Paleontology in 2007, with over 34 megafaunal taxa were described.

== Notable fossils ==
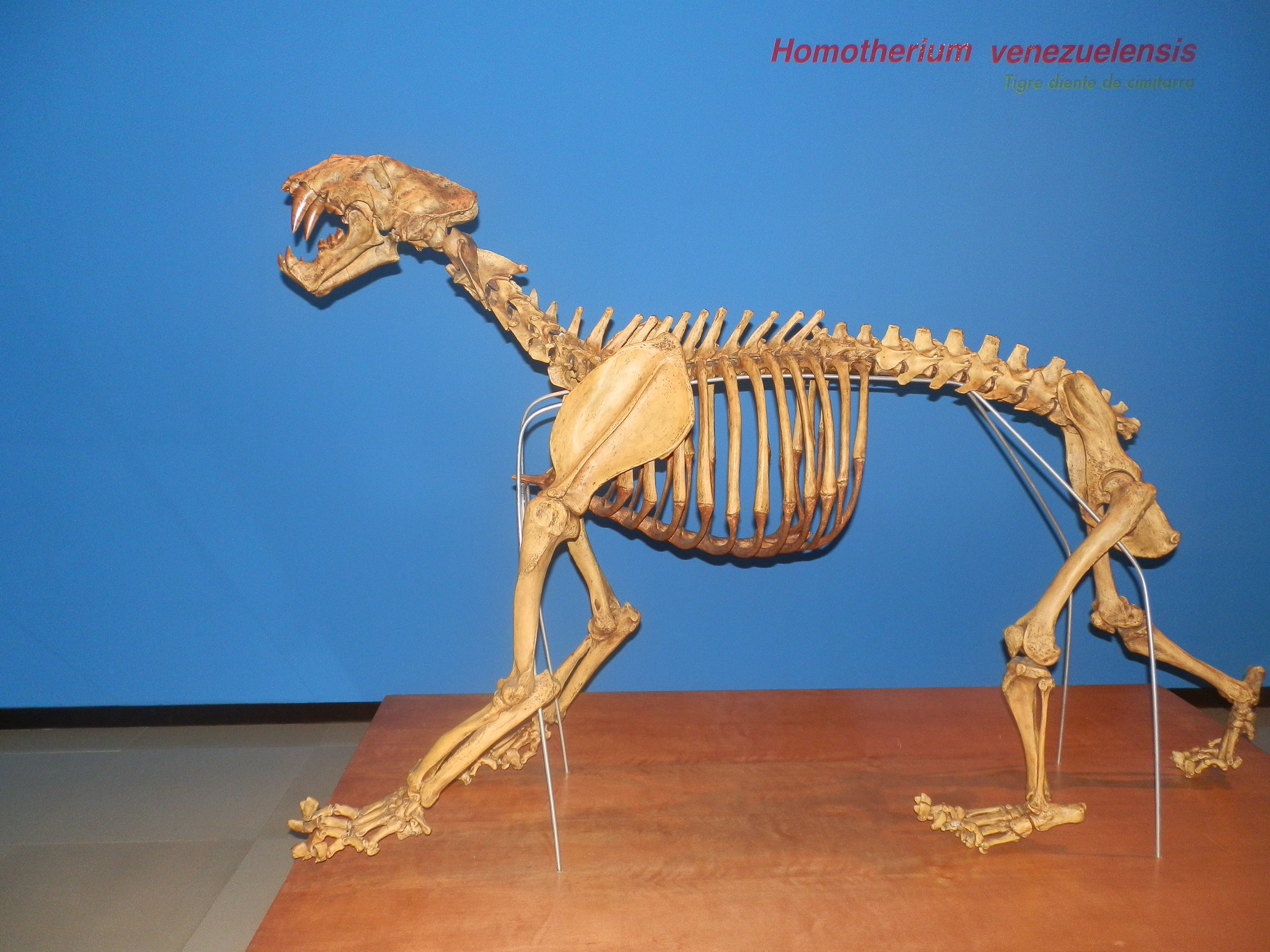
Complete skeleton of the type species of scimitar cat (Homotherium venezuelensis)

A diverse array of fossils species were recovered from El Breal de Orocual, including:

=== Mammals ===
- Felids: Homotherium, the first known machairodont cat from South America (tentatively described as Homotherium venezuelensis).
- Toxodontids: Mixotoxodon larensis.
- Cingulates: Glyptodonts such as Boreostemma venezuelensis and Hoplophorus, the pampatheres Holmesina occidentalis and Pampatherium, the pachyarmatheriid Pachyarmatherium leiseyi and the giant armadillo Propraopus.
- Rodents: New World porcupines.
- Camelids: Palaeolama (P. major, P. orocualis).
- Tapirs: Tapirus (T. orocualis, T. webbi) suggests a semitropical climate.

=== Birds ===
- New World vultures (Cathartidae)
