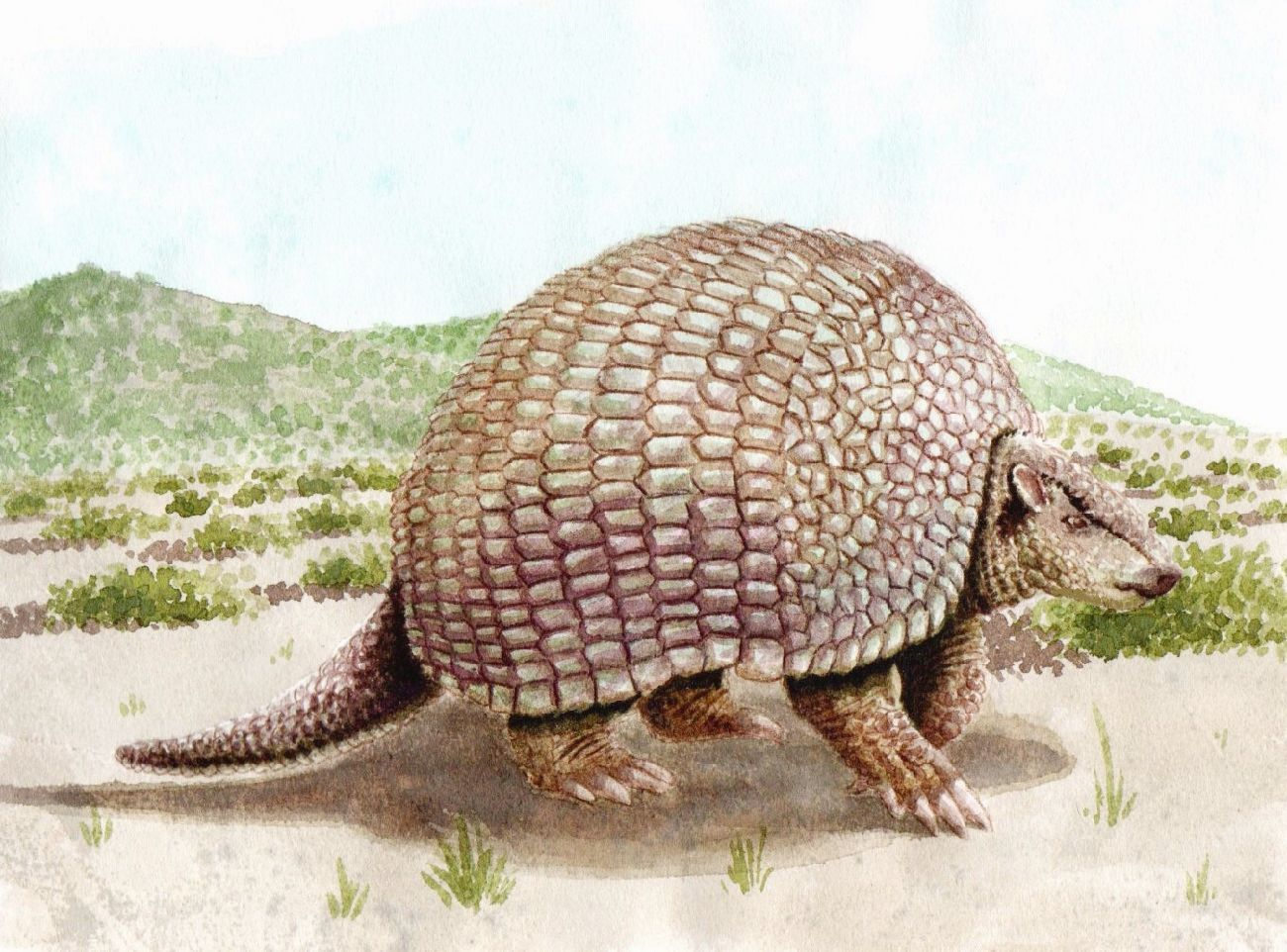

Scientific classification
- Kingdom: Animalia
- Phylum: Chordata
- Class: Mammalia
- Order: Cingulata
- Family: †Pampatheriidae
- Genus: †Pampatherium; Ameghino, 1875

Species
- P. humboldtii Lund, 1839; P. mexicanum Edmund, 1996; P. pygmaeum Ameghino, 1891; P. typum Gervais & Ameghino, 1880

Synonyms
- Genus synonymy: Chlamytherium Lund, 1839; Chlamydotherium Lund, 1841; Species synonymy: P. humboldtii: Chlamytherium humboldtii Lund, 1839; Chlamydotherium humboldtii Lund, 1841

= Pampatherium =

Pampatherium Temporal range: Pleistocene

Extinct genus of mammal

Pampatherium (from the Pampas Plain, and Ancient Greek θηρίον (theríon), meaning "beast") is an extinct genus of xenarthran cingulates that lived in the Americas during the Pleistocene. Some species went extinct right at the Pleistocene-Holocene border.

== Taxonomy ==
Pampatherium was one of the first fossil mammals reported from South America, with Peter Wilhelm Lund initially describing the genus as Chlamytherium in 1839 (then as Chlamydotherium in 1841). Florentino Ameghino erected the genus Pampatherium in 1875.

== Distribution ==
Pampatherium humboldtii and P. typum lived in South America (mostly Brazil) during the Pleistocene, with P. humboldtii surviving into the very Late Pleistocene.

Pampatherium mexicanum was the only North American species, reaching as far north as Sonora, Mexico. It lived during the Rancholabrean.

== Description ==
Pampatherium resembled a very large armadillo. One species, P. humboldtii, weighed up to 209.5 kg (462 lb). Pampatheres generally resembled armadillos, particularly in the shape of it skull, long snout, and the presence of three areas on the carapace (movable bands, scapular and pelvic shields). Among the features that distinguish them from armadillos are their posterior teeth, which are bilobate rather than peg-like. Their endocranial morphology is also similar to glyptodonts.

The osteoderms of Pampatherium have little ornamentation, lack a depressed marginal band, and those from the posterior buckler are mostly rectangular.

Pampatherium is thought to have excavated paleoburrows and would have both fought with and have been preyed upon by Arctotherium angustidens in these dens.
