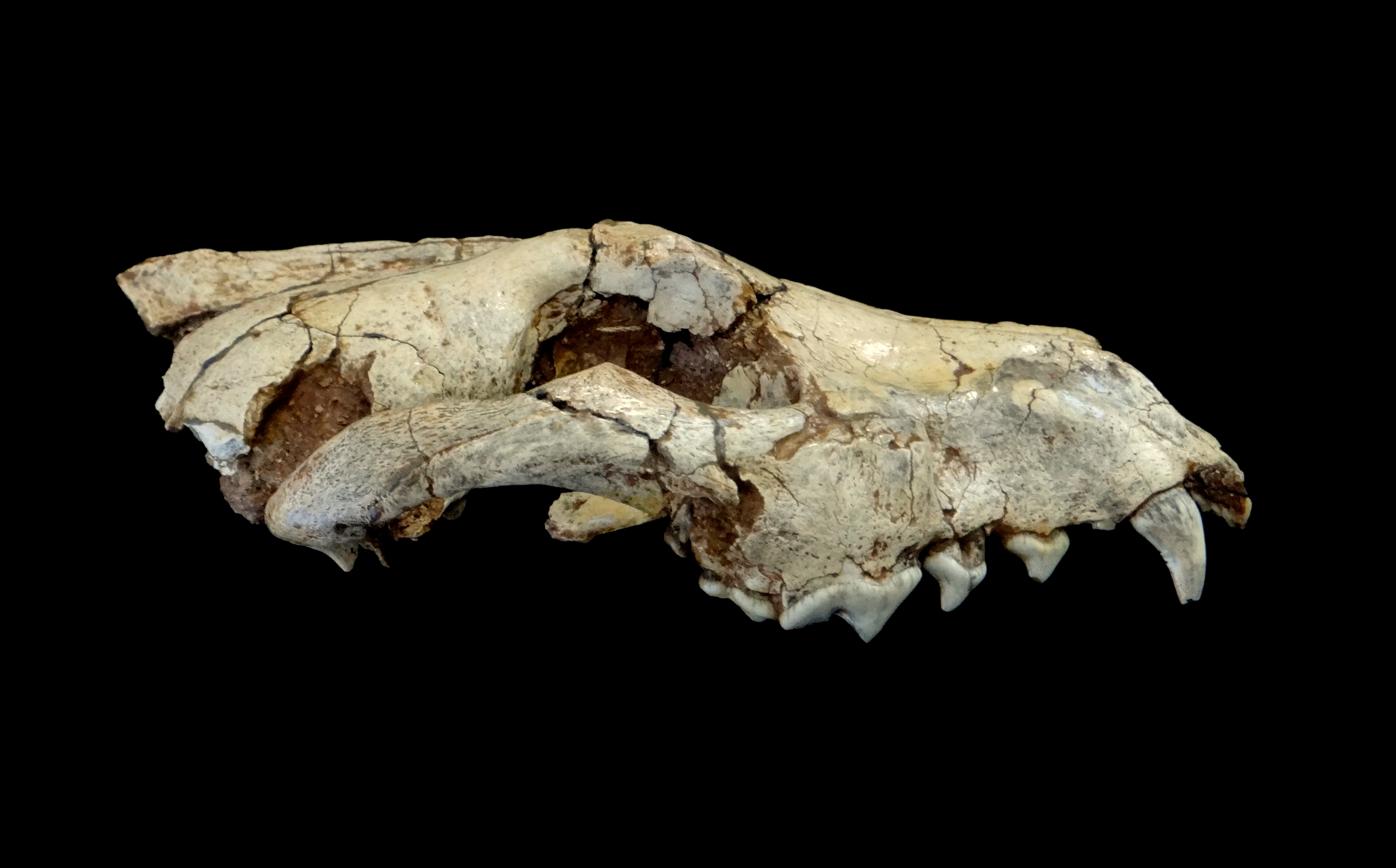
- Protocyon skull

Scientific classification
- Kingdom: Animalia
- Phylum: Chordata
- Class: Mammalia
- Order: Carnivora
- Family: Canidae
- Tribe: Canini
- Subtribe: Cerdocyonina
- Genus: †Protocyon; Giebel, 1855

Type species
- †Canis troglodytes Lund, 1838

Species
- †P. troglodytes (Lund, 1838); †P.? tarijensis (Ameghino, 1902); †P. scagliarum Kraglievich, 1952; †P. orocualensis Ruiz-Ramoni, Wang & Rincón, 2022

Synonyms
- †Theriodictis tarijense? Ameghino, 1902; †P. orcesi Hoffstetter, 1952

= Protocyon =

Protocyon Temporal range: ~2.6–0.02 Ma Late Pliocene - Late Pleistocene

Extinct genus of carnivores

Protocyon (from Greek for "first dog") is an extinct genus of large canid endemic to South and Central America from the Late Pliocene to the Late Pleistocene.

== Description ==
Protocyon was a hypercarnivore, suggested by its dental adaptations. Like many other large canids, it was most likely a pack hunter. It hunted the medium-sized grazers and browsers, and bite marks on fossils suggest that it may have hunted Glyptotherium. The find of a molar tooth found in Santa Vitória do Palmar in Brazil suggests a weight of between 25 and 37 kilograms (55 and 82 pounds) for this particular specimen, modest in size compared to other canids including the dire wolf. However, despite its size, isotopic analysis shows a dietary overlap with Smilodon populator, which implies it competed with the sabertooth cat for the same prey.

== Taxonomy ==
Protocyon was named by Giebel in 1855 and assigned to Canidae by Carroll in 1988. The genus definitively contains P. troglodytes (with its junior synonym P. orcesi) and P. scagliarum. Some researchers propose that the species Theriodictis tarijensis falls under the genus Protocyon. In 2022, Ruiz-Ramoni, Wang & Rincón named a new species from the Late Pliocene-Early Pleistocene strata, P. orocualensis.

Protocyon and Theriodictis are members of the tribe Cerdocyonina, which also includes other South American canids. Within this clade, they have been suggested as close relatives of the bush dog (Speothos venaticus), maned wolf (Chrysocyon brachyurus), and Dusicyon.

== Palaeoecology ==
Isotopic analysis suggests that Protocyon fed on large prey, which may have included Notiomastodon platensis, Megatherium americanum, Toxodon platensis, Hippidion principale, and Equus neogeus. In contrast to its contemporary carnivores S. populator and Arctotherium wingei, dental stable isotope evidence shows P. troglodytes in the Brazilian Intertropical Region (BIR) had a preference for open savanna environments.

=== Bone damage ===
Protocyon has been attributed to bone damage on specimens recovered from Jirau (Eremotherium, Notiomastodon, Glossotherium), Águas de Araxá (Notiomastodon), and possibly La Plata (toxodontid).

== Fossil distribution ==
Fossils of Protocyon have been found in the Ñuapua and Tarija Formations of Bolivia, the Vorohue Formation of Buenos Aires, Argentina, Santa Elena Peninsula of Ecuador, Sopas Formation of Uruguay, Mene de Inciarte Tar Seep of Venezuela and various sites in Brazil, among others the Jandaíra Formation.

Canid fossil material from the Hoyo Negro pit in the Sac Actun cave system (Mexico), initially identified as remains of a coyote, was reinterpreted as remains of P. troglodytes by Schubert et al. (2019), indicating that this taxon was also present in the southern part of North America. The youngest known specimen of P. troglodytes is dated to 20,288-21,139 calibrated BP.
