= Marplatan =

Period of geologic time (3.3–2 Ma) within the Pliocene and Pleistocene epochs

The Marplatan age ('Uquian') is a period of geologic time (3.3–2 Ma) in both the Pliocene and Pleistocene epochs, used specifically within the South American Land Mammal Ages.

== Chronology ==
The Marplatan age follows the Chapadmalalan and precedes the Ensenadan age. The source localities for all three subages (Barranca de los Lobos Formation, Vorohué Formation, San Andrés Formation) come from near Mar del Plata, Buenos Aires Province, Argentina.

== Barrancalobian ==
The Barrancalobian is the first subage of the Marplatan, and is characterized by the Platygonus scagliai biozone. A possible cosmic impact occurred at the start of the Marplatan (3.3Ma) in Argentina.

== Vorohuen ==
The Vorohuen subage contains the Akodon (Akodon) lorenzinii biozone. The first canids (Dusicyon) and mustelids (Galictis) of South America appear in Vorohuen-age sediments of the Pampas.

== Sanandresian ==
The Sanandresian subage concludes the Marplatan, and coincides with the Ctenomys chapalmalensis ('Paractenomys chapadmalensis') biozone. A broadly cold and arid climate began in the Sanandresian, which persisted into the Ensenadan age.
