= Rancholabrean =

North American faunal stage

The Rancholabrean North American Land Mammal Age on the geologic timescale is a North American faunal stage in the North American Land Mammal Ages chronology (NALMA), named after the famed Rancho La Brea fossil site (more commonly known as the La Brea Tar Pits) in Los Angeles, California. The Rancholabrean is characterized by the presence of the genus Bison, which appeared in northwestern North America during the Illinoian (globally known as the Penultimate Glacial Period or Marine Isotope Stage 6) around 190-130,000 years ago, before becoming established across North America during the Sangamonian (globally known as the Last Interglacial) around 130-115,000 years ago. The age of the Rancholabrean is usually considered to overlap the late Middle Pleistocene and Late Pleistocene. The Rancholabrean is preceded by the Irvingtonian NALMA, and it is succeeded by the Holocene (by some workers, specifically the Santarosean NALMA). The Rancholabrean ended around 14–12,000 years ago at the end of the Pleistocene.

On other continents, the Rancholabrean is correlative with the Oldenburgian of the European Land Mammal Ages, and the latter Lujanian of the South American Land Mammal Ages.
