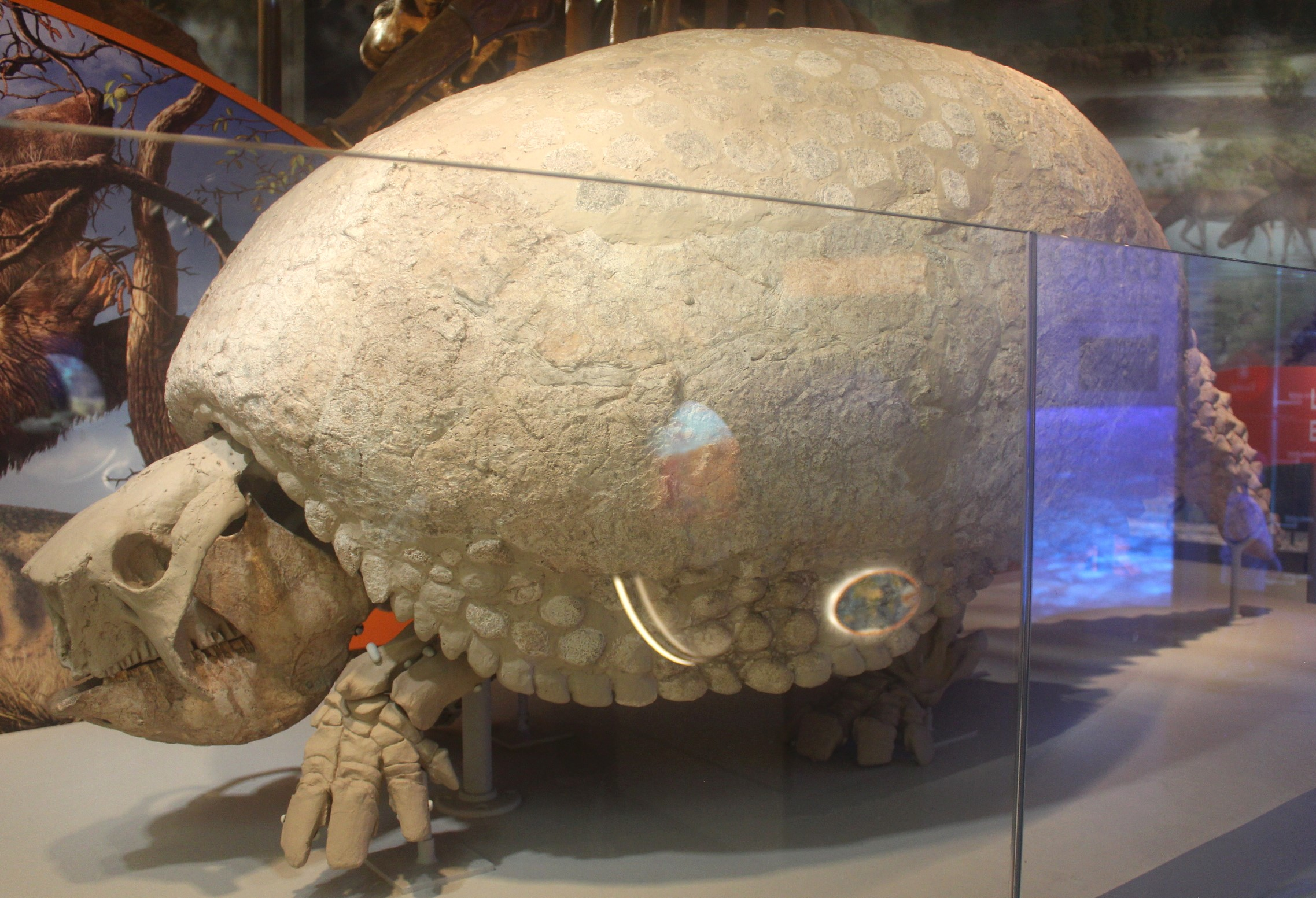
- G. texanum holotype (USNM 10536), National Museum of Natural History

Scientific classification
- Kingdom: Animalia
- Phylum: Chordata
- Class: Mammalia
- Order: Cingulata
- Family: Chlamyphoridae
- Subfamily: †Glyptodontinae
- Genus: †Glyptotherium; Osborn, 1903

Type species
- †Glyptotherium texanum Osborn, 1903

Other species
- † G. cylindricum (Brown, 1912); † G. deuterophractum Oliveira et al., 2026
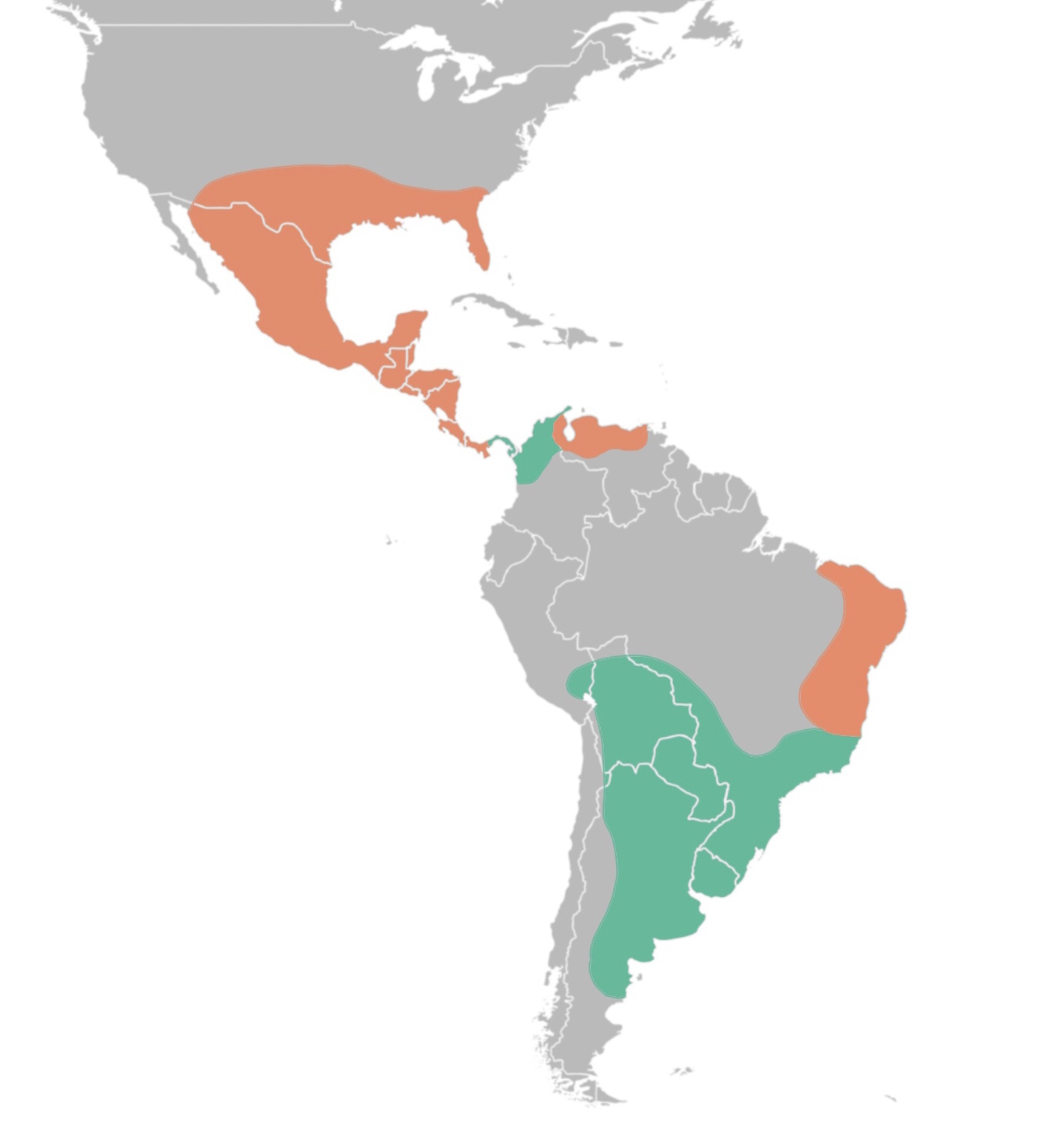
- Distribution of Glyptotherium (orange) compared to Glyptodon's (green).

Synonyms
- Boreostracon Simpson, 1929; Brachyostracon Brown, 1912; Xenoglyptodon Meade, 1953; Synonyms of G. texanum: Glyptotherium arizonae Gidley, 1926; Xenoglyptodon fredericensis Meade, 1953; Glyptodon fredericensis (Meade, 1953); Synonyms of G. cylindricum: Glyptodon mexicanum Cuatáparo and Ramírez, 1875; Glyptodon nathorsti Felix and Lenk, 1875; Glyptodon petaliferus Cope, 1888; Brachyostracon cylindricum Brown, 1912; Brachyostracon mexicanum (Cuatáparo and Ramírez, 1875); Glyptodon rivipacis Hay, 1923; Boreostracon floridanus Simpson, 1929; Glyptotherium floridanum Simpson, 1929; Glyptotherium mexicanum (Cuatáparo and Ramírez, 1875)

= Glyptotherium =

Glyptotherium Temporal range: Early Pliocene (Zanclean)-Late Pleistocene ~3.9–0.015 Ma

Extinct genus of xenarthran mammals

Glyptotherium (from Ancient Greek for 'grooved or carved beast') is a genus of glyptodont (an extinct group of large, herbivorous armadillos) in the family Chlamyphoridae that lived from the Early Pliocene, about 3.9 million years ago, to the Late Pleistocene, around 15,000 years ago. It was widely distributed, living in the United States, Mexico, Guatemala, Costa Rica, Honduras, El Salvador, Panama, Venezuela, Colombia, and Brazil. Fossils that had been found in the Pliocene Blancan Beds in Llano Estacado, Texas were named Glyptotherium texanum by American paleontologist Henry Fairfield Osborn in 1903. Another species, G. cylindricum, was named in 1912 by fossil hunter Barnum Brown on the basis of a partial skeleton that had been unearthed from the Pleistocene deposits in Jalisco, Mexico. The two species differ in several aspects, including age: G. texanum is from the older Early Pliocene to Early Pleistocene strata, whereas G. cylindricum is exclusive to the Late Pleistocene.

Glyptotherium was a large, four-legged (quadrupedal), herbivorous armadillo with an armored top shell (carapace) that was made of hundreds of interconnected osteoderms (structures in dermis composed of bone). Other pieces of armor covered the tail and cranium roof, while small pebbly pieces of armor were in the skin. Glyptotherium grew up to 2 meters (6.56 feet) in length and 400 kilograms (880 pounds), making it one of the largest glyptodonts known. Glyptotherium is morphologically most similar to Glyptodon: though they differ in several ways. Glyptotherium is smaller on average, with a shorter carapace, a longer tail, and had a different distribution.

Glyptodont diversity diminished into the Pleistocene, though they peaked in size during this period. Glyptotherium is considered an example of American megafauna, most of which are now extinct, and may have been wiped out by changing climate or human hunting. Glyptotherium was primarily a grazer that lived on open grasslands, though it also consumed fruits and other plants. The armor could protect the animal from predators, including the "saber-tooth cat" Smilodon, the "bone-crushing dog" Borophagus, and the "short-faced bears" (Tremarctinae).

== History and phylogeny ==
In the 1870s, fossils attributable to Glyptotherium were found by civil engineers Juan N. Cuatáparo and Santiago Ramírez collected a glyptodont specimen from a drainage canal near Tequixquiac, Mexico. The fossils came from the Rancholabrean age, which corresponds to the Pleistocene epoch of the Quaternary Period. This specimen, a skull, nearly complete carapace (top shell), and associated postcranial skeleton, was the first discovery of a glyptodont in North America. Cuatáparo and Ramírez named the fossils Glyptodon mexicanum in 1875, but the fossils have been lost. Another species of Glyptodon from Mexico was described in 1889, G. nathoristi, by German paleontologists based on carapace remains from Pleistocene localities in Ejutla, Oaxaca.

In 1888, paleontologist Edward Drinker Cope described a single carapace osteoderm that had been collected from the Lower Pleistocene "Equus Beds" of Nueces County, Texas. Cope named this osteoderm Glyptodon peltaliferus, but he did not give the species a proper description that followed ICZN rules, making it a nomen nudum and a synonym of G. cylindricum. The next year, Joseph Leidy named Glyptodon floridanus based on isolated carapace osteoderms and pieces of caudal armor, which he initially referred to G. peltaliferus, that were collected from Pleistocene deposits in DeSoto County, Florida. This species is a nomen vanum (invalid name) and considered a synonym of Glyptotherium cylindricum according to a review of the genus by American paleontologists David Gillette and Clayton Ray (1981).

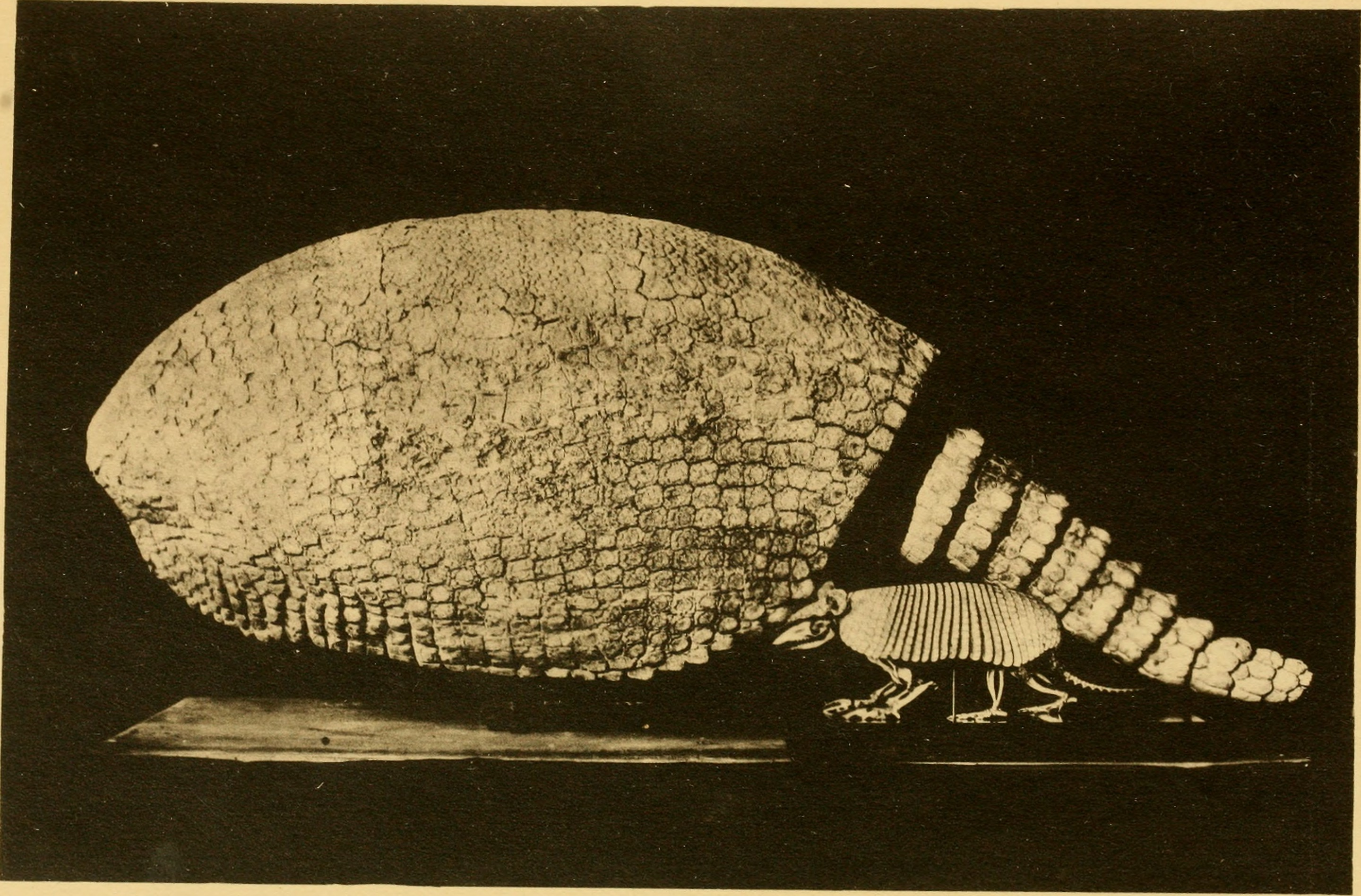
The holotype of G. texanum next to a skeleton of the Southern naked-tailed armadillo

Glyptotherium was named in 1903 based on fossils collected by an American Museum of Natural History (AMNH) expedition led by James W. Gidley to the Early Pliocene strata from the Blanco Formation of Llano Estacado, Texas. They were described by Henry Fairfield Osborn as a new genus and species of glyptodont, Glyptotherium texanum. The fossils, which were deposited at the AMNH, consist of a carapace and associated postcranial elements. This is one of the few G. texanum skeletons known. The generic name Glyptotherium comes from the Greek roots glyph, meaning "carved" or "grooved", and therion, meaning "beast", a commonly used suffix for prehistoric mammals. The species is named after the holotype (name-bearing specimen) specimen's discovery in Texas.

Another find came in 1910 when, while traveling in Jalisco, Mexico, fossil hunter Barnum Brown collected a complete dorsal carapace and several additional fossils, including teeth, of a single individual from the Pleistocene strata of the area. The specimen was sent to the AMNH as well, where it was described by Brown in 1912 as a new genus and species of glyptodont, Brachyostracon cylindricum; the species name comes from the roots cylindricum, meaning "cylindrical", due to the cylindroid anatomy of the premolars in the holotype of G. cylindricum. Brown also recombined Glyptodon mexicanum into Brachyostracon mexicanum, though Brachyostracon is a synonym of Glyptotherium and B. mexcianum is a synonym of G. cylindricum. In 1923, Oliver Perry Hay named a new species of Glyptodon, G. rivipacis, based on the fossils described by Leidy from DeSoto County, Florida. This species is now seen as a nomen nudum and synonymous with Glyptotherium cylindricum. Hay also described well-preserved fossils, including skull elements and teeth, that were collected from Rancholabrean strata in Wolf City and Sinton, Texas and referred to Cope's Glyptodon peltaliferus. These fossils have since been referred to G. cylindricum. In addition to G. peltaliferus, the earlier-named species G. mexicanum and G. nathoristi have been synonymized with G. cylindricum.

A third genus of North American glyptodont, Boreostracon floridanum, was established by George Gaylord Simpson in 1929 based on several isolated specimens unearthed by the AMNH from Rancholabrean-age localities in Florida, the holotype consisting of; the rear portion of a carapace recovered from Seminole Field locality in Pinellas County, Florida. Simpson referred all of the fossils previously described from Florida to B. floridanum and believed that none of the glyptodont fossils unearthed from North America were Glyptodon. Simpson chose not to designate a new genus or species for Glyptodon peltaliferus, but still believed that the fossils were from a separate genus of glyptodont. Boreostracon floridanum has been synonymized with Glyptotherium cylindricum. Inquiry into North American glyptodonts dissipated after the research of Gidley, Hay, Simpson, and others, but some paleontologists still incorrectly referred fossils from the continent to Glyptodon.

In 1927, many Early Pleistocene age fossils were collected by the University of Oklahoma from a locality in Frederick, Oklahoma, including several fragmentary fossils of glyptodonts, equids, gomphotheres, and camelids. The glyptodont fossils were originally referred to Glyptodon in 1928, but were not properly described until 1953. They were described as a new genus and species, Xenoglyptodon fredericensis, in 1953 on the basis of a partial lower jaw and several teeth. The species is now considered a junior synonym of G.texanum. After all of these North American genera were named, analysis of their relationships to one another was not conducted until 1981, when David Gillette and Clayton Ray published a monograph on North American glyptodonts. In their monograph, they recombined all previously named genera and species into Glyptotherium and researched the genus' ecology, anatomy, and distribution. G. arizonae, G. floridanum, and G. mexicanum were kept as valid species alongside G. texanum and G. cylindricum. The synonymy of G. arizonae with G. texanum and G. floridanum and G. mexicanum with G. cylindricum after the discovery of more complete skeletons.

In the 21st century, hundreds of additional fossils have been referred to the genus from Central America and Brazil. These include fossils previously referred to Glyptodon and Hoplophorus, as many fossils were hastily assigned to both by 19th century paleontologists. One of the specimens reassigned to Glyptotherium, an isolated osteoderm, was collected from Pleistocene age carbonate caves in Lagoa Santa in the state of Minas Gerais, Brazil, by Friedrich von Sellow during the early 1800s. In 1845, Danish paleontologist Peter Wilhelm Lund described it as a new species of Hoplophorus, H. meyeri. Lund incorrectly named the taxon, making it a nomen nudum. The osteoderm was referred to Glyptotherium in 2010, making it the first known Glyptotherium specimen. In 2022, a host of fossils of G. cylindricum, including skulls (some preserving pathologies caused by humans) were described that had been collected from several sites in Falcón, northern Venezuela that dated to the Late Pleistocene. A 2026 paper by Brazilian paleontologists Édison Vicente Oliveira and colleagues determined that NHMD 2045557, a skull that was discovered in a Late Pleistocene deposit in Lagoa Santa. This skull was originally described by Danish paleontologist J. Reinhardt as belonging to a distinct species, "Schistopleurum euphractum", that was meant to replace the name Hoplophorus euphractus. This was based on the assumption that Hoplophorus was invalid, which was countered by later authors.

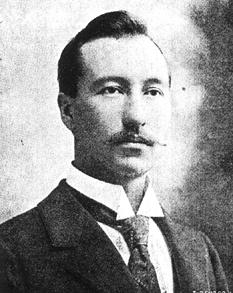
A portrait of Barnum Brown, discoverer of G. cylindricum

=== Phylogeny ===
Glyptotherium is a genus in the subfamily Glyptodontinae, an extinct clade of large, thoroughly armored armadillos that first evolved in the Late Eocene (ca. 33.5 mya) and went extinct in the Late Pleistocene extinctions. Glyptodontinae was classified in its own family or even superfamily until in 2016, when ancient DNA was extracted from the carapace of a 12,000 year old glyptodont called Doedicurus, and a nearly complete mitochondrial genome was reconstructed (76x coverage). Comparisons with the DNA of modern armadillos revealed that glyptodonts diverged from tolypeutine and chlamyphorine armadillos approximately 33.5 million years ago in the late Eocene. This prompted moving them from their own family, Glyptodontidae, within the extant Chlamyphoridae as a subfamily, renamed Glyptodontinae. The following phylogenetic analysis was conducted by Frédéric Delsuc and colleagues in 2016 and represents the phylogeny of Cingulata using ancient DNA from Doedicurus to determine the position of it and other Glyptodonts:

- Cingulata
  - Dasypodidae
  - Chlamyphoridae
    - Euphractinae
      - Euphractus
      - - Zaedyus
        - - Chaetophractus villosus
          - - Chaetophractus nationi
            - C. vellerosus
    - - †Glyptodontinae (Doedicurus)
      - - Chlamyphorinae
          - Chlamyphorus
          - Calyptophractus
        - Tolypeutinae
          - Priodontes
          - - Tolypeutes
            - Cabassous

The internal phylogeny of Glyptodontinae is convoluted and in a flux. Many species and genera have been erected on the basis of fragmentary or undiagnostic material that has not been comprehensively reviewed. It is usually considered its own family, but DNA analyses have reduced it to a subfamily with tribes instead of subfamilies. One tribe, Glyptodontini (typically labeled Glyptodontinae) is a group of younger, larger glyptodonts that evolved in the Middle Miocene (ca. 13 mya) with Boreostemma, but split into two genera: Glyptodon and Glyptotherium. Glyptodontini is often recovered as more basal to most other glyptodonts like Doedicurus, Hoplophorus, and Panochthus. Glyptodontini is distinguishable from other groups for example in that it has large, conical tubercular osteoderms absent or only present on the caudal (tailward) notch on the posterior end of the carapace and different ornamentation of the armor on the carapace than the tail.

When Glyptotherium was first described by Henry Fairfield Osborn in 1903, it was placed at the family level Glyptodontidae and Osborn stated that it was closer in appearance and classification to Panochthus and Neosclerocalyptus (then Sclerocalyptus). Barnum Brown believed that Brachyostracon was in its own family of glyptodonts, but did not coin any new name for this family. Instead, he classified the genus within Sclerocalyptidae along with South American glyptodonts like Panochthus, Neosclerocalyptus, and Plohophorus. George Gaylord Simpson believed Boreostracon was a close relative of Glyptodon. Xenoglyptodon was placed as a glyptodont close to the other North American genera by Grayson Meade in 1953, but he did not state its relation to South American genera. The current consensus is that Glyptotherium belongs to the tribe Glyptodontini and bears two species in its genus. Below is the phylogenetic analysis conducted by Cuadrelli et al. (2020) of Glyptodontinae, with Glyptodontidae as a family instead of a subfamily, that focuses on advanced Glyptodonts:

- Chlamyphoridae
  - Euphractus sexcinctus
  - - Pampatherium
    - Glyptodontinae
      - - Glyptodontini
          - - Boreostemma acostae
            - Boreostemma venezolensis
          - - - Glyptotherium cylindricum
              - Glyptotherium texanum
            - - Glyptodon jatunkhirkhi
              - - Glyptodon reticulatus
                - Glyptodon munizi
        - - - Propalaehoplophorus australis
            - - Eucinepeltus petestatus
              - - Cochlops muricatus
                - - Plohophorus figuratus
                  - Pseudoplohophorus absolutus
                  - - Doedicurini
                      - Eleutherocercus antiquus
                      - Doedicurus clavicaudatus
                    - - Neosclerocalyptini
                        - Neosclerocalyptus ornatus
                        - Neosclerocalyptus paskoensis
                      - Hoplophorini
                        - Hoplophorus euphractus
                        - - Panochthus intermedius
                          - Panochthus tuberculatus

== Description ==
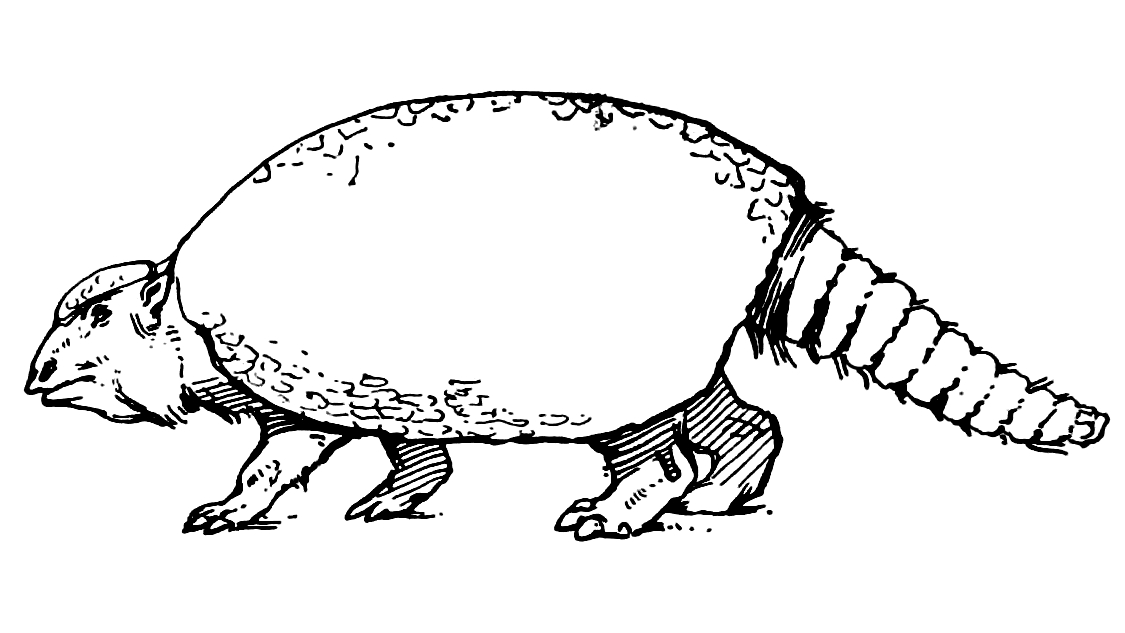
A 1910 life restoration of G. texanum

Like its living relative, the armadillo, Glyptotherium had a shell that covered its entire torso, with smaller armor also covering the skull roof of the head. The carapace (top shell) of Glyptotherium shell was made up of 1,800 or more small, hexagonal osteoderms in each individual. The axial skeleton of glyptodonts show extensive fusion in the vertebral column and the pelvis (hipbone) is fused to the carapace, making the pelvis entirely immobile. Glyptotherium was very graviportal and had short limbs that are very similar to those in other glyptodonts. The large tails of glyptodonts likely served as a counterbalance to the rest of the body. Glyptotherium's caudal armor ended in a blunt tube that was composed of 2-3 fused tubes, in contrast to those of South American mace-tailed glyptodonts. The digits of Glyptotherium are very stout and adapted for weight-bearing, with some preserving large claw sheaths that had an intermediate morphology between claws and hooves.

Glyptotherium weights and sizes vary, but G. texanum was smaller and lighter than the later species, G. cylindricum. One specimen of G. cylindricum was estimated at 350 kilograms (770 lb) to 380 kilograms (840 lb), compared to 457 kilograms (1,008 lb) of its relative Glyptodon reticulatus. The largest estimates of Glyptotherium's mass are based on adult specimens from Brazil and Arizona, with one estimate of a G. cylindricum specimen placing it at 710 kilograms (1,570 lb) and a G. texanum individual at 1,165 kilograms (2,568 lb). One specimen of G. cylindricum, AMNH 15548, preserves a carapace length of 169 centimetres (5.54 ft) compared to just 140 centimetres (4.6 ft) for MSM P4464, a G. texanum specimen.

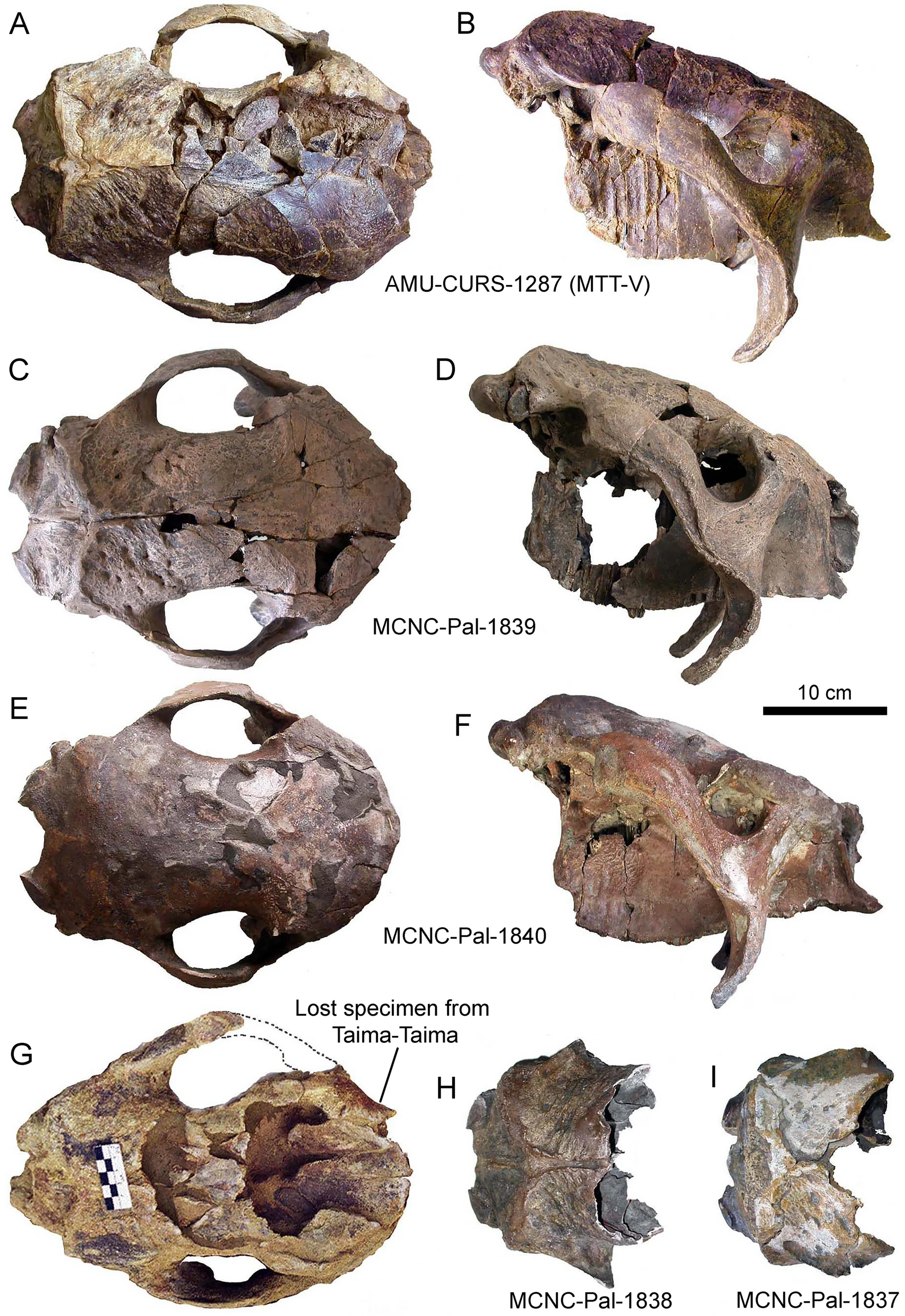
Skulls of G. cylindricum from Venezuela

G. texanum is distinct from G. cylindricum in the configuration of the osteoderms in the dorsal carapace in that the central figures of G. texanum's are flat or weakly convex and very large, while those of G. cylindricum are flat or concave and much smaller. In both species, the central figures of the osteoderms get larger towards the margins of the carapace.

=== Skull and mandible ===
Glyptodont dentition has all hypsodont (high crowned teeth adapted for grazing) molariforms, cheek teeth, which are some of the highest crowned proportionally known from terrestrial mammals. Glyptodont skulls have several unique features; the maxilla and palatine are enlarged vertically to make space for the molariforms, while the braincase is brachycephalic, short and flat. Dermal armor was not restricted to the carapace and tail, as the skull roof was protected by a "cephalic shield" made of osteoderms. Only one complete skull is known from G. texanum, giving a limited perspective on its anatomy.

Glyptotherium's zygoma are narrow, slender, almost parallel, and close to the sagittal plane in anterior view. In Glyptodon, the zygoma are broader, more robust, and are more divergent rather than parallel. Glyptotherium and other glyptodonts preserve large nasal passages and sinuses that may have had nostrils adapted to breathe in the cold arid climates of the Americas during the Pleistocene. Some paleontologists have proposed that Glyptotherium and some glyptodonts also had a proboscis or large snout similar to those in elephants and tapirs, but few have accepted this hypothesis. The infraorbital foramina (openings in the maxilla) are narrow and not visible in anterior view in Glyptotherium but are broad and clearly visible in Glyptodon.

In lateral view, the dorso-ventral height between the skull roof and the palatal plane in Glyptodon decreases anteriorly, contrary to Glyptotherium; the nasal tip is in a lower plane with respect to the zygomatic arch in Glyptodon, but in Glyptotherium is higher than the zygomatic arch plane. In Glyptotherium, the occlusal lateral profile is slightly curved, whereas it is strongly curved in Glyptodon. In Glyptodon, the 1st molariform (abbreviated as mf1) is distinctly trilobate (three-lobed) both lingually and labially, nearly as trilobate as the mf2; on the contrary, Glyptotherium shows a very low trilobation of mf1, which is elliptical in cross section, the mf2 is weakly trilobate, and the mf3 is trilobate. In both genera, the mf4 to mf8 are fully trilobate and serially identical.

The mandibles of Glyptotherium and Glyptodon are very similar, but Glyptotherium's mandible is smaller by about 10%. The angle between the occlusal plane and the anterior margin of the ascending ramus is approximately 60° in Glyptotherium, while it is 65° in Glyptodon. The ventral margin of the horizontal ramus is more concave in Glyptodon than in Glyptotherium. The symphysis area is extended greatly in Glyptotherium antero-posteriorily compared to Glyptodon. The mf1 is ellipsoidal in Glyptotherium and the mf2 is submolariform, while in Glyptodon both teeth are trilobate.

=== Carapace and osteoderms ===
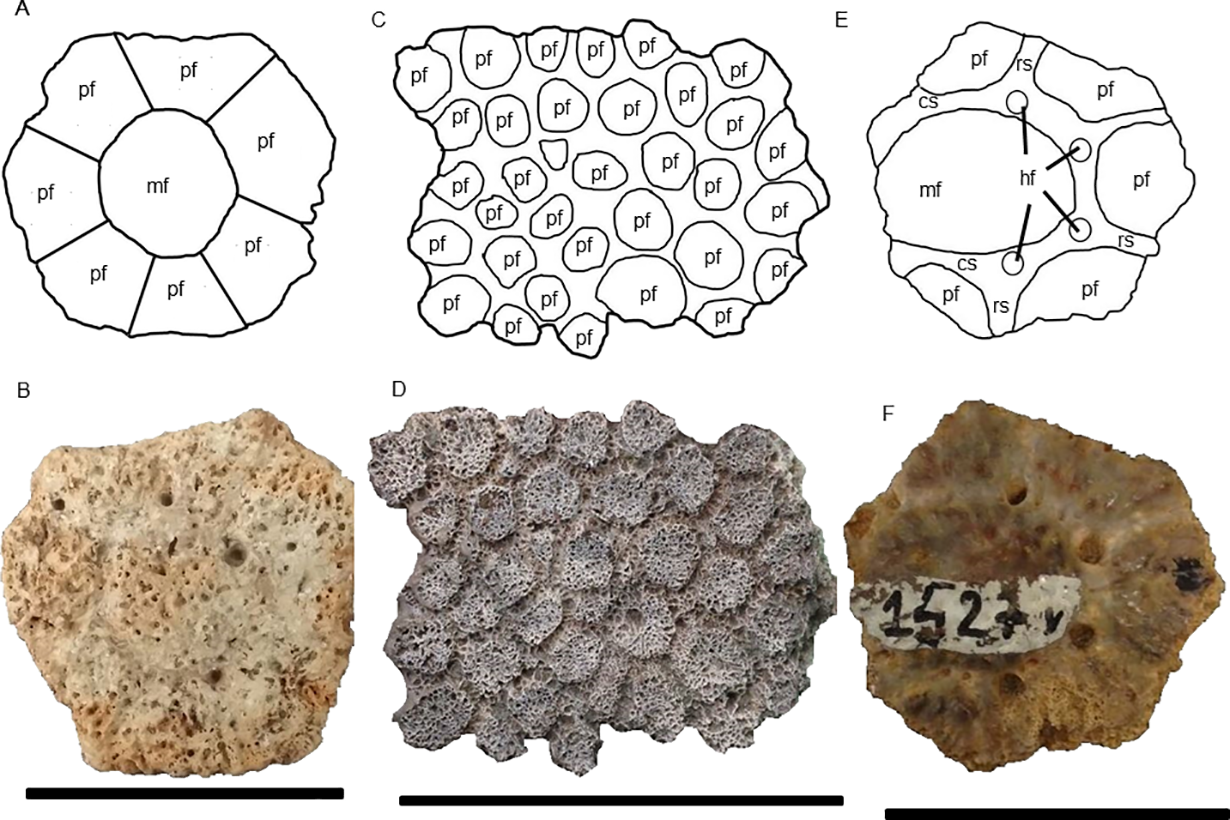
Osteoderm of Glyptotherium (A) and (B), displaying the "rossette" pattern

The carapace of Glyptotherium was shorter than that of its relative Glyptodon, but much more elongated than that of Boreostemma. The high point of the carapace was at the center of the midline, while Glyptodon's was slightly displaced. Glyptotherium's carapace was strongly arched, with a convex pre-iliac (hip) and concave post-iliac, giving it a saddle-like overhang over the tail. In Glyptodon the top-bottom height of the carapace represents 60% of its total length, whereas in Glyptotherium it is taller at ca. 70%. The ventral margin of the carapace in Glyptotherium is more rectangular and less convex than in Glyptodon. In Glyptotherium, the osteoderms in the antero-lateral areas of the carapace are less ankylosed than in Glyptodon, suggesting that the antero-lateral carapace regions of the former were more flexible. The osteoderms of the caudal aperture are more conical in Glyptodon and more rounded in Glyptotherium, though in the latter the anatomy of the caudal aperture osteoderms varies by sex while in Glyptodon it varies by age. An examination of Glyptotherium specimens from Blancan Arizona suggests that over time the carapace of Glyptotherium became more robust and with a thicker shell, matching a larger overall build.

Although frequently used to differentiate the two taxa, Glyptotherium and Glyptodon have very similar osteoderm morphologies that hardly differ. Both genera have thick osteoderms compared to those of many South American glyptodonts like Hoplophorus and Neosclerocalyptus, but Glyptotherium always preserve a "rossette" pattern, where the osteoderm's central figure is surrounded by a row of peripheral figures. Some Glyptodon specimens preserve these "rossettes", but others lack them. The central and radial sulci are deeper and broader in Glyptodon (ca. 4–6 millimetres (0.16–0.24 in)) than in Glyptotherium (ca. 1–2.4 millimetres (0.039–0.094 in)). Notably, Glyptotherium osteoderms preserve small gaps for hair follicles in the sulci that indicate that Glyptotherium had a "fuzzy" carapace with fur coming out. The number of follicles varies between ages and the area of the carapace, with juveniles having more follicles than adults, and fewer follicles are known from the lateral, caudal, and rear portions of the carapace.

=== Caudal rings ===
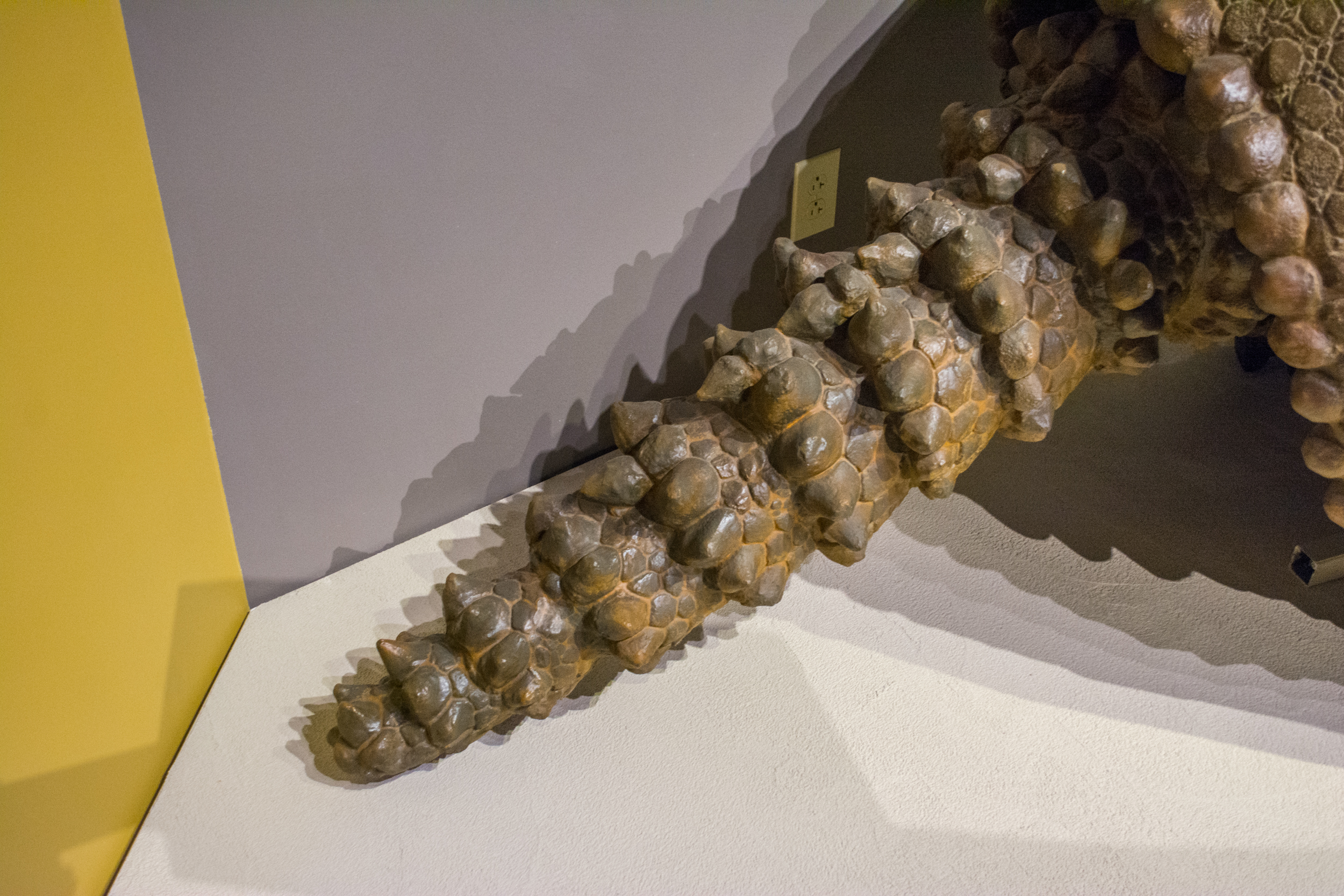
Caudal rings of a glyptodont

Glyptotherium is a glyptodont, meaning its caudal armor is made up of a series of caudal rings ending in a short caudal tube, but the morphology differs between Glyptotherium, Glyptodon, and Boreostemma. Overall, Boreostemma preserves a more similar caudal armor to Glyptotherium than to Glyptodon. The caudal armor is longer in Glyptotherium than in Glyptodon, with one specimen of G. texanum (UMMP 34 826) preserving a 1 metre (3.3 ft) long set of caudal armor. In Glyptotherium, the caudal armor length represents circa 50% of the dorsal carapace's total length, whereas in Glyptodon, this value is lower at around 30-40%. Glyptodon has eight to nine complete caudal rings plus one caudal tube, but Glyptotherium preserves one incomplete caudal ring in addition to the eight to nine complete caudal rings and caudal tube. In both genera, each caudal ring is composed of two or three transverse rows of ankylosed osteoderms, where the distalmost row of osteoderms shows a more or less developed conical morphology. In Glyptotherium, in some specimens (e.g., AMNH 95,737) a low number of conical osteoderms (generally two). This is different from Glyptodon, in which most osteoderms of the distal row (up to 12) present a clear conical morphology. The terminal caudal tube is shorter in Glyptodon. In Glyptotherium, the terminal tube is composed of two to three ankylosed rings, whereas, in Glyptodon, it has only two ankylosed rings. In Glyptotherium, this caudal tube represents ca. 20% of the total length of the caudal armor, whereas in Glyptodon, this structure represents 13% of the total length.

== Paleobiology ==
=== Posture ===
Several interpretations of glyptodont posture have been made, initially by British paleontologist Richard Owen in 1841 using comparative anatomy. Owen theorized that the phalanges were weight-bearing due to their short and broad physiology, in addition to the evidence provided in the postcranial skeleton. It was also proposed that an upright posture was possible for glyptodonts, first by Sénéchal (1865) who stated that the tail could be an equilibrium for the front half of the body as well as a method of supporting the legs. Linear measurements were later taken which provided insight into this hypothesis, finding that bipedalism would be possible. The patellar articulation with the femur suggests rotation of the crus during knee extension and potentially even knee-locking were feasible.

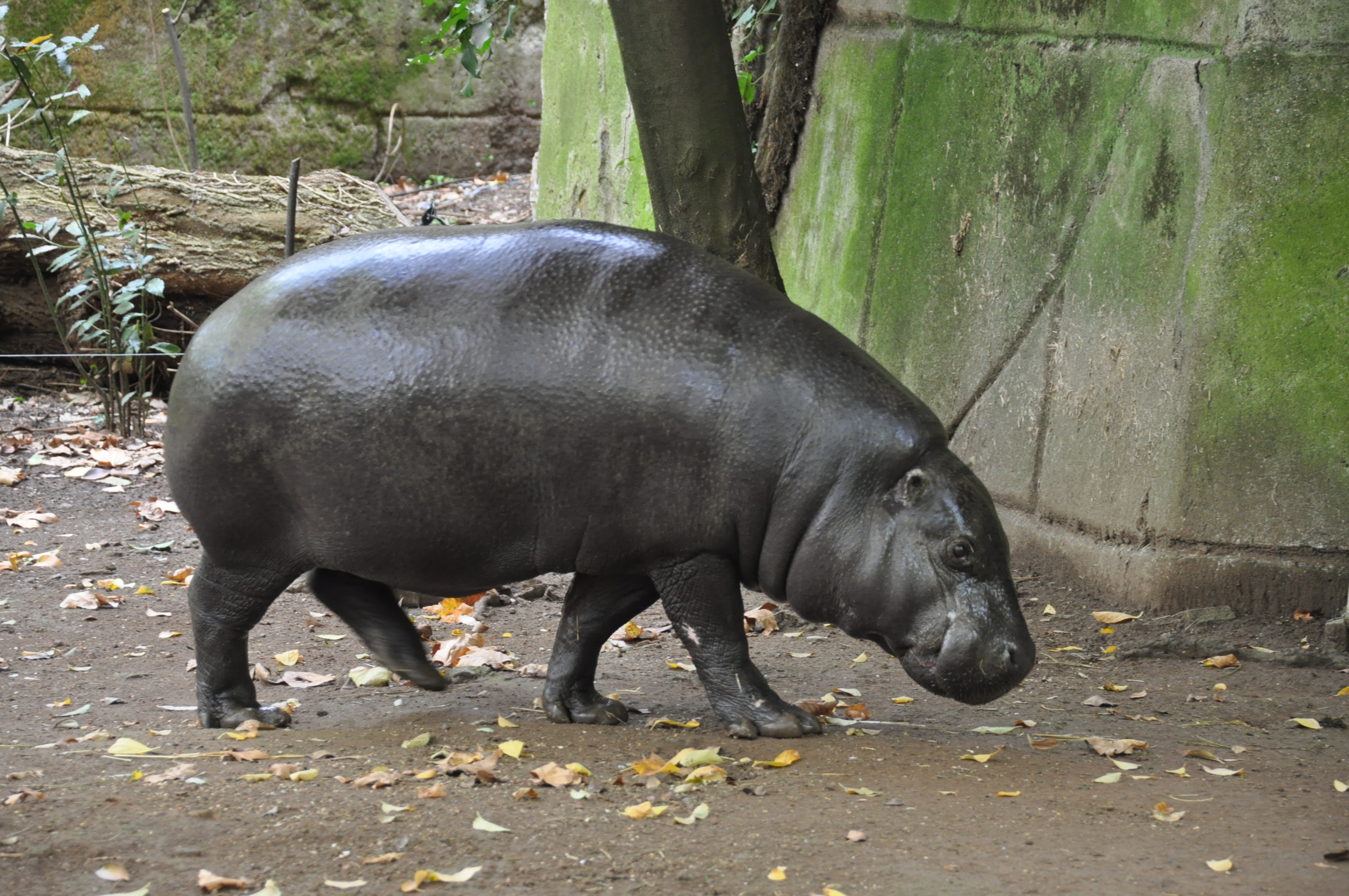
A Pygmy hippopotamus, which has been suggested to have had a similar ecology to Glyptotherium

=== Feeding and diet ===
Glyptotherium is traditionally thought to consume wet, riparian herbs. The genus was mainly a grazer but also had a mixed diet of C3 and C4 plants based on isotope analyses of dental specimens recovered from the Late Pleistocene Cedral locality in San Luis Potosí, México. The locality preserves C4 plants from the families Poacea, Amaranthacea and Quenopodiacea, meaning that they were possible food sources for Glyptotherium. Cedral specifically was an area with hot springs and open grasslands next to them, suggesting that Glyptotherium fed in grasslands near water sources, like the feeding habits of modern capybaras. Additional isotopic analysis of Glyptotherium and the giant ground sloth Eremotherium found the two to have similar isotopic levels to the extant amphibious Hippopotamus, indicating that they were semi-aquatic herbivores that fed on aquatic plants. Additional studies of dental specimens from eastern Brazil suggest that the Glyptotherium were grazers in moist, lowland tropical to subtropical habitats along rivers or water sources, supporting the semi-aquatic Glyptotherium hypothesis. Additional isotopic evidence from Brazil suggests that fruits were also part of Glyptotherium diets, though only around 20% total. Glyptotherium and all other glyptodonts had hypsodont teeth, high-crowned teeth with rough, flat surfaces adapted for grinding and crushing, that were adapted to break down gritty, fibrous material like grasses. This diet for Glyptotherium contrasts with those surmised for their relatives Pampatheres, which have been considered insectivores or grazers. Like most other xenarthrans, glyptodonts had lower energy requirements than most other mammals. They could survive with lower intake rates than other herbivores with similar mass.

=== Digging abilities ===
Many extant species of armadillo have digging capabilities, with large claws adapted for scraping dirt to make burrows or forage for food underground. Much of their diet consists of insects and other invertebrates that live underground, in contrast to the herbivorous diets of Glyptotherium. Being from the armadillo family, glyptodont fossorial capabilities have been researched on several occasions. Owen (1841) opposed this idea, though pushback came from Nodot (1856) and Sénéchal (1865) who believed digging was possible for the genus. However, the evolution of a rigid carapace as opposed to a flexible one in extant armadillos as well as a weakly developed deltoid crest on the humerus (upper arm bone) provided evidence against fossorial hypotheses. The elbow had a great range of movement, as with digging cingulates, but this is more likely to be due to size adaptations.

=== Ontogeny ===
Juvenile and adult specimens of G. texanum found in Blancan localities in Arizona preserve a nearly complete growth series, one of the few known in glyptodonts. The teeth of Glyptotherium preserve hypsodonty, where the teeth do not stop growing. In the juveniles, fully articulated osteoderm-to-osteoderm contact is already known, even at their age. Growth of the osteoderms continued from juveniles to sub-adults and ceased when osteoderms became ankylosed (fused). The lateral profile of juvenile carapaces are gently convex into the high-arched carapaces of adults. Another ontogenetic change is in the sulci and peripheral figures of the osteoderms; the central figures are the largest relative to the sulci in newborns and juveniles, but this ratio becomes lower in adults. In G. cylindricum, however, the osteoderms grow much faster and the sulci are much smaller. The osteoderms are also relatively thicker in juvenile Glyptotherium individuals compared to adults.

=== Sexual dimorphism ===
Individuals of G. texanum found in Blancan localities in Arizona preserve sexual dimorphism between male and female individuals. The caudal aperture, large conical osteoderms that protect the base of the tail, of males and females differ in that the marginal osteoderms of males are much more conical and convex than those of females. Even in the carapaces of newborn Glyptotherium, the marginal osteoderms are either conical or flat, which enables their sex to be determined.

=== Osteoderms and protection ===
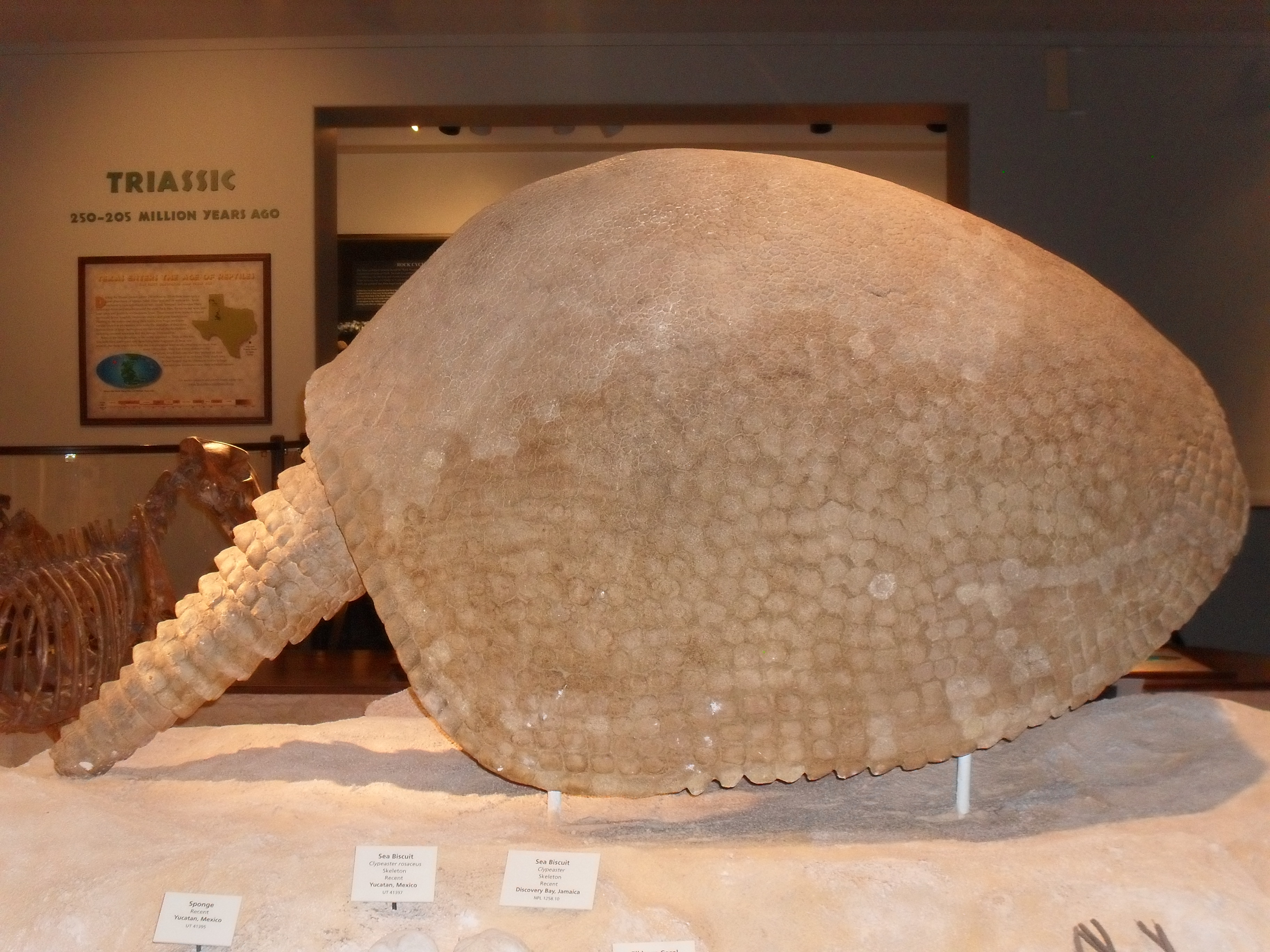
A carapace and caudal armor of G. cylindricum

Osteoderms of Glyptotherium are made of a cancellous trabecular core in between two compact layers. Each hexagonal osteoderm is joined to the adjacent osteoderms with sutures, creating a large, robust carapace similar to those in modern animals. However, the carapaces of glyptodonts like Glyptotherium were far less flexible than those of modern armadillos. The trabecular core was made up of struts used for support with an average thickness of 0.25 mm, these struts making up the central support of the osteoderm. Mechanical analyses revealed that smaller load areas, representing sharper objects, cause higher stresses than those caused by large, blunt objects. This can be understood as the natural structure evolved to withstand blunt impact from large objects such as tail-clubs and not as protection against sharp objects such as teeth. This presents further evidence for the theory that glyptodonts used their carapaces for intraspecific combat using tail clubs as well as defense.

=== Disease and pathologies ===
A partial postcranial skeleton of Glyptotherium cylindricum found in northeastern Brazil that included partial limbs preserved three different types of arthritis: one type of inflammatory arthritis (spondyloarthropathy), one type of crystalline arthritis (calcium pyrophosphate deposition disease) and one proliferative arthritis(osteoarthritis). Spondyloarthropathy was the most prevalent, with bone erosion on the right ulna, right and left radii, a left femur and both right and left tibiae-fibulae and is associated with bone sclerosis on the right ulna and radius. Calcium pyrophosphate deposition disease is present on the articular surface of the left patella and osteoarthritis is represented by osteophytes on some of the left hindlimb. On several osteoderms that were also found in Brazil, ectoparasitism, lesions, and growths were found, some of these infections were likely caused by fleas.

== Paleoecology ==
Glyptotherium was primarily a grazer in forested grasslands and arboreal savannahs, though they may have preferred grasslands near water sources based on fossils localities from Mexico. Due to their wide distribution, Glyptotherium's paleoecology may have varied across regions and its two species.

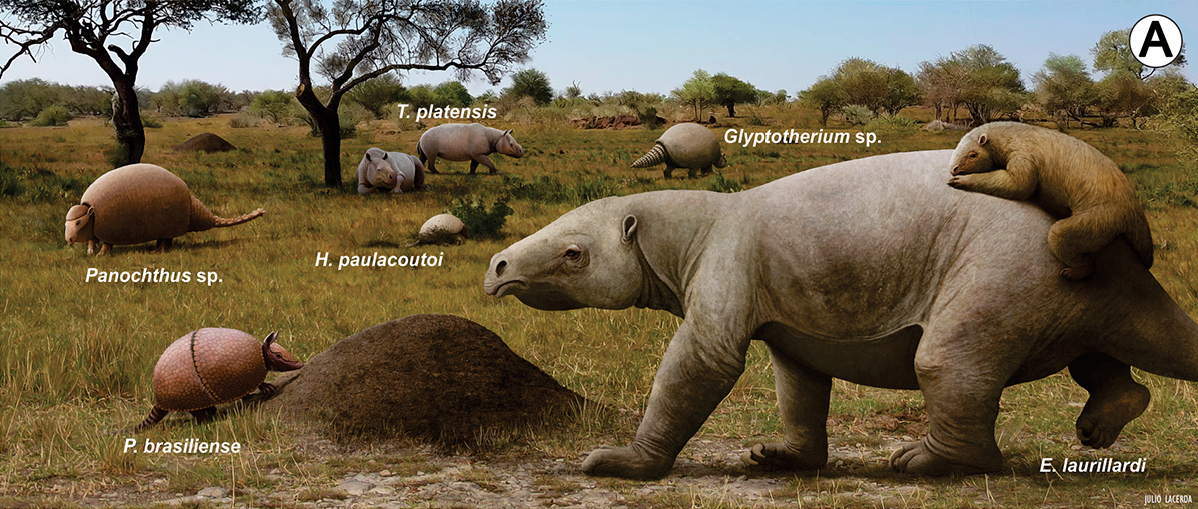
Restoration of the grassland ecosystem present in the Brazilian Intertropical Region

In North America, Glyptotherium is known from two different species that lived in three different intervals, the Blancan, Irvingtonian, and Rancholabrean, across the United States and Mexico. However, Glyptotherium has not been found in Pacific drainages in the United States or west of the Colorado River, being instead present largely in the Atlantic Plain and Interior Plains. During the Blancan, G. texanum coexisted with many endemic genera from North America, as Beringia had not yet formed. Because of this, the fauna of the Blancan starkly contrasted with the fauna of the proceeding Pleistocene. The Blancan age strata of western Texas, New Mexico, and Arizona preserves the gomphothere proboscideans Stegomastodon and Cuvieronius, equids represented by grazers like Nannipus and Equus. Other xenarthrans are also known, like the megalonychid ground sloth Megalonyx and the mylodontid Paramylodon. Fossils of small mammals have also been unearthed, like the insectivores Hesperoscalops and Sorex. A giant fossil ground squirrel, Paenemarmota, is also known from the Blancan. The carnivores include the unusual "bone-crushing" dog relative Borophagus and the "hunting hyena" Chasmaporthetes, in addition to the "saber-toothed" cat Smilodon gracilis. Some isolated bird fossils have also been found consisting of vultures, falcons, and possibly corvids. Fossils from Guatemala were found from high altitudes, showing that Glyptotherium was highly adaptable and could live in a variation of environments. This is supported by the generalist diet of Glyptotherium and fossil's discoveries in tropical, subtropical, forested, and even semi-aquatic environments. In the Mexican state of Yucatán, fossils of Glyptotherium and the ground sloth Paramylodon are known from water-rich areas like riparian forests and swamps as opposed to open grasslands.

In the Brazilian Intertropical Region (BIR) in eastern Brazil, Glyptotherium was a mixed grazer in arboreal savannahs, tropical grasslands, and other grassy areas near water sources. Large, mesoherbivore mammals in the BIR were widespread and diverse, including the rhino-like toxodontids Toxodon platensis and Piauhytherium, the macraucheniid litoptern Xenorhinotherium and equids such as Hippidion principale and Equus neogaeus. Toxodontids were large mixed feeders as well and lived in forested areas, while the equids were nearly entirely grazers. Other xenarthran fossils are present in the area as well from several different families, like the giant megatheriid ground sloth Eremotherium, the scelidotheriids Catonyx and Valgipes, the mylodontids Glossotherium, Ocnotherium, and Mylodonopsis. Smaller ground sloths such as the megalonychids Ahytherium and Australonyx and the nothrotheriid Nothrotherium have also been found in the area. Eremotherium was a generalist, while Nothrotherium was a specialist for trees in low density forests, and Valgipes was an intermediate of the two that lived in arboreal savannahs. Other glyptodonts and cingulates like the grazing glyptodont Panochthus and the omnivorous pampatheres Pampatherium and Holmesina were present in the open grasslands. A proboscidean species has also been found in the BIR, Notiomastodon platensis, was also present and was a mixed grazer on the open grasslands. Carnivores included some of the largest known mammalian carnivores, like the giant felid Smilodon populator and the bear Arctotherium wingei.

Several extant taxa are also known from the BIR, like guanacos, giant anteaters, collared peccaries, and striped hog-nosed skunks. Two crab-eating types of extant mammals are also known from the BIR, the crab-eating raccoon and the crab-eating fox, indicating that crabs were also present in the region. The environment of the BIR is unclear, as there were both several species that were grazers, but the precede of the arboreal fossil monkeys Protopithecus and Caipora in the area causes confusion over the area's paleoenvironment. Most of Brazil was thought to have been covered in open tropical cerrado vegetation during the Late Pleistocene, but if Protopithecus and Caipora were arboreal, their presence suggests that the region may have supported a dense closed forest during the Late Pleistocene. It is possible that the region alternated between dry open savanna and closed wet forest throughout the climate change of the Late Pleistocene.

=== Great American Interchange ===
Examples of fauna that participated in the Great American Interchange

South America, the continent where glyptodonts originated, was isolated after the breakup of the landmass Gondwana at the end of the Mesozoic era. This period of separation from the rest of the Earth's continents led to an age of unique mammalian evolution, with the dominance of groups such as marsupials, xenarthrans, and notoungulates in contrast to the North American mammal fauna. Marsupials likely got to South America prior to its separation from the rest of Gondwana in the Late Cretaceous or Paleogene, although the origins of mammalian orders like Xenarthra and Notoungulata ended up on the continent remains a mystery. There were several movements of outside mammals to South America prior to the formation of the Isthmus of Panama, such as with primates and rodents which may have rafted to the continent from Africa and the movement of bats via flight.

As for the fauna of North America, contemporary groups like canids, felids, ursids, tapirids, antilocaprids, and equids populated the region in addition to extinct families like gomphotheres, amphicyonids, and mammutids. The Great American Interchange did not enter its biggest stage until the Isthmus of Panama formed 2.7 million years ago during the Blancan stage of the Pliocene. This intensified movement of glyptodonts, ground sloths, capybaras, pampatheres, terror birds, and marsupials to North America via the Central America route and a reverse migration of ungulates, proboscideans, felids, canids, and many other megafauna groups to South America. The period following the Isthmus' foundation witnessed the extinction or extirpation of many groups, including the South American terror birds, toxodonts, macraucheniids, pampatheres, ground sloths, and glyptodonts.

Glyptotherium itself was part of this interchange, evolving in the Blancan of the Mexico & the United States after the formation of the Isthmus and its immigration. The geographic isolation of Glyptotherium in combination to adaptations to the different environments of North America led to Glyptotherium breaking off from other glyptodontines. Though G. texanum evolved in North American into G. cylindricum in the Rancholabrean, it emigrated southwards to Central and parts of northern South America circa 20,000-15,000 years Before Present (BP). This is also connected to ecological segregation, with mountain barriers in Colombia possibly separating Glyptodon and Glyptotherium. Subsequently, Glyptodon lived primarily in Andean and coastal sites, with Glyptotherium being known from grassland and lightly forested lowland deposits near aquatic areas, motivating its dispersal to the tropical regions of Venezuela and eastern Brazil.

The re-entrance of a group to South America from North America has also been observed in the related cingulate family Pampatheriidae, possibly aided by wide coastal lowlands uncovered during glacial periods on the Caribbean and Atlantic coasts, allowing migration between Florida, Mexico, Central America, and/or northern South America. A 2025 study analyzing the potential migration patterns of Glyptotherium across the Isthmus of Panama into North America concluded that, based on the niche models developed by the study, Glyptotherium likely took a "high road" into North America. This "high road" was located in northwestern South America through the Andes Mountains and Colombia rather than a lowland Amazonian route. This is consistent with the grazing ecology and climate preferences of Glyptotherium.

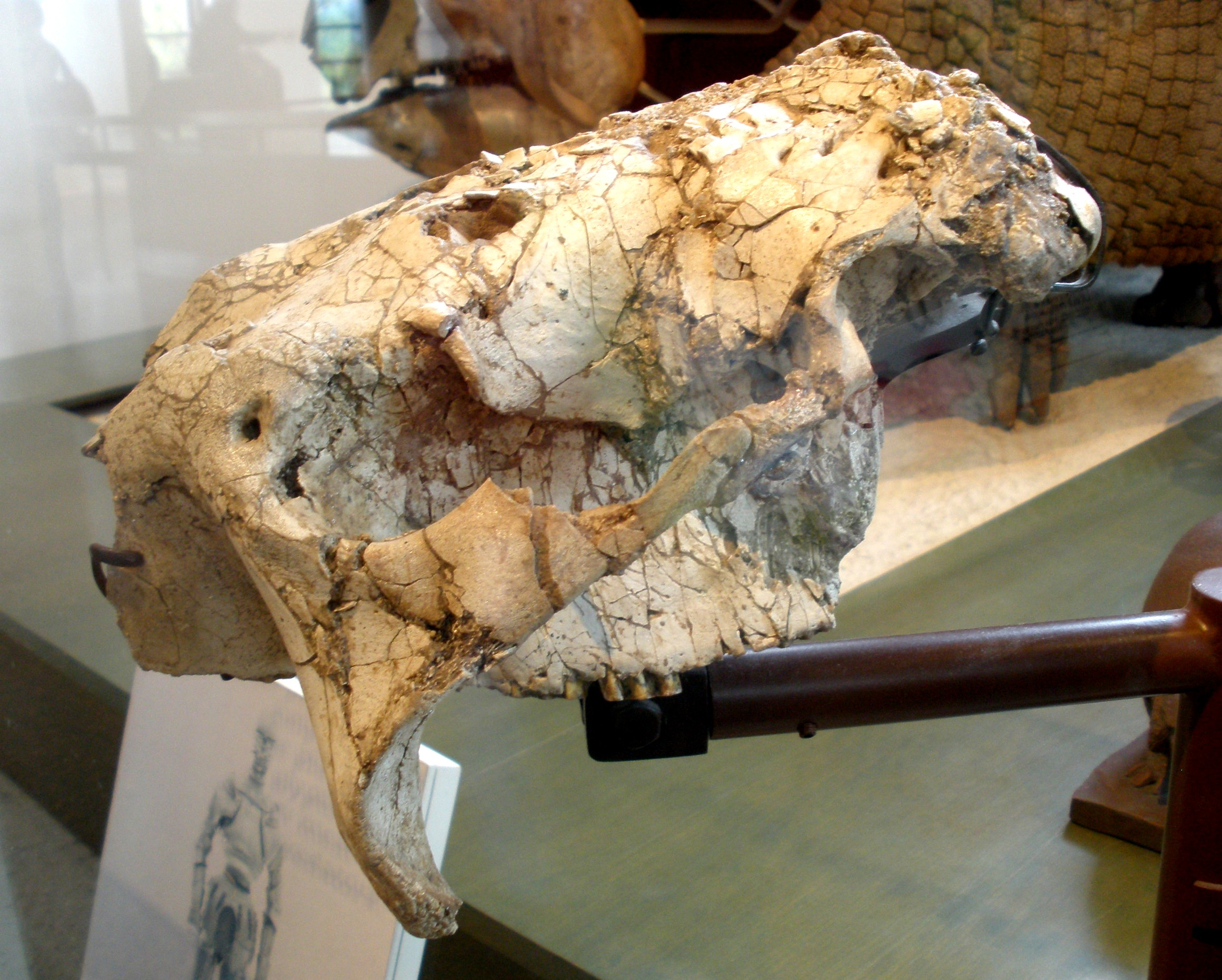
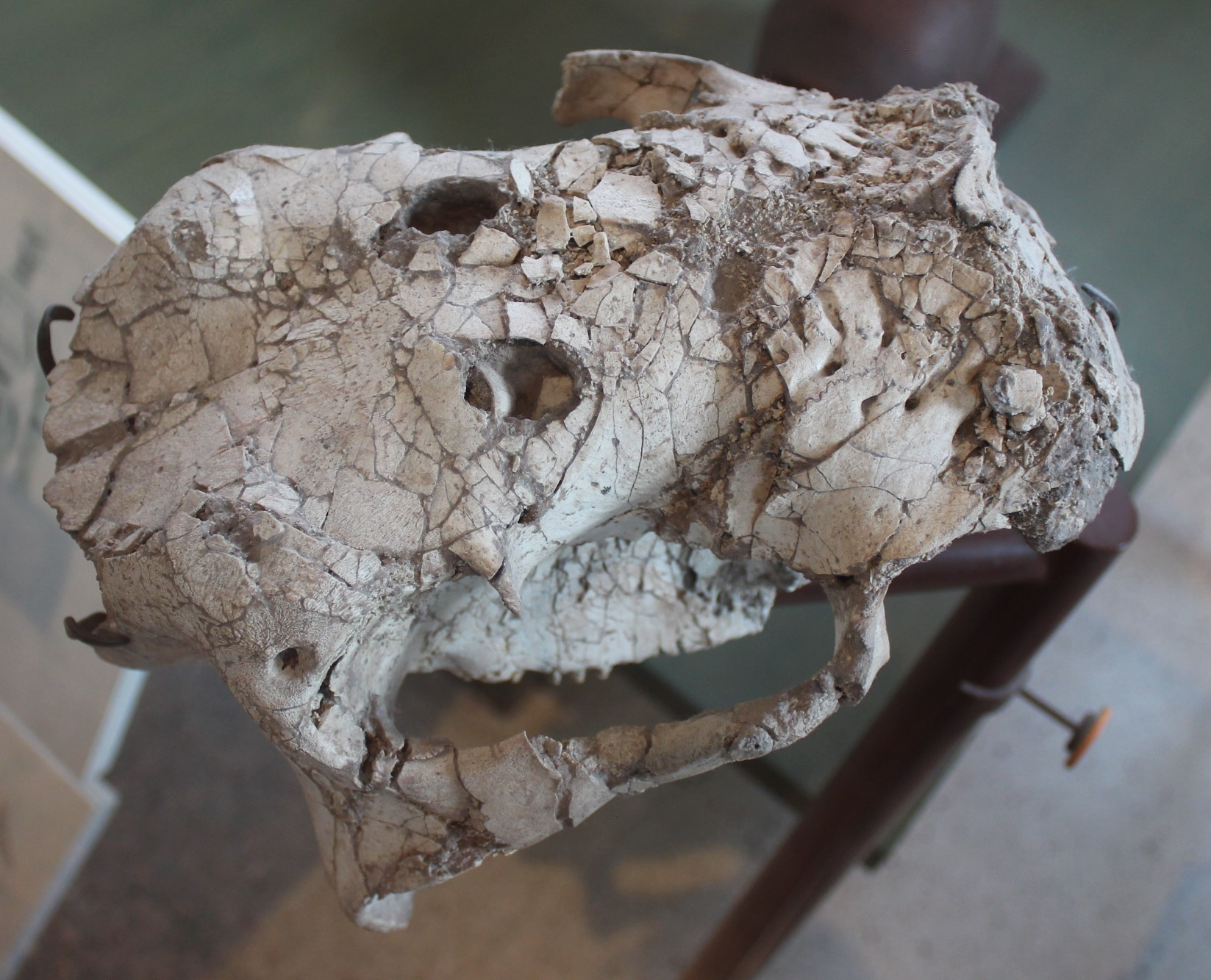
G. texanum skull from Arizona, preserving bite marks from a Smilodon on the skull roof.

=== Predation ===
Smilodon may have occasionally preyed upon Glyptotherium, based on a skull from one G. texanum individual recovered from Pleistocene deposits in Arizona bearing the distinctive elliptical puncture marks that best match those of the machairodont cat, indicating that the predator successfully bit into the skull through the armored cephalic shield. The Glyptotherium in question was a juvenile, with a still-developing head shield, making it far more vulnerable to the cat's attack.

Brandes hypothesized that the evolution of thick glyptodont armor and long machairodont canines was an example of coevolution, but Birger Bohlin argued in 1940 that the canines were far too fragile to do damage against glyptodont armor. However, the evolution of accessory protection structures may have been in response to the arrival of Smilodon and Arctotherium in the Ensenadan.

In 2017, a right ulna of an adult Glyptotherium that had been collected from Late Pleistocene strata in Rio Grande do Norte State, Brazil was described that bore several gnawing traces from a new ichnospecies of Machichnus, M. fatimae, that may have been caused by a juvenile of the canid species Protocyon troglodytes or an adult individual of Cerdocyon thous.

== Relationship with humans ==
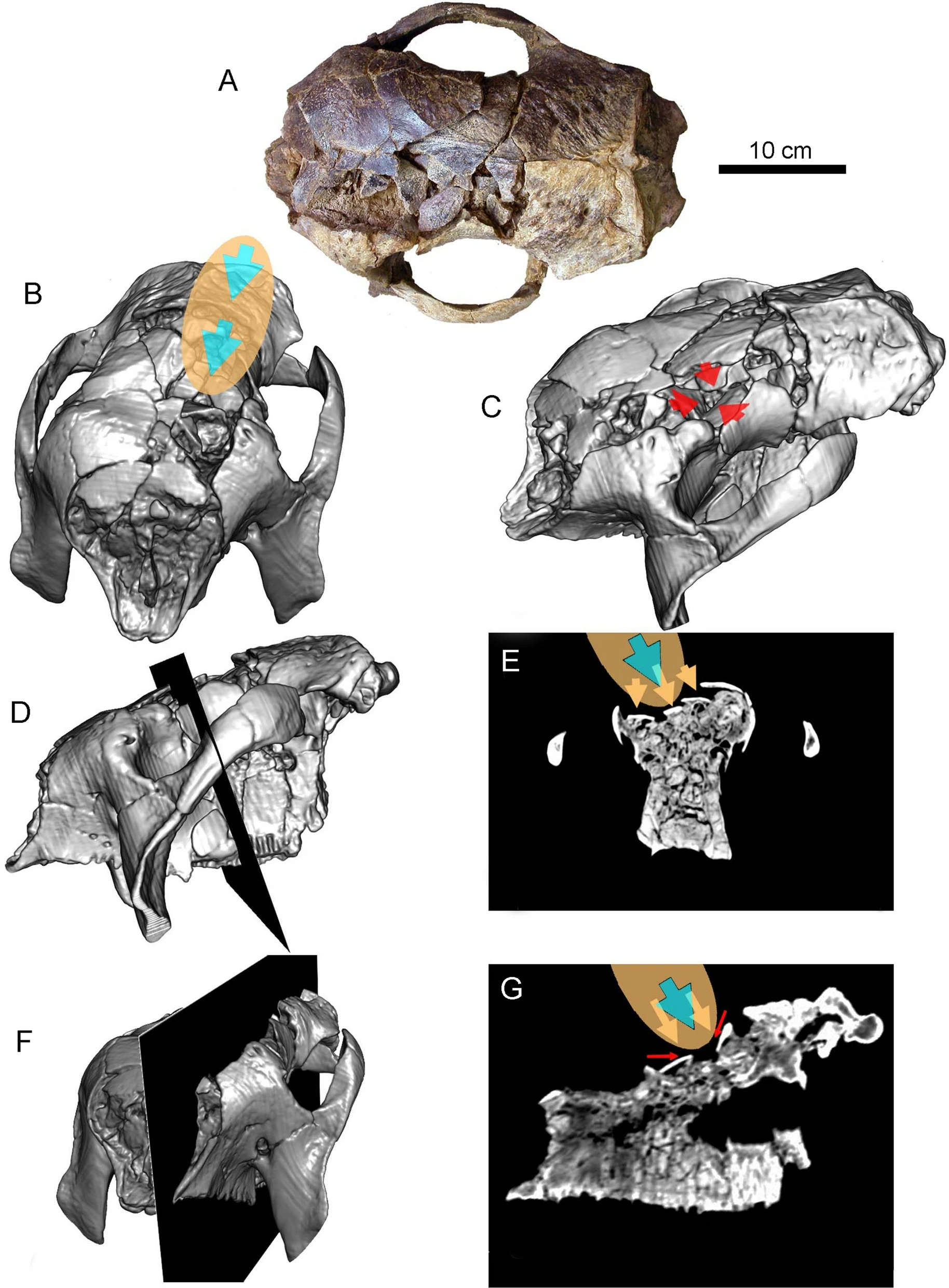
Diagram showing pathologies inflicted on a G. cylindicum skull by humans from Falcón, Venezuela.

The first report of possible human consumption or interaction with Glyptotherium or its fossils came in 1958, where several osteoderms that were possibly consumed by humans were described from the Clovis site in Lewisville, Texas. This idea of human consumption has little evidence to back it, however. In 2022, a host of fossils of G. cylindricum including skulls were described that had been collected from several sites in Falcón, northern Venezuela that dated to the Late Pleistocene. These discoveries were notable not only because they preserved skulls, but four of them exhibited breakages in the fronto-parietal region, a pattern in all of the skulls. Visual and computed tomography (CT) evidence indicates that these were likely caused by a mechanical effect by direct percussion, most likely a blow with a stone chopper or club, which caused the bones in the region to fragment into the soft internal tissues of the skull. Despite the fact that the skulls were complete and showed no signs of taphonomic distortion or transport, they often lacked their jaws. The jaws may have been removed for "hunters" to access and consume masticatory muscles and tongue.

The coexistence of early hunter-gatherer humans and glyptodonts in South America was first hypothesized in 1881 based on fossil discoveries from the Argentine Pampas, and many fossil discoveries from the Late Pleistocene have been unearthed since that exhibit human predation on glyptodonts. During this period, a wide array of xenarthrans inhabited the Pampas were hunted by humans, with evidence demonstrating that the small 300–400 kilograms (660–880 lb) glyptodont Neosclerocalyptus, the armadillo Eutatus, and the gigantic (2,000 kilograms (4,400 lb) glyptodont Doedicurus, the largest glyptodont known, were hunted. The only other record of human predation from outside the Pampas was a partial carapace, found also in Venezuela, that was eviscerated by humans. The discoveries in the localities in Falcón showed the first signs of human hunting on the skulls of glyptodonts, but Glyptotherium also was more defenseless than glyptodonts like Doedicurus.

== Distribution ==
Glyptotherium is the only known North American glyptodont and is known from several regions of the continent from different periods. During the Blancan stage of the Early Pliocene, G. texanum inhabited only central Mexico based on the discovery of a single osteoderm of G. texanum from the early Pliocene strata of Guanajuato, central Mexico, dating to approximately 3.9 million years ago. In the Blancan-Irvingtonian stages of the Early Pleistocene, G. texanum fossils are known from most of Mexico as well as the American states of Arizona, Texas, Oklahoma, Florida, and possibly South Carolina. In the Rancholabrean of the Late Pleistocene, G. cylindricum evolved from G. texanum and its fossils have been unearthed from northern Venezuela, eastern Brazil, Central America, Mexico, and the American states of Texas, Louisiana, Florida, and South Carolina. Footprints have also been recovered from Virginia. Fossils from Glyptotherium from the Early Pliocene have not been found in Central America, but it is likely that G. texanum inhabited the area during the Great American Biotic Interchange. Glyptodont fossils from the middle-late Irvingtonian are not known from the United States, creating a "glyptodont gap" in the United States' fossil record. However, Glyptotherium is recorded during this "pause" in Central America, suggesting a possible retraction of Glyptotherium to southern areas during glacial times.

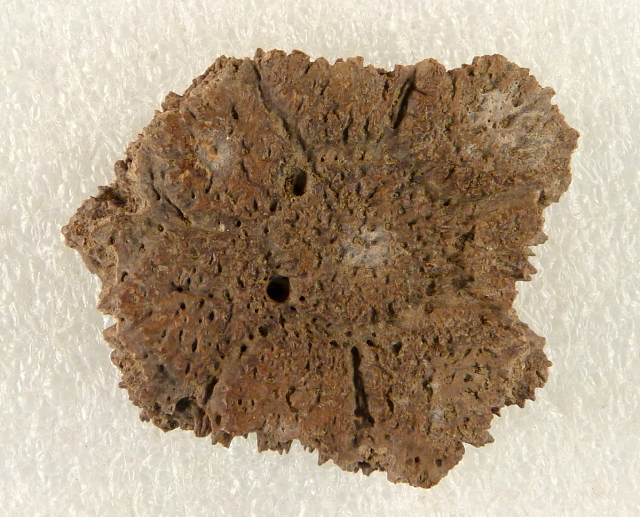
An isolated glyptodont osteoderm from Panama

Glyptotherium fossils have been collected from Central America in Guatemala, Costa Rica, Honduras, El Salvador, and Panama. The fossils from Central America are usually isolated and fragmentary, with the majority being osteoderms or isolated molariforms. In 2023, an associated skeleton of G. cylindricum, including skull and limb elements, from Guatemala was described, the most complete specimen from the region. It is most likely that the first Glyptotherium populations started in Central America during the Great American Biotic Interchange in the Late Pliocene based on their paleobiogeography. Glyptotherium fossils from Central America are sometimes placed as an indeterminate species, but most are placed in G. cylindricum or its synonyms. This referral is also based on the age of the fossils, as the age of G. texanum fossils are measured to range from the Pliocene to early Pleistocene while the age of G. cylindricum fossils are confined to the late Pleistocene. Although commonly regarded as an exclusively North American genus, fossils of Glyptotherium from northern South America in areas like Brazil and Venezuela have been discovered. The fossils from South America are usually only osteoderms or caudal rings and are sometimes indeterminate on a species level, but are most likely from G. cylindricum.

== Extinction ==
The chronology of megafaunal extinctions (such as Glyptotherium) in the Late Pleistocene extinctions has been disputed. In the United States, the last reliable direct radiocarbon date for Glyptotherium is 23,230 ± 490 BP, from Laubach Cave No. 3, Texas. Glyptotherium groups together with Eremotherium, Holmesina, and Paramylodon as having reliable final dates before the end of the Last Glacial Maximum of North America. However, statistical analyses suggest that a later survival until the terminal Pleistocene of the United States is possible, based on sampling biases associated with uncommon fauna, and a lack of reliable dates from the humid Atlantic plain due to poor preservation.

In South America, burnt Glyptotherium remains have been imprecisely dated to between 16,375 ± 400 BP and 14,300 ± 500 radiocarbon BP at Muaco, Venezuela, with similar techniques dating a Glyptotherium specimen from Taima-Taima to 12,580 ± 60 radiocarbon BP, although a minimum date of the entire assemblage (~15,780 cal. BP, 12,980 ± 85 radiocarbon BP) is more recent. As with other extinct Pleistocene megafauna, potential causes of extinction include human hunting, and climate change associated with the Younger Dryas cold interval.

== See also ==
- Neosclerocalyptus
- Pleistocene megafauna
