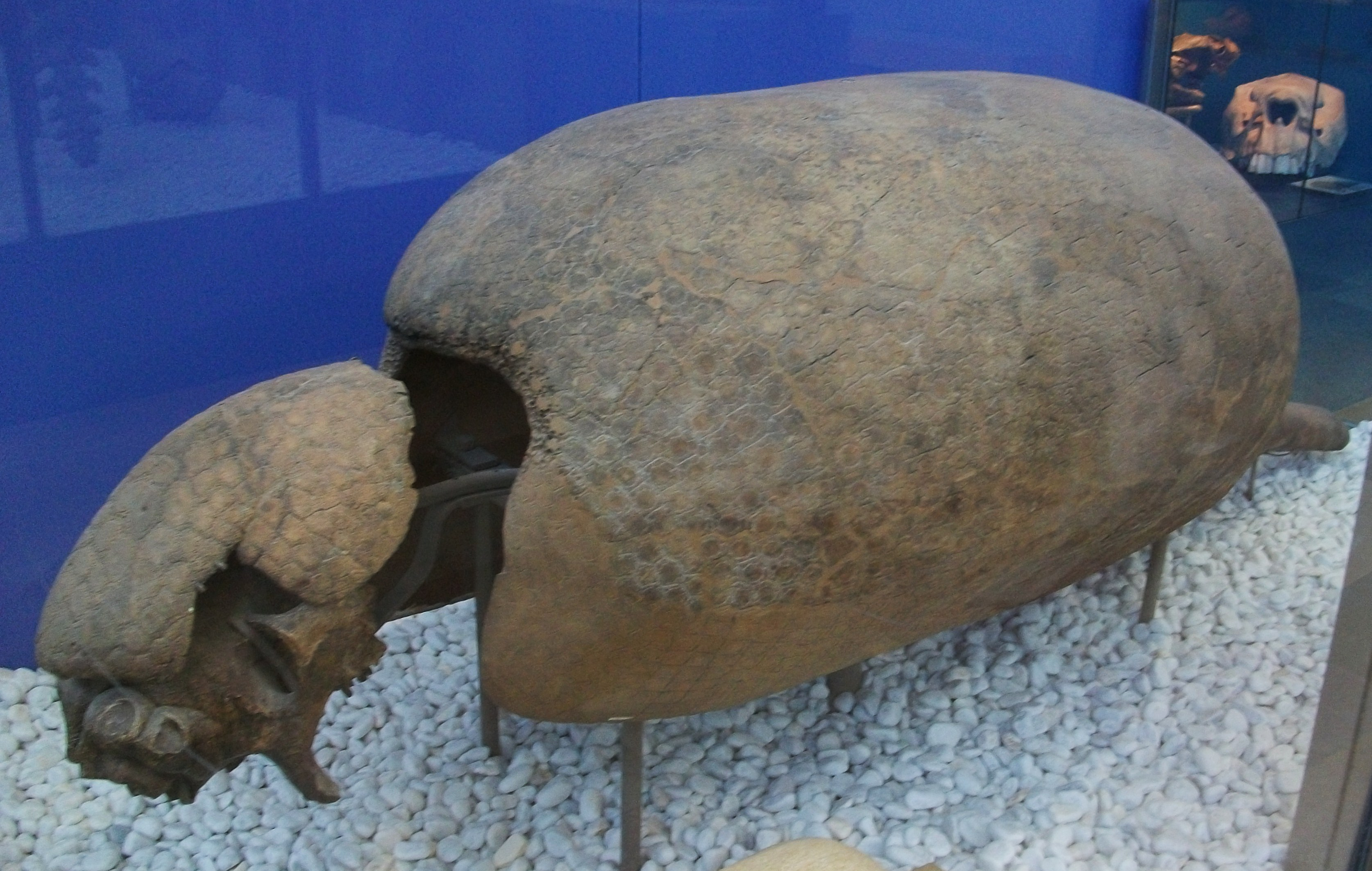
- Fossil in Valencia

Scientific classification
- Kingdom: Animalia
- Phylum: Chordata
- Class: Mammalia
- Order: Cingulata
- Family: Chlamyphoridae
- Subfamily: †Glyptodontinae
- Genus: †Neosclerocalyptus; Couto, 1957

Type species
- †Glyptodon ornatus Owen, 1845

Other Species
- N. castellanosi Zurita et al. 2013; N. gouldi Zurita et al. 2008; N. paskoensis (Zurita 2002); N. pseudornatus (Ameghino, 1889)

Synonyms
- Chacus Zurita 2002; Isolinia Castellanos 1951; Sclerocalyptus Ameghino 1891; Synonyms of N. ornatus: Glyptodon ornatus Owen, 1845; Hoplophorus ornatus (Owen, 1845); Sclerocalyptus ornatus (Owen, 1845); Synonyms of N. paskoensis: Chacus paskoensis Zurita, 2002; Synonyms of N. pseudornatus: Hoplophorus pseudornatus Ameghino, 1889; Lomaphorus pseudornatus (Ameghino, 1889); Sclerocalyptus pseudornatus (Ameghino, 1889)

= Neosclerocalyptus =

Neosclerocalyptus Temporal range: Pliocene-Pleistocene (Uquian-Lujanian) ~3–0.001 Ma

Extinct genus of mammals

Neosclerocalyptus is an extinct genus of glyptodont that lived during the Pliocene, Pleistocene, and Holocene of Southern South America, mostly Argentina. It was small compared to many glyptodonts at only around 2 meters long and either 320 kilograms, or between 383 kg - 598 kg.

== Etymology ==
The genus name Neosclerocalyptus is a modification of the name of its synonym, Sclerocalyptus, and derived from the Greek roots neo- meaning "young" or "new", scleros meaning "hard", and -calyptos meaning "covering", referring to the armored carapace of the animal. The type species, N. ornatus, specific name meaning is "adorned" after the patterns on the holotype osteoderms.

== History and taxonomy ==
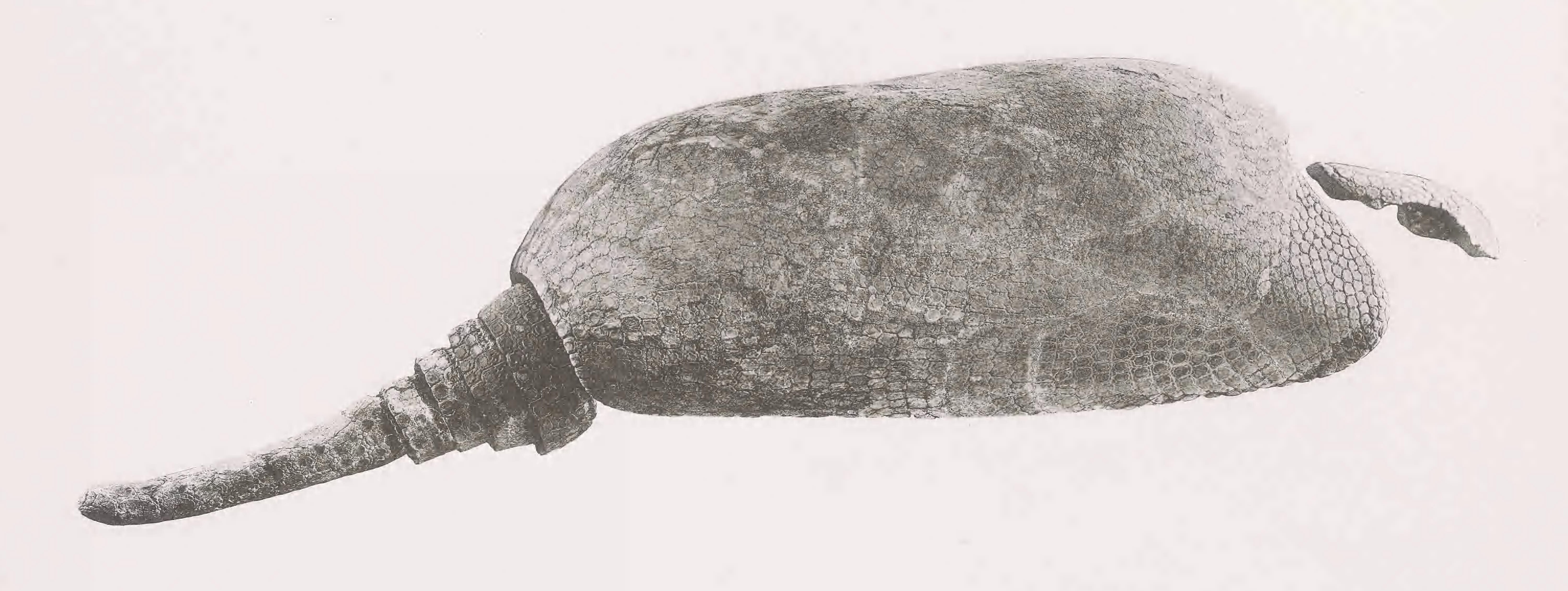
Dermal armor of MLP-16-28, a skeleton of N. ornatus.

Fossils of Neosclerocalyptus were first collected by a "Sir Woodbine Parish, KH" from the Pleistocene strata near the Matanzas River in Buenos Aires Province, Argentina, but where later sent to the Royal College of Surgeons in the UK, where they were later described by paleontologist Sir Richard Owen in 1845 as a species of the earlier named Glyptodon, naming it Glyptodon ornatus. The fossils were fragmentary, consisting only of 4 dorsal carapace osteoderms, but were destroyed during German bombing raids during World War II. The strata where the fossils were collected may be from the Ensenadan of the Pleistocene based on later analysis of the strata around the Matanzas River. Due to the fossils being lost, a neotype was designated by Richard Lydekker in 1887 that consisted of a complete dorsal carapace, caudal rings, and a caudal tube that were also collected from Buenos Aires and deposited in the collections of the Museo Argentino de Ciencias Naturales Bernardino Rivadavia, but it couldn't be found in the museum's collections. Lydekker illustrated a complete skeleton with a complete carapace in 1894 that had been collected from the Ensenadan deposits of the Mar del Plata in Buenos Aires that is extremely similar to that of the neotype and has been used as the "model" specimen of the species since. This is shown by Argentine paleontologist Florentino Ameghino when he stated, "It is a superb sample of a fully grown adult (.) and it should be preferably consulted by paleontologists because it represents approximately the actual shape of the animal".

One of the best known species, N. pseudornatus, was first described by Florentino Ameghino in 1889 based on 13 dorsal carapace osteoderms that were collected from the Pleistocene strata in the "Toscas del Rio de La Plata" in Buenos Aires, though Ameghino named it as a species of the Brazilian glyptodont Hoplophorus. Since its naming, dozens more specimens have been assigned to N. pseudornatus, including skulls. In 1891, Ameghino erected the genus name Sclerocalyptus for the Brazilian glyptodont Hoplophorus euphractus, erroneously believing that the genus name was preoccupied, and placed Glyptodon ornatus and Hoplophorus pseudornatus among other species in the genus. Subsequently it was clear that these two species differ considerably with each other and, due to the rules of zoological nomenclature, the name Sclerocalyptus was considered synonymous with Hoplophorus (described first), and it was necessary to establish a new genus for Sclerocalyptus ornatus: Paula Couto, in 1957, then established the Neosclerocalyptus genus. The taxonomic confusion concerning the names of this species continued throughout the twentieth century and for the first part of the 2000s, but N. ornatus has consistently been seen as valid and the type species. Other species named include N. castellanosi (late Pliocene), N. pseudornatus (lower Pleistocene - Medium), N. gouldi (middle Pleistocene) and N. paskoensis (late Pleistocene-early Holocene). However, many other species that have been named have been synonymous with previously named species or synonymous with other genera, most of them named based on fragmentary fossils.

== Species ==
The following list is after Quiñones et al (2020), Zurita et al (2009), and Zurita (2007). Zurita et al (2009) argued that only 2 species of Neosclerocalyptus are valid (N. ornatus & N. pseudornatus), but subsequent analyses have kept 5 species as valid.

Type:

- N. (Glyptodon) ornatus (Owen, 1845; type species); Holotype (RCS 3606) was destroyed, but contained 4 dorsal carapace osteoderms.

Other valid species:

- N. castellanosi Zurita et al., 2013; Holotype (MPH 0114) is a skull and dorsal carapace fragment.
- N. gouldi Zurita et al., 2008; Holotype (MCA 2010) is a skull, cephalic shield, right humerus, and fragmentary dorsal carapace.
- N. (Chacus) paskoensis (Zurita, 2002); Holotype (Ctes-PZ 5879) is a partial skull, dorsal carapace, and associated skeleton.
- N. (Hoplophorus) pseudornatus (Ameghino, 1889); Holotype (MACN 1233) is a fragment of the dorsal caparace including 13 osteoderms.

Genus synonyms:

- Lomaphorus chapalmalensis Ameghino, 1908; Holotype is dubious, with similarities to Neosclerocalyptus and Eosclerocalyptus.
- Hoplophorus clarazianus Ameghino, 1889; Holotype is several osteoderms and a skull, all fossils have been lost and the species is dubious, though the skull has been referred to Neosclerocalyptus.
- Hoplophorus compressus Ameghino, 1882; Holotype osteoderms' supposed diagnostic traits are the same as those in Neosclerocalyptus species, making it a nomen dubium.
- Hoplophorus cordubensis Ameghino, 1888; Dubious and possibly synonymous with Neosclerocalyptus or Isolina.
- Glyptodon elevatus Nodot, 1857; Holotype osteoderms' supposed diagnostic traits are the same as those in juveniles of Neosclerocalyptus species, making it a nomen dubium.
- Hoplophorus evidens Ameghino, 1889; Holotype is dubious but referred material represents a large, unique form of Neosclerocalyptus.
- Hoplophorus heusseri Ameghino, 1889; Dubious at the species level.
- Hoplophorus paranensis Ameghino, 1883; Synonymous with Neosclerocalyptus, but dubious at the species level.

Dubious:

- N. (Hoplophorus) bergi (Ameghino, 1889); Holotype is dubious and similar to that of Hoplophorus and Panochthus.
- N. (Sclerocalyptus) matthewi (Castellanos, 1925); Holotype is dubious and is identical to that of "Hoplophorus cordubensis".
- N. (Hoplophorus) migoyanus (Ameghino, 1889); Dubious at family level.
- N. (Hoplophorus) perfectus (Gervais & Ameghino, 1880); Holotype is dubious and more similar to that of Hoplophorus and Panochthus.
- N. (Hoplophorus) scrobiculatus (Ameghino, 1889); Holotype may be a chimera and has been declared a species inquirenda.

== Description ==
Like all glyptodonts, this genus also possessed an armored carapace with osteoderms melted with each other, rigid, which covered a large part of the body and head. Neosclerocalyptus was a medium-sized glyptodont, and rarely exceeded 2 meters in length, with N. pseudornatus as the smallest species. One of the largest specimens, CCA-16A, that has been referred to an unnamed species of Neosclerocalyptus was estimated to weigh 471 kilograms (or 1038 lbs), making it the largest definitively known species of Neosclerocalyptus. It was characterized by an elongated and low carapace with two lateral "wings" projected forward in the area of the cervical append.

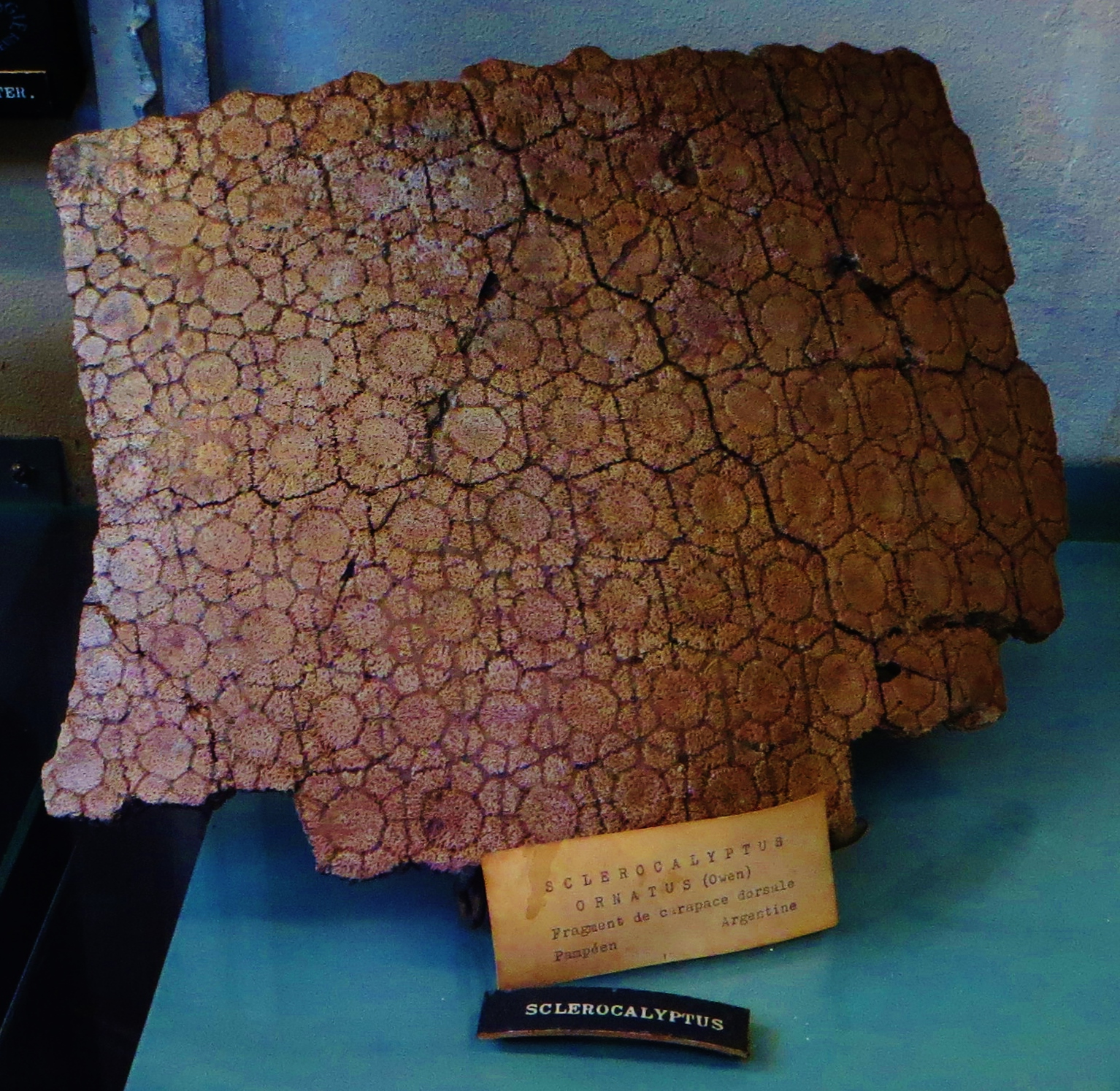
Fragment of the dorsal carapace of N. ornatus.

Neosclerocalyptus' carapace contains 50-55 transverse rows along the sides of the shell. The dorsal carapace osteoderms of Neosclerocalyptus preserve a "rossette" pattern, though the antero-ventrally placed ones lack the pattern, with a flat and sub-circular central figure, surrounded by a single row of 7 to 10 polygonal peripheral figures, similar to Propalaehoplophorus. The external morphology of the osteoderms varies in location, with rectangular osteoderms along the dorsal midline in single rows and circular osteoderms covering the middle, side, and proximal carapace portions. From the median part of the dorsal side of the carapace towards the lateral sides of the carapace, osteoderms are progressively smaller, while the central figures of them become more circular. At the anterior regions, the dorsal osteoderms become pentagonal or hexagonal and the central figures become more circular. In the most ventral-lateral region, osteoderms are rectangular with antero-posterior main axis for a wider coverage. On the anterior-dorsal parts of the carapace, osteoderms become more hexagonal, smaller, and flatter in contrast to those of the ventral-lateral region. Central figures tend to be more rounded, increasing in size, and slightly towards the posterior margin of the osteoderm. The osteoderms were thin, strongly sutured, and not depressed in their internal surface, contrary to the tall and robust osteoderms of Glyptodon and Panochthus. In the dorsal region, a slightly depressed smooth central figure was surrounded by a series of large polygonal figures often common to two contiguous plates; the furrows were sharp but narrow and shallow. A large hair holes were present around the cervical inlet. By moving away from the axis, the central figures became more prominent, and they came to occupy practically the entire surface of the small plaques on the side wings. Along the edges of the carapace, the central figure was enlarged and occupied a marginal position, due to the disappearance of the peripheral area along the free margin.

The tail was protected by four or five mobile rings, each consisting of two series of plates. The terminal part of the tail was protected by a bone tube, almost cylindrical, a little depressed and slightly curved upwards, which corresponded to ten vertebrae. This tube was equipped with two large convex terminal plaques, preceded by side plates that were reduced to the front of the tail, and which were separated from each other via two rows of peripheral figures. The rest of the surface of the caudal tube was made up of oval elements separated by a single series of small polygonal figures.

The head was protected by a large shield whose armor was well sutured, numerous and equipped with a little visible ornamentation. The profile of the skull was strongly convex, due to the development of frontal sinus; the nasal bones inclined downwards. The orbits were limited in the rear area by an apophysis of the zygomatic arch, which however did not come to join the front bones. The mandible's upright branch was very wide and inclined forward. The most front teeth were simple, while the rear ones were trilobed.

== Classification ==
Neosclerocalyptus represents one of the best known glyptodont genera, due to the significant fossil remains belonging to N. ornatus and the number of species. Neosclerocalyptus is part of the monogeneric tribe Neosclerocalyptini that is diagnosed from other Glyptodonts by 6 ambiguous synapomorphies, most of these being from the nasal anatomy and shape of the carapace. The tribe is the sister group to the Hoplophorini, which definitively contains Panochthus and Hoplophorus but may also include other genera like Lomaphorus and Palaehoplophorus, though these genera may be dubious. The classification of Neosclerocalyptus has changed many times, first being a Glyptodon species, but also being classified as a hoplophorin, "lomaphorin", and "sclerocalyptin".

The following phylogenetic analysis was conducted by Quiñones et al (2020), which included 5 named species of Neosclerocalyptus and 1 unnamed species:

- Glyptodontidae
  - Propalaehoplophorus
  - - Glyptodontinae
      - Boreostemma
      - - Glyptotherium
        - Glyptodon reticulatus
    - - - Plohophorus
        - - Doedicurinae
            - Doedicurus
            - Eleutherocercus
        - - Eosclerocalyptus
          - - Hoplophorini
              - Hoplophorus
              - - Panochthus tuberculatus
                - Panochthus intermedius
            - Neosclerocalyptini
              - Neosclerocalyptus sp.
              - - Neosclerocalyptus castellanosi
                - - Neosclerocalyptus pseudornatus
                  - - Neosclerocalyptus ornatus
                    - - Neosclerocalyptus gouldi
                      - Neosclerocalyptus paskoensis

The following phylogenetic analysis was conducted by Zurita et al (2013), which included 5 named species of Neosclerocalyptus.

- Glyptodontidae
  - Propalaehoplophorus
  - - Glyptodontinae
      - Boreostemma
      - - Glyptotherium
        - Glyptodon reticulatus
    - - - Cochlops
        - - Plohophorus
          - Doedicurus
          - - - Hoplophorus euphractus
              - Panochthus intermedius
            - - - - Neosclerocalyptus paskoensis
                  - Neosclerocalyptus gouldi
                - - Neosclerocalyptus ornatus
                  - - Neosclerocalyptus pseudornatus
                    - Neosclerocalyptus castellanosi

== Paleobiology and distribution ==
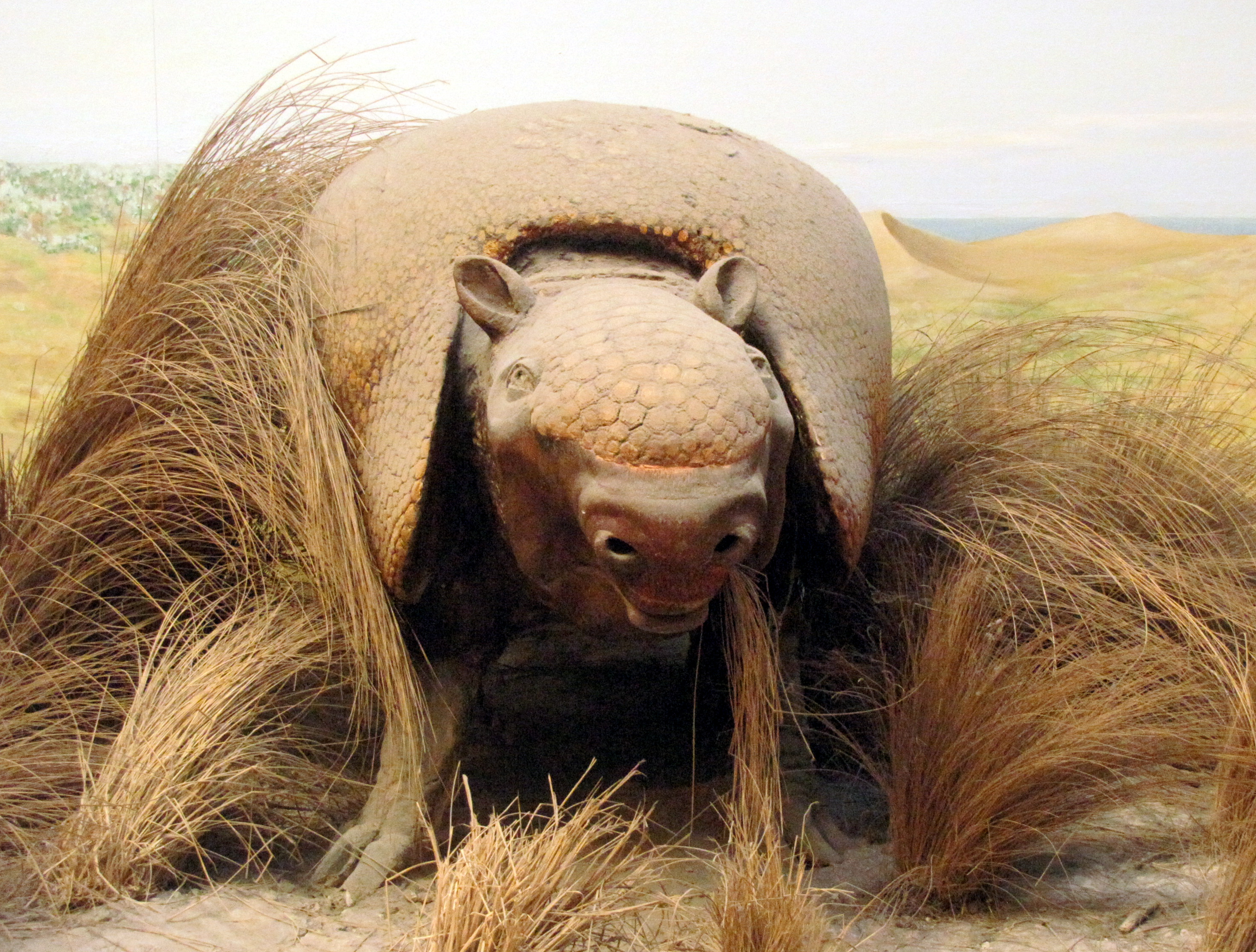
Model of N. ornatus in Museo de La Plata

Neosclerocalyptus is known from the Ensenadan-Lujanian (Early Pleistocene-Early Holocene) of Chubut, Buenos Aires, La Pampa, Córdoba, Mendoza, San Luis, Santa Fe, Entre Ríos, Corrientes, Chaco, Santiago del Estero, Tucumán, Formosa and Salta Provinces of Argentina, but also the Pleistocene of Uruguay, Paraguay, and Bolivia. Most records of Neosclerocalyptus come from colder and more arid environments, such as the Argentine Pampas and north-central Argentina, while fossils from warmer and humid environments are much more rare, such as in Argentine Mesopotamia and western Uruguay. The northernmost occurrence of the genus is from Nuapua and Santa Cruz de la Sierra localities in Bolivia, while the southernmost one is from Bahia Blanca in Buenos Aires Province. The oldest Neosclerocalyptus species is N. castellanosi from the Vorohuean (Late Pliocene), then there are N. pseudornatus and N. ornatus from the Ensenadan (early Pleistocene-middle Pleistocene), N. goudi comes from the Bonaerian (middle Pleistocene), and lastly N. paskoensis fossils date purely to the Lujanian (late Pleistocene-early Holocene). During the Ensenadan, the era in which the most Neosclerocalyptus fossils have been found, most of South America underwent a great cooling and more areas became open, arid spaces, though at certain intervals humid environments and rainforests would become more common. This is also reflected in the size of many of the taxa from this era, with mammal genera like Glyptodon, Doedicurus, Toxodon, and others reaching their peak sizes. N. pseudornatus is found in more tropical and even heterogenous environments than that of later species, but the species likely went extinct around 980kya as part of the "Great Patagonian Glaciation".

It seems that some morphological characteristics of Neosclerocalyptus (such as the strong development of the front-nasal sinus) allowed the animal to breathe easier in drier or colder environments than many other Glyptodonts. Indeed, the pneumatization and lateral expansion of the front-nasal sinuses progressively increased in the middle and late Pleistocene species of Neosclerocalyptus. The fossils of Neosclerocalyptus are more abundant in the areas of Argentina which were more arid during the Pleistocene, and are rarer in the areas where, in the Pleistocene, the climate was more humid and warm. Glyptodonts have hypsodont dentition, and the teeth also never stopped growing in life, so they are assumed to have fed predominantly on grass. However, they have unusual teeth compared to those of other mammals, featuring three lobes (except for the first two teeth, which have the usual two lobes). The tooth core is made of osteodentine, which is surrounded by a layer of orthodentine, and capped off by cementum instead of enamel. Neosclerocalyptus and its distant relative Neuryurus bear narrower muzzles and being less hypsodont than larger glyptodonts like Doedicurus, suggesting probable bulk-feeding for relatively open environments compared to earlier selective-feeding glyptodonts. This follows the environments known from the time, with large, flat, arid environments with many grazers. Dental mesowear of N. ornatus confirms that grass made up a substantial percentage of its diet, but also suggests it was a mixed feeder and not exclusively a grazer.

Based on a calculation of IFA valuyes of the humerus of Neosclerocalyptus, Neosclerocalyptus would have more cursorial habits than its relatives Glyptodon and Propalaehoplophorus.
