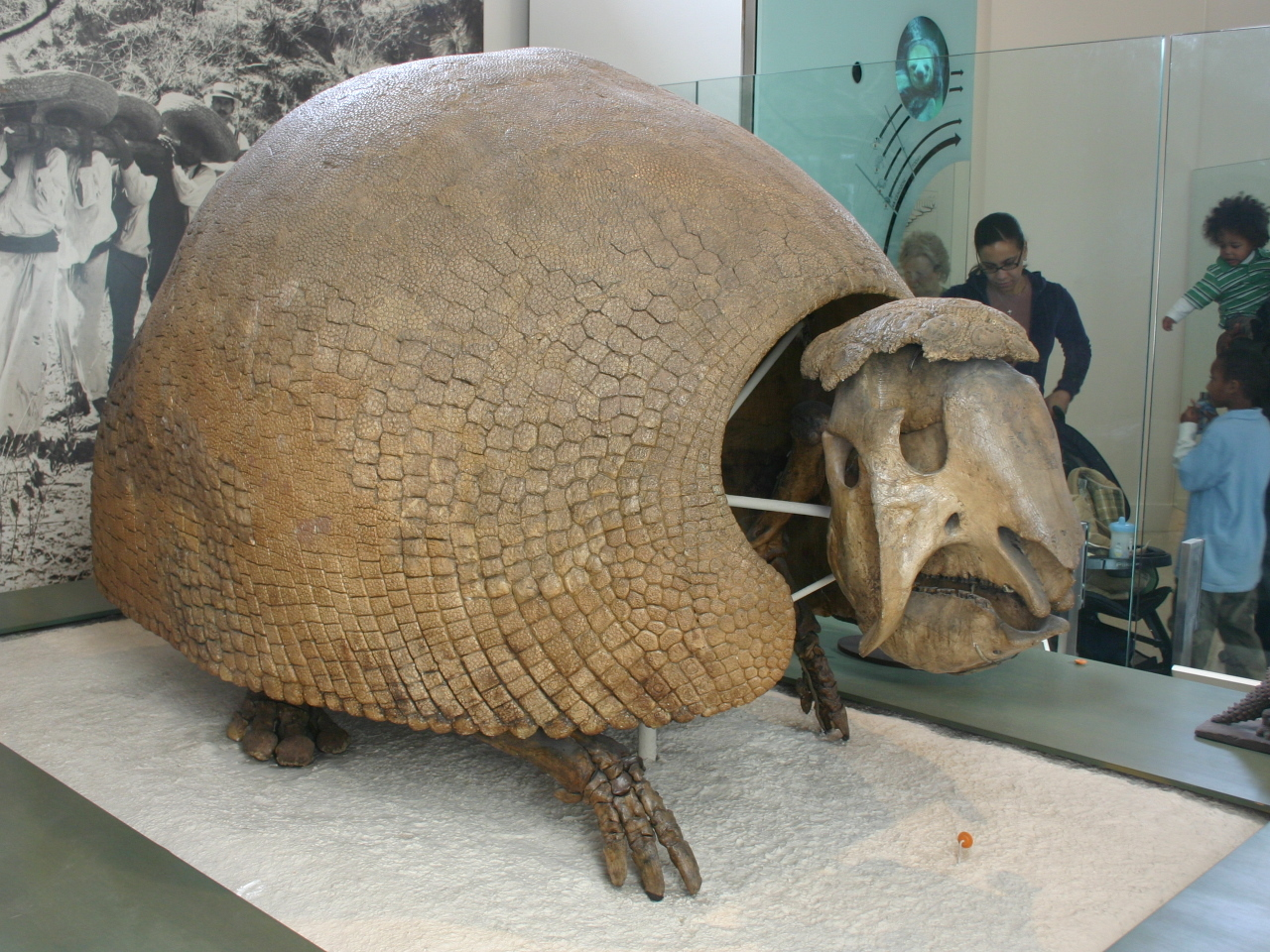
- P. frenzelianus
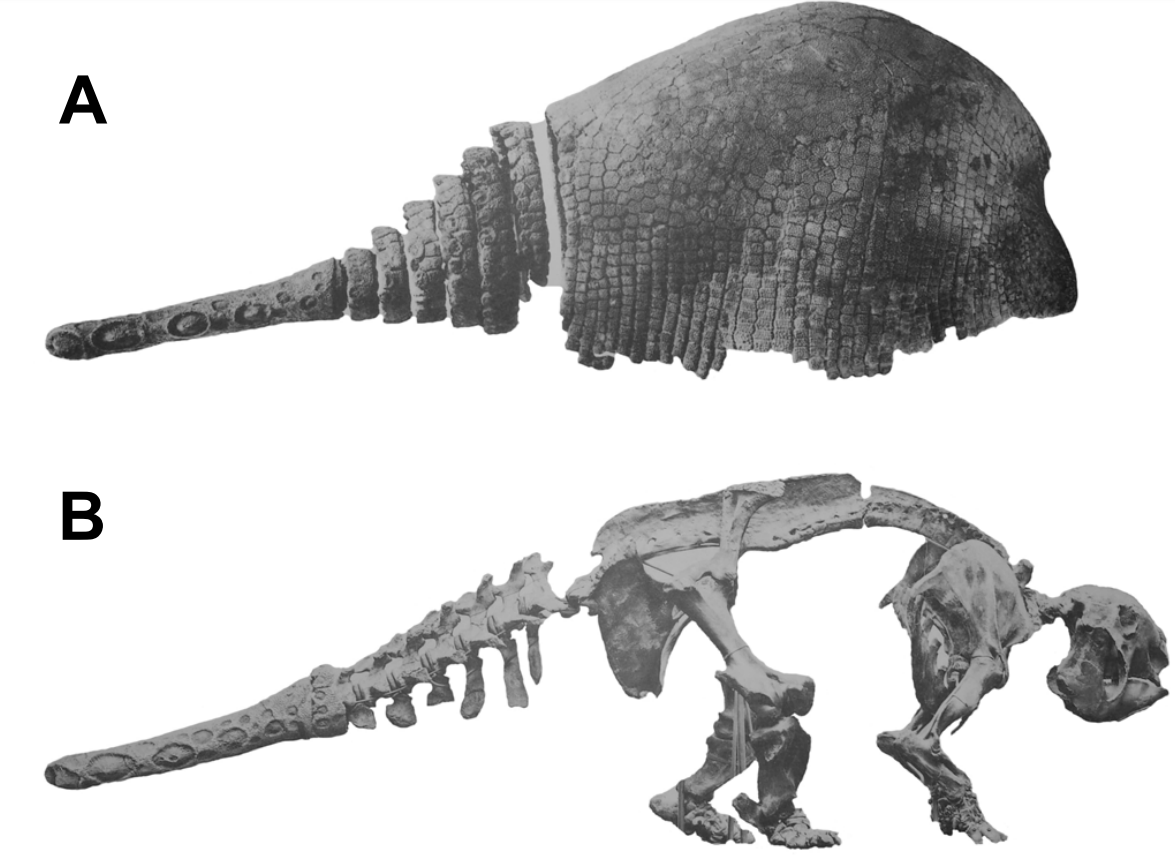
- Skeleton and shell of P. tuberculatus

Scientific classification
- Kingdom: Animalia
- Phylum: Chordata
- Class: Mammalia
- Order: Cingulata
- Family: Chlamyphoridae
- Subfamily: †Glyptodontinae
- Genus: †Panochthus; Burmeister, 1867

Type species
- †Panochthus tuberculatus Owen, 1845

Species
- †P. frenzelianus Ameghino, 1889; †P. florensis Brambilla, Lopez & Parent, 2020; †P. greslebini Castellanos, 1942; †P. hipsilis Zurita et al., 2017; †P. intermedius Lydekker, 1895; †P. jaguaribensis Moreia, 1965; †P. subintermedius Castellanos, 1937; †P. tuberculatus Owen, 1845
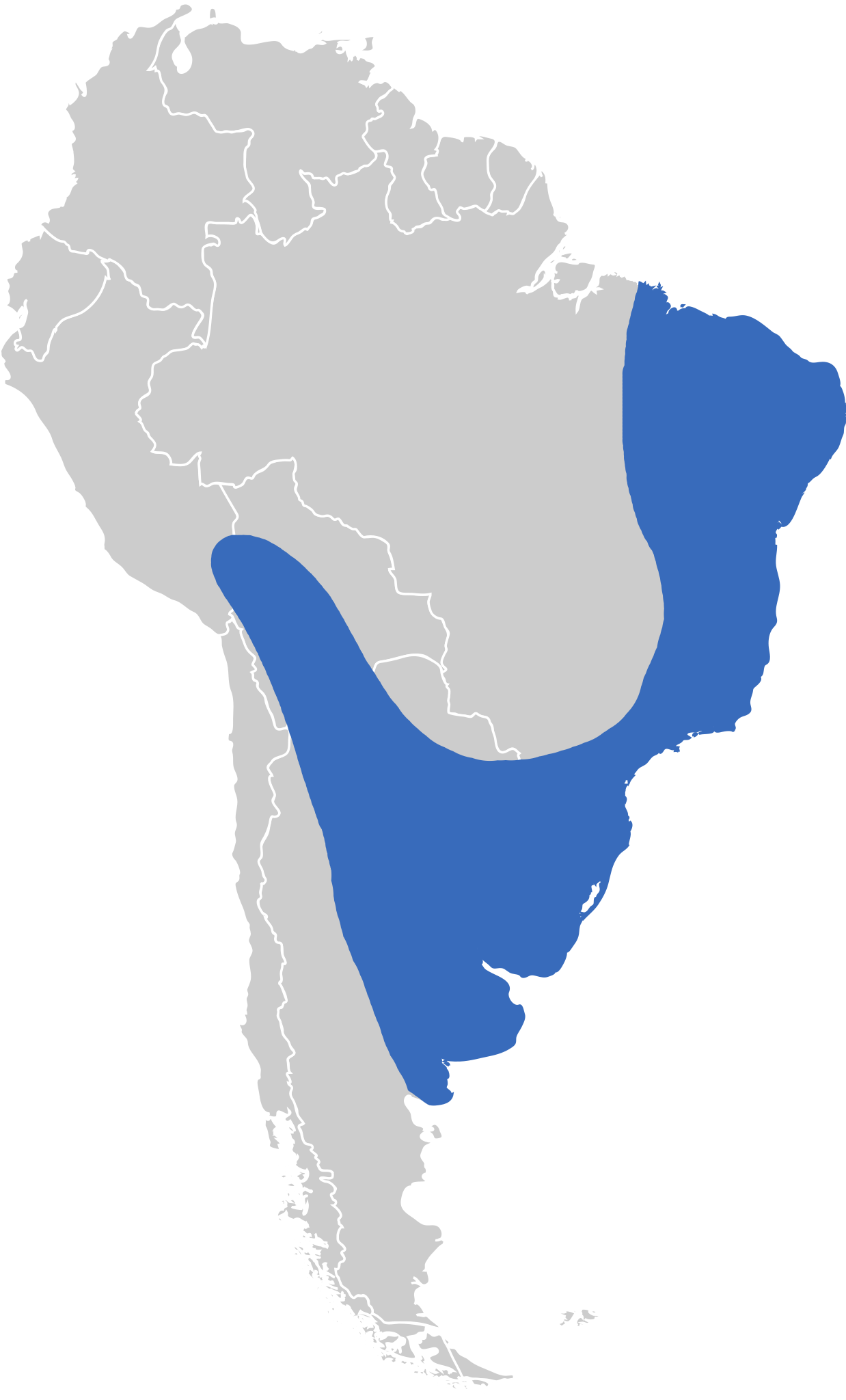
- Inferred range of the genus Panochthus based on known localities

Synonyms
- Synonyms of P. tuberculatus: P. lundii Burmeister, 1874; P. morenoi Ameghino, 1889; P. rusconii Castellanos, 1942; P. voghti Ameghino, 1889; Synonyms of P. greslebini: P. oliveiraroxoi Castellanos, 1942; P. rochai Couto, 1954

= Panochthus =

Panochthus Temporal range: ~2.588–0.012 Ma Pleistocene

Extinct genus of mammals

Panochthus is an extinct genus of glyptodont, which lived in the Gran Chaco-Pampean region of Argentina (Lujan, Yupoí and Agua Blanca Formations), Brazil (Jandaíra Formation), Bolivia (Tarija and Ñuapua Formations), Paraguay and Uruguay (Sopas and Dolores Formations) during the Pleistocene epoch. The first specimen of Panochthus consisted of two carapace (shell) fragments, now lost, recovered from Buenos Aires. In 1845, the fragments were referred by Sir Richard Owen to the genus Glyptodon. In 1864, working from more complete remains, Karl Hermann Konrad Burmeister erected Panochthus as a subgenus. Three years later, he elevated it to the rank of genus. The species named by Owen, now P. tuberculatus, stands as the type species, though many others have since been named.

The internal systematics of Panochthus have long been debated. At least twenty species have been named. While some have been reclassified, rendered invalid, or synonymised with existing species, at least nine remain valid. Mitochondrial DNA analyses suggest that Panochthus, like all other glyptodonts, is part of the armadillo family Chlamyphoridae. In 2022, glyptodonts were divided into two main clades: "traditional glyptodontines", and the "Austral clade"; Panochthus is part of the latter, and specifically the tribe Hoplophorini, which also includes Hoplophorus (and possibly Propanochthus, although that may be a species of Panochthus).

Panochthus was generally a large glyptodont, though body size varied between species. The biggest skulls known from the genus have been assigned to P. tuberculatus, measuring 394–442 mm (15.5–17.4 in), while the smallest, that of P. frenzelianus, instead measured 330 mm (13 in). As a genus, Panochthus is characterised by having a skull far deeper than it is long, a downturned nasal region, and three-cusped, molar-like teeth. In some species, the back of the orbit (eye socket) was encircled by a so-called postorbital bar, though this was not true for others. The armour of Panochthus, as in other glyptodonts, consisted of four primary structures: the cephalic shield, which topped the head; the dorsal carapace, which covered the body; the caudal rings, which encircled the base of the tail; and the caudal tube, a rigid mass which covered the last half or so of the tail. In P. intermedius, the caudal tube bears large depressions similar to those seen in Doedicurus, suggesting the presence of conical spines.

== Taxonomy ==
=== Early history ===
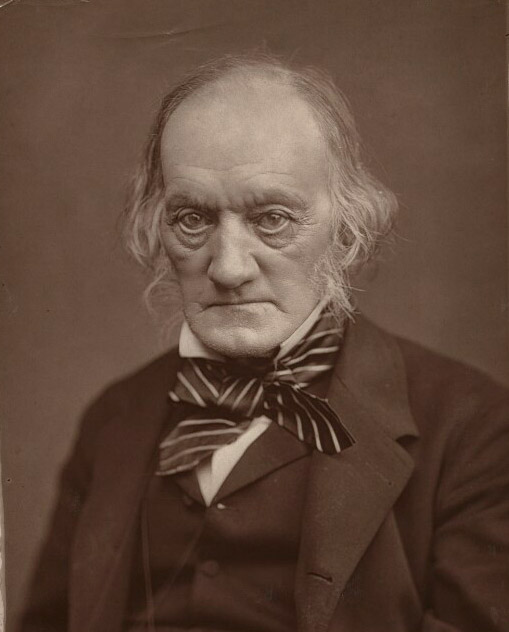
Portrait of Sir Richard Owen, describer of the fragments which would later form the (now lost) syntypes of Panochthus.

The two syntypes of Panochthus, consisting of two dorsal carapace (shell) fragments recovered in the pampas of Buenos Aires, Argentina were described by English biologist and palaeontologist Sir Richard Owen, in an 1845 work cataloguing the bird and mammal fossils housed in the Royal College of Surgeons of England. Owen assigned them to the existing genus Glyptodon as a new species, G. tuberculatus. The holotype was subsequently lost, though has since been replaced by a neotype. Ten years after Owen's paper, naturalist Léonard Nodot re-examined the fossils. He described additional elements, also from the carapace. Noting a degree of carapace flexibility not observed in Glyptodon, he reassigned it to the genus Schistopleurum, which has itself been subsumed into the former genus. Between 1864 and 1874, Karl Hermann Konrad Burmeister (writing under the name Carlos Germán Conrado Burmeister) published extensively on the taxon published on by Nodot and Owen. His first study, published in 1864, focused on a specimen recovered in 1851 from the Luján River, by Comandante Albornoz. The specimen in question consisted of a complete caudal tube, the arrangement of scutes lining the caudal (tail) vertebrae. In that first study, Burmeister sunk S. tuberculatus back into Glyptodon, this time as a subgenus (Panochthus) of its own. Soon after, he became aware of a more complete specimen, recovered from Villa Mercedes. The specimen consisted of a complete skeleton, the cephalic shield (the scutes on top of the skull), the dorsal carapace, and the caudal tube. Following the discovery of this specimen, Burmeister would, in 1867, elevate Panochthus to genus level. In the last of his papers, published in 1874, Burmeister named a new Panochthus species, P. bullifer, whose remains were recovered from the Sierras de Córdoba mountains. While this species was briefly moved to Propanochthus, it has since been removed from that genus, and is once again considered a member of Panochthus.

=== Internal systematics ===
Since the description of P. tuberculatus, multiple species of Panochthus have been described. While many are valid, many others are either junior synonyms of others (i.e. P. oliveiraroxoi and P. rochai, both synonyms of P. greslebini), meaning that they are misidentified members of existing taxa, or nomina nuda (i.e. P. beyrichi and P. vogti), meaning that they were not properly described, and that their names thus do not apply to a specific taxon.

Comparative table of all named Panochthus species
Taxon	Status	Author(s) of taxon	Taxon publication year	Countr(ies) of origin
P. beyrichi	Nomen nudum	Roth	1888	
P. brocherii	Nomen nudum	Moreno	1888	
P. bullifer	May be a genus of its own, Propanochthus, or a Panochthus species	Burmeister	1874	Argentina
P. eocenus	Nomen nudum	Scalabrini	1887	
P. florensis	Valid	Brambilla, Lopez & Parent	2020	Argentina
P. frenzelianus	Valid	Ameghino	1889	Probably Argentina
P. greslebini	Valid	Castellanos	1942	Brazil and Argentina
P. hipsilis	Valid	Zurita et al.	2017	Bolivia
P. intermedius	Valid	Lydekker	1895	
P. jaguaribensis	Valid	Moreira	1965	Brazil
P. lundii	Valid	Burmeister	1874	
P. morenoi	Invalid. Type specimen now serves as neotype for P. tuberculatus	Ameghino	1881	
P. oliveiraroxoi	Synonym of B. greslebini	Castellanos	1942	
P. rochai	Synonym of B. greslebini	Paula Couto	1954	
P. rusconii	Valid	Castellanos	1942	
P. subintermedius	Valid, though initially a nomen nudum	Castellanos	1937	
P. trouessarti	Now Phlyctaenopyga	Moreno	1888	
P. tuberculatus	Valid	Owen	1845	Argentina, Bolivia, Brazil, Paraguay, and Uruguay
P. voghti	Synonym of P. tuberculatus	Ameghino	1889	
P. vogti	Nomen nudum	Roth	1888	

=== Classification ===
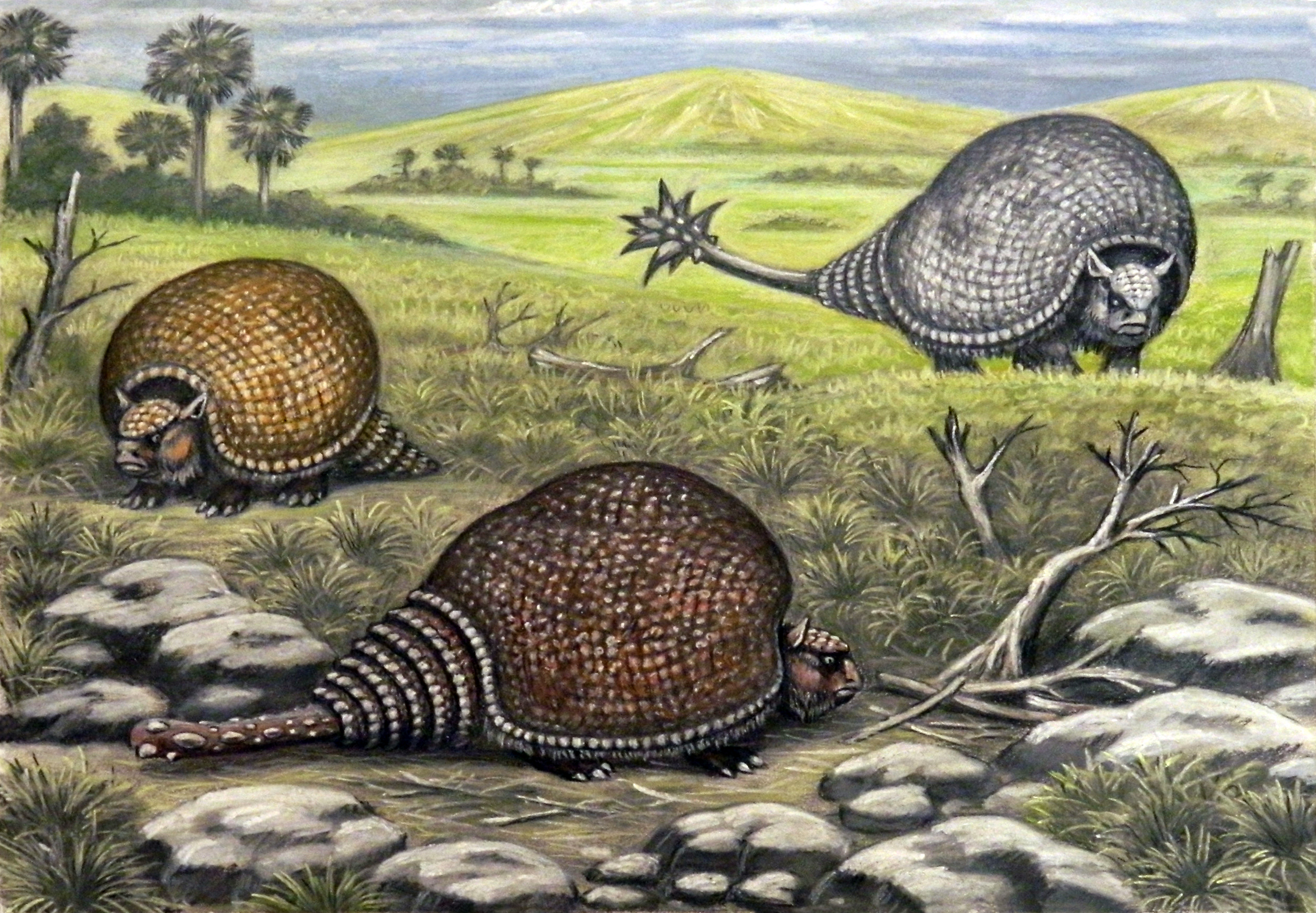
Three glyptodonts: Glyptodon (left), part of the traditional glyptodontine clade, and Panochthus (middle), and Doedicurus (right), part of the Austral clade

While initially believed to form a family of their own, glyptodonts are currently regarded as a subfamily of the armadillo family Chlamyphoridae, based on mtDNA analysis. Glyptodontinae can be further divided, per Daniel Barasoain et al. (2022), into two clades: traditional glyptodontines, including genera close to Glyptodon, and the "Austral clade", containing the majority of glyptodont diversity and likely originating in South America. There is some disagreement over where Panochthus falls in the glyptodontine tree. In 2013, Martín Zamorano and Diego Brandoni recovered it as the sister genus to Hoplophorus in all trees, with their analysis suggesting that the two genera sat apart from other glyptodonts in what is now defined as the Austral clade. Barasoain et al. (2022), however, recovered a different topology. In their phylogeny, the Austral clade consists of multiple loosely assorted genera, and two smaller clades: Doedicurinae, and most relevantly, Hoplophorini. This tribe includes Hoplophorus, Panochthus, and Propanochthus (or Panochthus bullifer). This contradicts the topology recovered by Zamorano and Brandoni, who recovered P. bullifer as part of "Plohoplophorini".

A genus-level cladogram of glyptodonts, based on the results of Barasoin et al. (2022), is as follows:

- Glyptodonts
  - Traditional Glyptodontinae
    - Boreostemma
    - - Glyptotherium
      - Glyptodon
  - "Austral clade"
    - Propalaehoplophorus
    - - Eucinepeltus
      - - Cochlops
        - Palaehoplophorus
        - - Kelenkura
          - - Eosclerocalyptus
            - - - - Plohophorus
                  - Pseudohoplophorus
                - Doedicurinae
                  - Doedicurus
                  - Eleutherocercus
              - - Neosclerocalyptus
                - Hoplophorini
                  - Hoplophorus
                  - - Propanochthus
                    - Panochthus

== Description ==
Panochthus was a large glyptodont. The largest species, P. intermedius, is so much larger than other species that its body size is considered a diagnostic characteristic. The smallest species, P. hipsilis, had a dorsal carapace roughly two-thirds the length of P. intermedius' dorsal carapace.

=== Skull and dentition ===
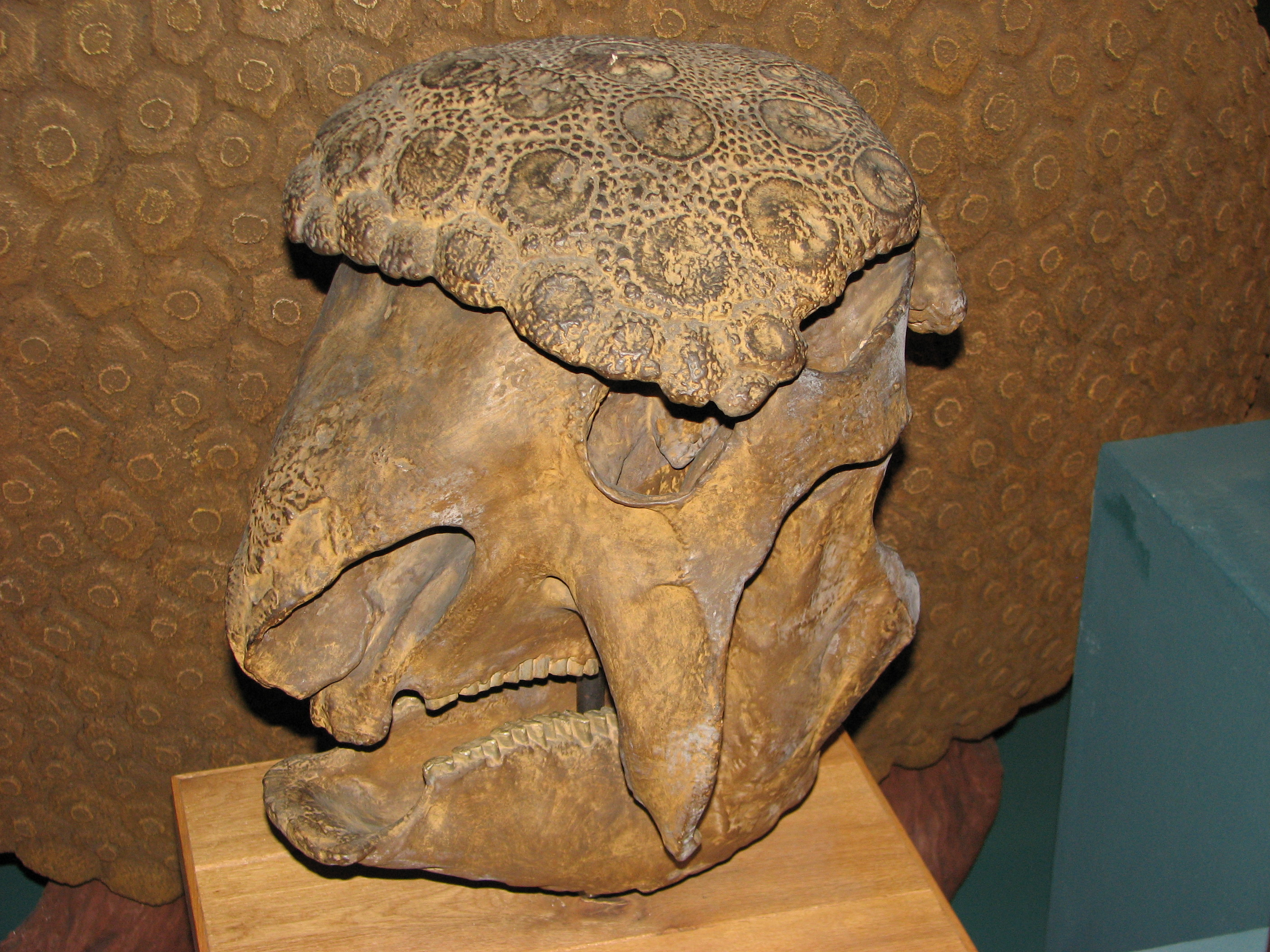
Skull of Panochthus

The skull of Panochthus differs in size depending on the species. When measured from the front of the nasal aperatures to the upper margin of the foramen magnum, P. tuberculatus skulls were the biggest, ranging from 394–442 mm (15.5–17.4 in); the known skull of P. frenzelianus was far smaller, measuring only 330 mm (13 in) in length. The skull was generally far deeper than long. The nasal region was inclined somewhat ventrally, sloping downwards (ventrally) at a 45° angle, and the external nares (nasal openings) were oriented forwards and downwards (fronto-ventrally). In P. hipsilis, this was less exaggerated. The sinuses of the frontal and nasal are highly developed. This has led to suggestions that the unusual nasal structure of Panochthus is an adaptation for thermoregulation. The presence or absence of a postorbital bar, a bony protrusion which closed the orbits (eye sockets) towards the back (posteriorly), differed between species. P. hipsilis and P. tuberculatus both had postorbital bars, while the remaining species had orbits which were open posteriorly. In most Panochthus species, the postorbital process sat between the orbital and temporal fossae. P. tuberculatus was unique among its genus, though akin to Doedicurus and Neosclerocalyptus, in having a complete postorbital process.

Like other glyptodonts, Panochthus' teeth were all molariform, resembling molars. The molariforms of glyptodonts were hypselodont (high-crowned), lack roots, and grew continuously. All of Panochthus' teeth were trilobed, bearing three distinct cusps. In P. tuberculatus, the first upper molariforms were more rounded than the others, whereas in an unnamed species, they were subelliptical. The first lower molariforms of P. tuberculatus were trilobed labially (on the outside), while those further back in the mouth were all trilobed in the typical fashion.

=== Postcranial skeleton ===
The humeri of P. tuberculatus were smaller than that of P. subintermedius. The deltopectoral crest was well-developed, and in the former species took on a V-shape, whereas in the latter, it was convex and deflected outwards. In all Panochthus species, the deltopectoral crest had a smooth surface. The distal epiphysis of the humerus had an entepicondylar foramen, as in related glyptodonts. The femora of P. greslebini and P. tuberculatus were more gracile than those of P. subintermedius. As in other glyptodonts, the epiphyses were more well-developed transversely (across) than anteroposteriorly (from front-to-back). In P. tuberculatus, unlike Neosclerocalyptus and Propalaehoplophorus, the greater trochanter sat in a slightly higher plane compared to the femoral head.

=== Armour ===
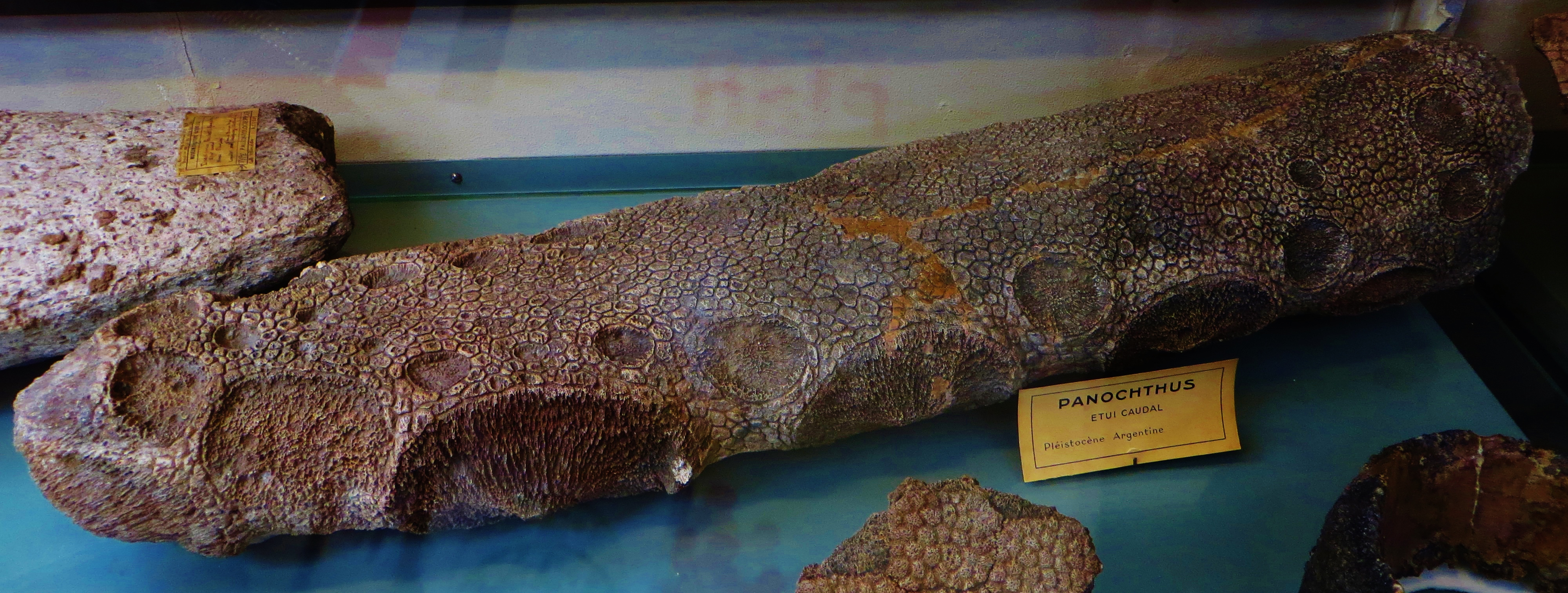
Caudal tube of Panochthus sp.

The armour of Panochthus, as in other glyptodonts, consisted of multiple structures. The skull was capped by a cephalic shield, a large mass of bone covered in small osteoderms; the osteoderms of P. frenzelianus' cephalic shield, as originally noted by Ameghino, were smaller than in other species. Over the torso was the dorsal carapace, a large structure consisting of numerous transverse rows. The armour of the tail consisted of multiple structures: a set of smaller caudal ring for around the first half, and then a fused caudal tube for the distal half. Pathologies to the caudal vertebrae suggest that the caudal tube was used in agonistic interactions both with other Panochthus and possibly with other taxa. Two different caudal tube morphologies are observed in Panochthus: a thick, cylindrical morphology; and a flatter morphology, compared to a Viking sword, minus the hilt. Panochthus with the latter caudal tube morphology could likely deliver more efficient horizontal blows. In P. intermedius, the lateral margins of the caudal tube bore a series of large depressions, which may have anchored conical spines, similar to those proposed for Doedicurus.

=== Soft tissue preservation ===
One specimen of Panochthus sp. preserved three tracheal rings, C-shaped cartilaginous structures which would have supported the trachea while allowing it to remain flexible. While tracheal rings are known from other extinct clades, including non-avian dinosaurs, Panochthus sp. is the first fossil mammal to preserve them.

== Palaeobiology ==
=== Hyoid apparatus ===
Panochthus is one of few glyptodonts (alongside Glypotodon cf. clavipes) to preserve the hyoid apparatus, a bony structure which would have supported the tongue, controlled air flow, and possibly modulated vocalisations. The hyoid of Panochthus is longer and more gracile than that of Glyptodon cf. clavipes, and had more well-developed musculature, suggesting a more flexible tongue and a different feeding method to that genus.
