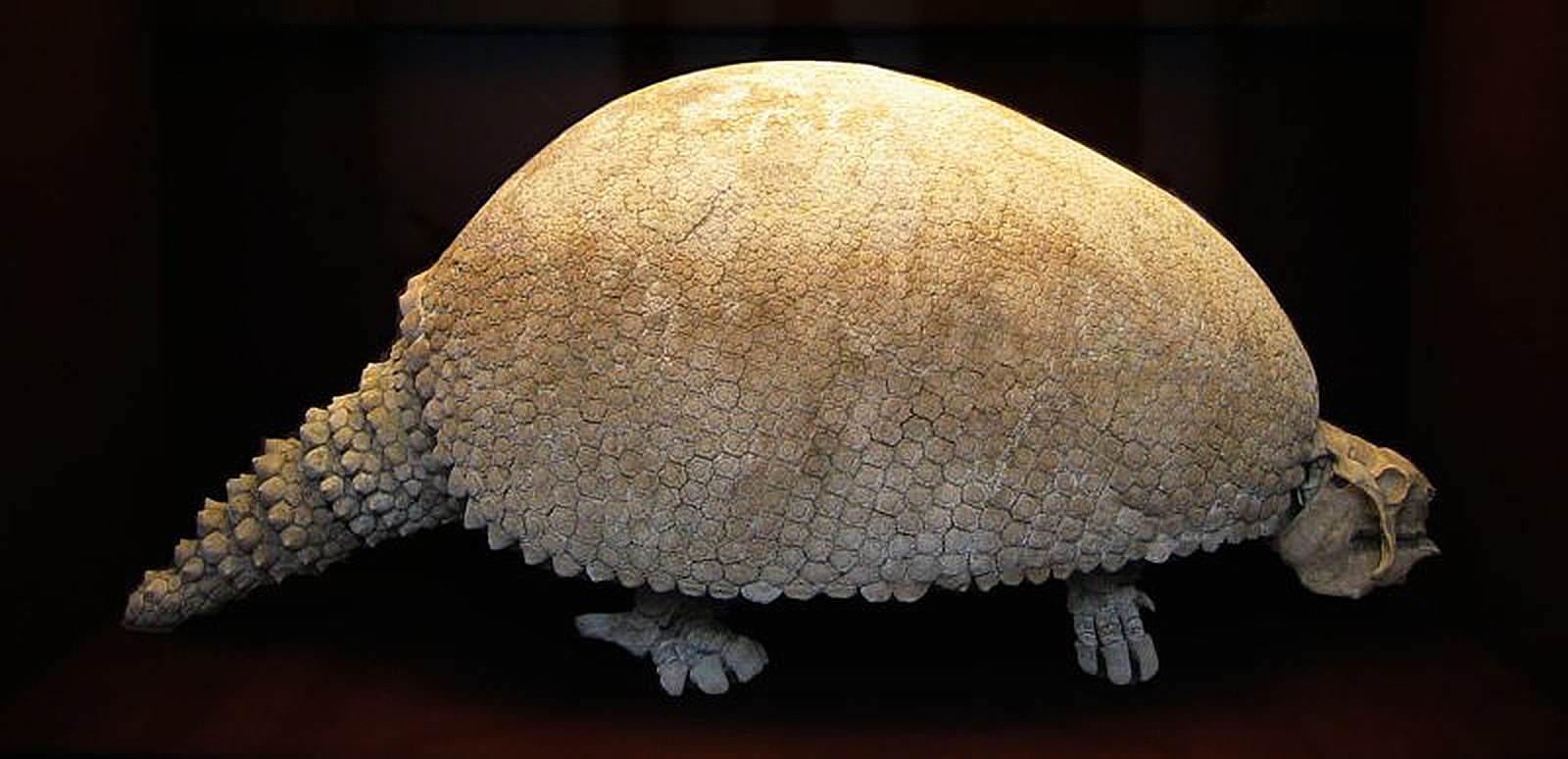
- Skeleton of G. reticulatus at the Naturhistorisches Museum, Vienna

Scientific classification
- Kingdom: Animalia
- Phylum: Chordata
- Class: Mammalia
- Order: Cingulata
- Family: Chlamyphoridae
- Subfamily: †Glyptodontinae
- Genus: †Glyptodon; Owen, 1839

Type species
- †Glyptodon clavipes Owen, 1839

Other Species
- †G. elongatus? Burmeister, 1866; †G. jatunkhirkhi Cuadrelli et al., 2020; †G. munizi Ameghino, 1881; †G. reticulatus Owen, 1845
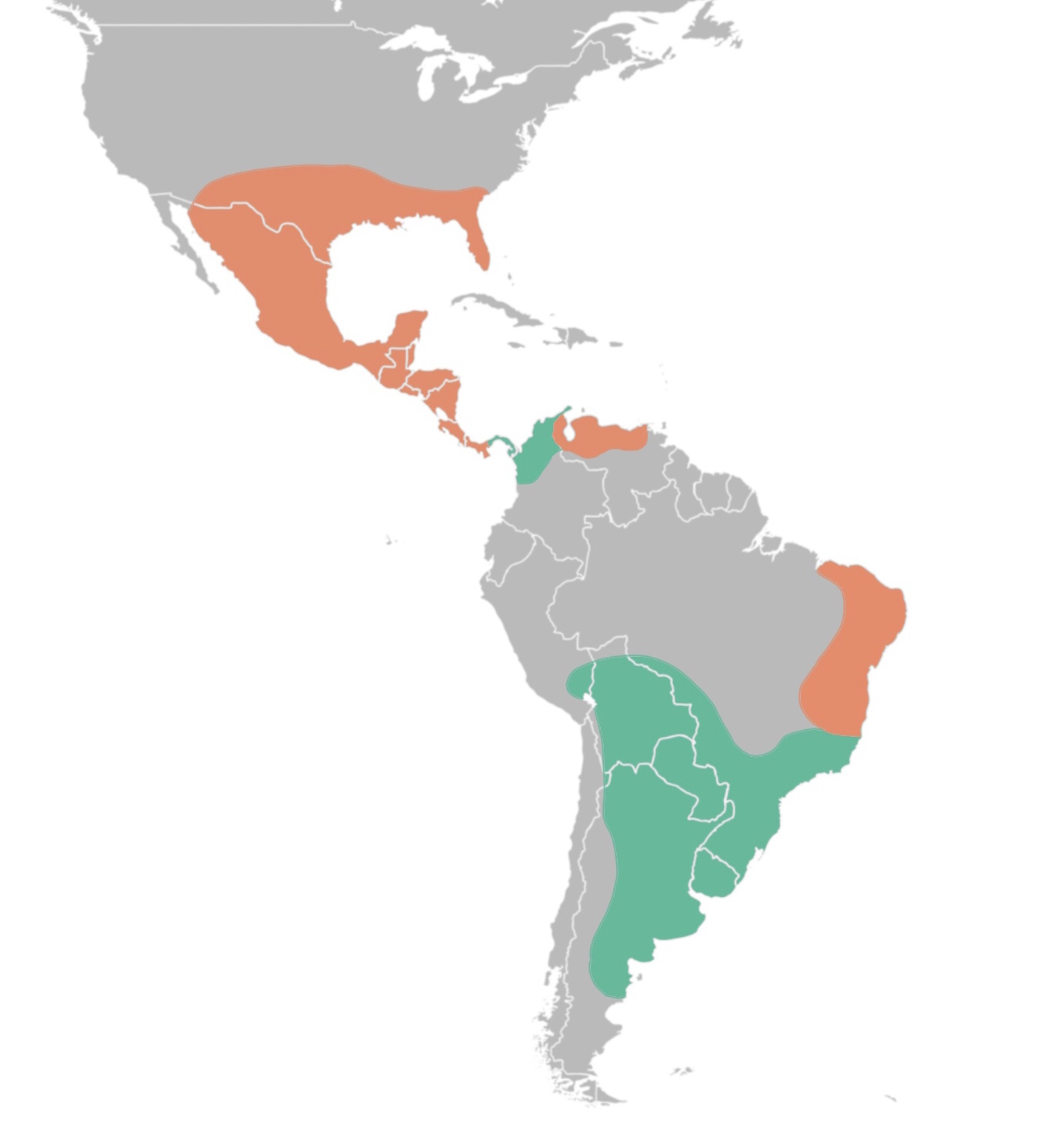
- Distribution of Glyptodon (green) compared to Glyptotherium's (orange).

Synonyms
- Genus synonymy: Chlamydotherium Bronn, 1838; Glyptocoileus Castellanos, 1952; Glyptopedius Castellanos, 1953; Glyptostracon Castellanos, 1953; Heteroglyptodon Roselli, 1976; Lepitherium Sainte-Hilaire, 1831; Neothoracophorus Ameghino, 1889; Orycterotherium Bronn, 1838; Pachypus D'Alton, 1839; Paraglypytodon Castellanos, 1943; Schistopleurum Nodot, 1857; Stromatherium Castellanos, 1953; Thoracophorus Gervais and Ameghino, 1888 (preoccupied); Synonyms of G. clavipes: G. subelevatus Nodot, 1854; Synonyms of G. reticulatus: G. typus Nodot, 1857; Schistopleurum typus (Nodot, 1857); G. robustus Burmeister, 1866; G. asper Burmeister, 1866; Hoplophorus asper (Burmeister, 1866); Schistopleurum asperus (Burmeister, 1866); Dubious species: Paraglyptodon uquiensis Castellanos, 1943; Glyptodon uquiensis (Castellanos, 1943); Heteroglyptodon genuarioi Roselli, 1976

= Glyptodon =

Glyptodon Temporal range: Pliocene?-Pleistocene (Montehermosan?–Lujanian) ~3.200–0.011 Ma

Genus of large, heavily armored mammals

Glyptodon (lit. 'grooved or carved tooth'; from Ancient Greek γλυπτός (gluptós) 'sculptured' and ὀδοντ-, ὀδούς (odont-, odoús) 'tooth') is a genus of glyptodont, an extinct group of large, herbivorous armadillos that lived from the Pliocene, around 3.2 million years ago, to the early Holocene, around 11,000 years ago, in South America. It is one of, if not the, best-known genera of glyptodont. Glyptodon has a long and storied past, being the first named extinct cingulate and the type genus of the subfamily Glyptodontinae. Fossils of Glyptodon have been recorded as early as 1814 from Pleistocene aged deposits from Uruguay, though many were incorrectly referred to the ground sloth Megatherium by early paleontologists.

The type species, G. clavipes, was described in 1839 by notable British paleontologist Sir Richard Owen. Later in the 19th century, dozens of complete skeletons were unearthed from localities and described by paleontologists such as Florentino Ameghino and Hermann Burmeister. During this era, many species of Glyptodon were dubbed, some of them based on fragmentary or isolated remains. Fossils from North America were also assigned to Glyptodon, but all of them have since been placed in the closely related genus Glyptotherium. It was not until the later end of the 1900s and 21st century that full review of the genus came about, restricting Glyptodon to just five species under one genus.

Glyptodonts were typically large, quadrupedal (four-legged), herbivorous armadillos with armored carapaces (top shell) that were made of hundreds of interconnected osteoderms (structures in dermis composed of bone). Other pieces of armor covered the tails and skull roofs, the skull being tall with hypsodont (high-crowned) teeth. As for the postcranial anatomy, pelves fused to the carapace, an amalgamate vertebral column, short limbs, and small digits are found in glyptodontines. Glyptodon reached up to 2 meters (6.56 feet) long and 400 kilograms (880 pounds) in weight, making it one of the largest glyptodontines known. Glyptodon is morphologically and phylogenetically most similar to Glyptotherium, however they differ in several ways. Glyptodon is larger on average, with an elongated carapace, a relatively shorter tail, and a robust zygoma, or cheek bone.

Glyptodonts existed for millions of years, though Glyptodon itself was one of its last surviving members. Glyptodon was one of many South American megafauna, with many native groups such as notoungulates and ground sloths reaching immense sizes. Glyptodon had a mixed diet of grasses and other plants, instead living at the edge forests and grasslands where the shrubbery was lower. Glyptodon had a wide muzzle, an adaptation for bulk feeding. The armor could have protected the animal from predators, of which many coexisted with Glyptodon, including the "saber-tooth cat" Smilodon, the large canid Protocyon, and the giant bear Arctotherium.

Glyptodon, along with all other glyptodonts, became extinct at the end of the Late Pleistocene, around 12,000 years ago as part of the Late Pleistocene extinctions, along with most large mammals in the Americas. Evidence of hunting of glyptodonts by recently arrived Paleoindians suggests that humans may have been a causal factor in the extinctions.

== History ==
=== Early history ===
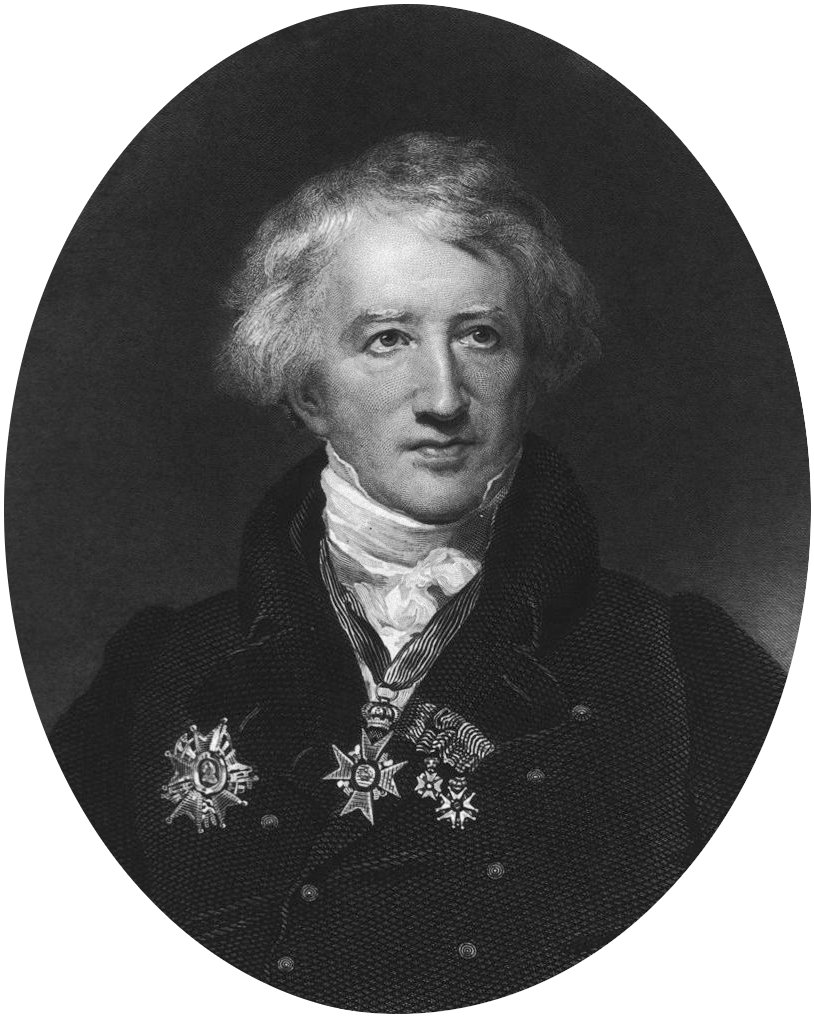
Georges Cuvier (1769–1832), describer of Megatherium

The history and taxonomy of Glyptodon is storied and convoluted. Between 1752 and 1756, British missionary Thomas Falkner was the first to record the discovery of glyptodonts, a carapace found in the Carcaraña River in what is now Santa Fe, Argentina. The indigenous writer Garcilaso de la Vega Inga hypothesized that they came from a giant human who was "destroyed by God for the crime of sodomy". However, Falkner stated that they belonged to a giant armadillo, which would prove to be accurate. In 1814, Uruguayan priest, scientist, soldier, and later politician Dámaso Antonio Larrañaga wrote about the discovery of several unusual fossils in his Diario de Historia Natural. This work included his descriptions of many new species of ants, birds, mammals, and even one of the first figures of the extinct Megatherium, a genus of giant ground sloth. The glyptodont fossils included of a femur (thighbone), carapace (shell) fragments, and a caudal tube (an armored tail covering) that he collected from a Pleistocene-aged (ca. 2.5-0.011 mya) deposit on the banks of the Solís Grande Creek in southern Uruguay. Larrañaga identified the fossils as those of Dasypus (Megatherium), believing that Megatherium was a subgenus of Dasypus because the osteoderms were found associated with a specimen of Megatherium. This misled other paleontologists to believe that Megatherium was an armored giant sloth, an idea followed by French paleontologist Georges Cuvier. Cuvier went on to describe Megatherium in 1796, which sparked a new wave of European colonial and scientific interest in South America. In this period, South America's rich natural history, especially its fossils, were plundered and sold to European scientists and institutions. Often, these fossils were mixed together, had vague locality information, and were damaged because of poor packing. Larrañaga wrote to French scientist Auguste Saint Hilaire about the discovery, and an extract from the letter was reproduced by Cuvier in 1823 in the eighth volume of his landmark book Recherches sur les ossemens fossiles. Larrañaga also noted that similar fossils had been found in "analogous strata near Lake Mirrim, on the frontier of the Portuguese colonies" (southern Brazil).

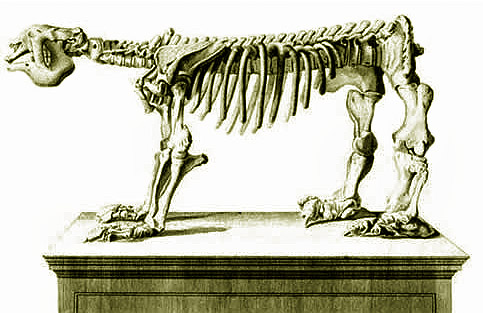
A skeleton of Megatherium, which was confused with Glyptodon for decades.

In the 1820s, Prussian explorer Friedrich Sellow discovered a host of glyptodont fossils in two different locales; a femur and caudal tube (an armored tail covering known in glyptodonts) from the Queguay Grande River in northern Uruguay, and a carapace from the Arapey Grande River. In 1827, German mineralogist Christian Samuel Weiss regarded the carapace as coming from Megatherium as well, while the caudal tube was stated to be a palm tree trunk. Weiss and other paleontologists noted that the osteoderms closely resembled those of armadillos, but Cuvier's hypothesis was popularized based on the incorrect referral of glyptodontine osteoderms to Megatherium. British naturalist William Clift backed this view in 1835 when describing some glyptodont fossils from the Salado River, stating they came from Megatherium. In 1831, French paleontologist Geoffroy Saint-Hilaire informally named some osteoderms discovered by Sellow as coming from a Teleosaurus-like reptile, which he dubbed lepitherium.

However, an 1833 paper by German scientist Eduard Joseph d'Alton argued that Sellow's fossils came from an armadillo, not Megatherium. Here, d'Alton he described more of the material sent by Sellow, including portions of the limbs, manus (hands), and shoulder girdle. These he compared to Dasypus and Chlamyphorus, leading him to conclude that the fossils unearthed by Sellow came from a close relative of living armadillos rather than Megatherium. In 1836, this hypothesis was supported by French naturalist Charles Léopold Laurillard, who mentioned that a plaster cast of a large armadillo carapace represented a distinct taxon from Megatherium and that the armor referred to the sloth was instead from an armadillo. The modern consensus is that many of the osteoderms, carapaces, and caudal tubes mistakenly assigned to Megatherium come from Glyptodon instead. In 1837, Danish paleontologist Peter Wilhelm Lund was the first to scientifically describe a glyptodont, Hoplophorus, based on osteoderms, teeth, skull bones, and other fossils found in Lagoa Santa, Brazil. Following the discovery of Hoplophorus, a multitude of other glyptodont genera were named, such as Chlamydotherium and Orycterotherium in 1838, and Pachypus in 1839. In December 1838, Uruguayan naturalist Teodoro Vilardebó and politician Bernardo Berro discovered a well preserved Glyptodon skeleton in the Arroyo del Pedernal Grande, Uruguay. Between December 9 and 14, the skeleton was unearthed while between March 31 and April 5 it was described in a series of newspaper articles. In their last installment, they named the new species Dasypus antiquus, making it the first species name formally assigned to Glyptodon. Although the valid name for Glyptodon, this discovery received little recognition because of a language barrier between South American and European scientific journals. Furthermore, European scientists, especially the British, had their own desire to take taxonomic priority over Glyptodon before it was named.

=== Glyptodon clavipes ===
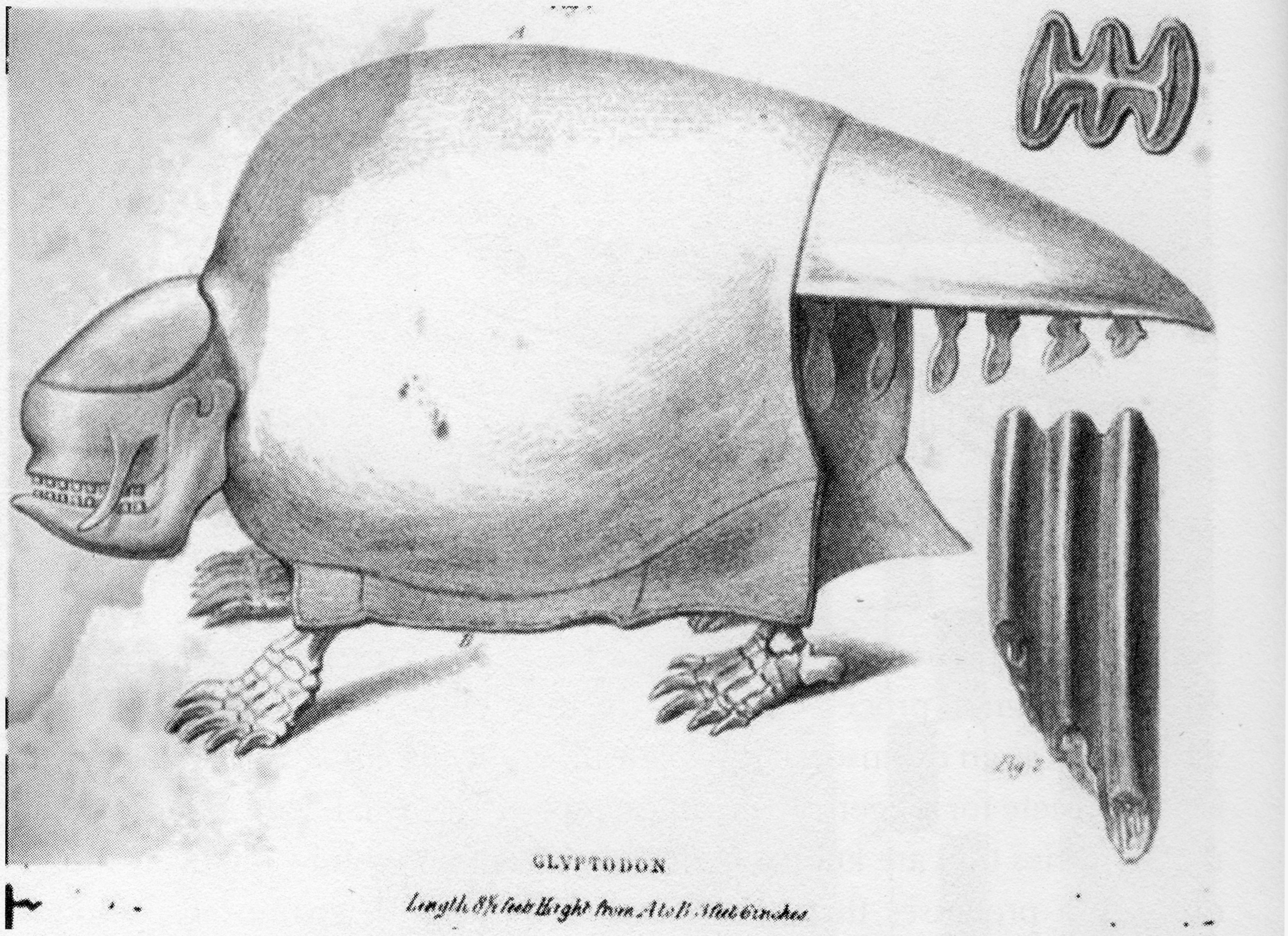
Richard Owen's 1838 reconstruction of a Glyptodon skeleton; with the namesake tooth on the right

One of several European fossil traders who unearthed Glyptodon remains and/or sold them to European museums and collections was British diplomat Sir Woodbine Parish. He worked with a web of fossil traders to procure fossils from Argentine and Uruguayan locales and sell them back to European institutions. At the same time as Parish's discoveries, British naturalist Charles Darwin was on the second voyage of the HMS Beagle, wherein he discovered several Megatherium and Glyptodon fossils in southern South America. Once these fossils made it to the RC, it was soon recognized that the carapaces and osteoderms ascribed to Megatherium by earlier authors derived from their own taxon. In 1838, Parish received an isolated molariform (cheek tooth) attached to a letter containing information on the discovery of several large fossils from the Matanza River in Buenos Aires, Argentina. That same year, British paleontologist Sir Richard Owen informally named Glyptodon based on the tooth, but did not provide a species name. In 1839, Owen informally mentioned and illustrated Glyptodon in a chapter of Parish's book Buenos Ayres, and the Provinces of the Rio de La Plata: their present state, trade, and debt.

Owen was working with material from three different localities. This included a mandible (lower jaw) fragment, incomplete left forelimb, a partial right hindlimb, and pieces of the right pes, which were found at Villanueva, the molariform, which was found in Matanza, and portions of a carapace from Las Averías. These fossils were deposited in Parish's collection at the Royal College of Surgeons (RC) upon his return to the United Kingdom earlier in the 1830s. In both Parish's book and his subsequent formal description, Owen erroneously believed the fossils were all from the same specimen. In 1839, Owen formally described the new genus and species Glyptodon clavipes. The generic name Glyptodon derives from Ancient Greek γλυπτός (gluptós) 'sculptured' and ὀδοντ-, ὀδούς (odont-, odoús) 'tooth'. This is in reference to the sculpted anatomy of the molariform. The specific epithet clavipes is derived from the Latin: clava, which can mean "club" or "knotted staff"; and pes, meaning "of or pertaining to a foot". Several remains were cast at the Natural History Museum, London, but the original fossils were lost after German aerial bombing raids hit the college during World War II between 1940 to 1941.

In 1955, French paleontologist Robert Hoffstetter pointed out that the molariform used to name and typify Glyptodon clavipes actually belongs to the glyptodont Panochthus. As a result, Hoffstetter made the Villanueva specimen, which consisted of largely undiagnostic limb bones, the lectotype (name-bearing) specimen. Later studies have pointed out that this specimen is indistinguishable from other Glyptodon species and Glyptotherium. The Las Averias individual consists of a, now missing, carapace that was only mentioned in Owen's description, but was used in later reconstructions of the animal. In 2018, Argentine paleontologist Francisco Cuadrelli and colleagues designated G. clavipes as a species inquirenda because of its chimeric nature and the lack of diagnostic features in the lectotype, noting that analysis of fossils assigned to G, clavipes after 1839 is needed.

=== Other species ===
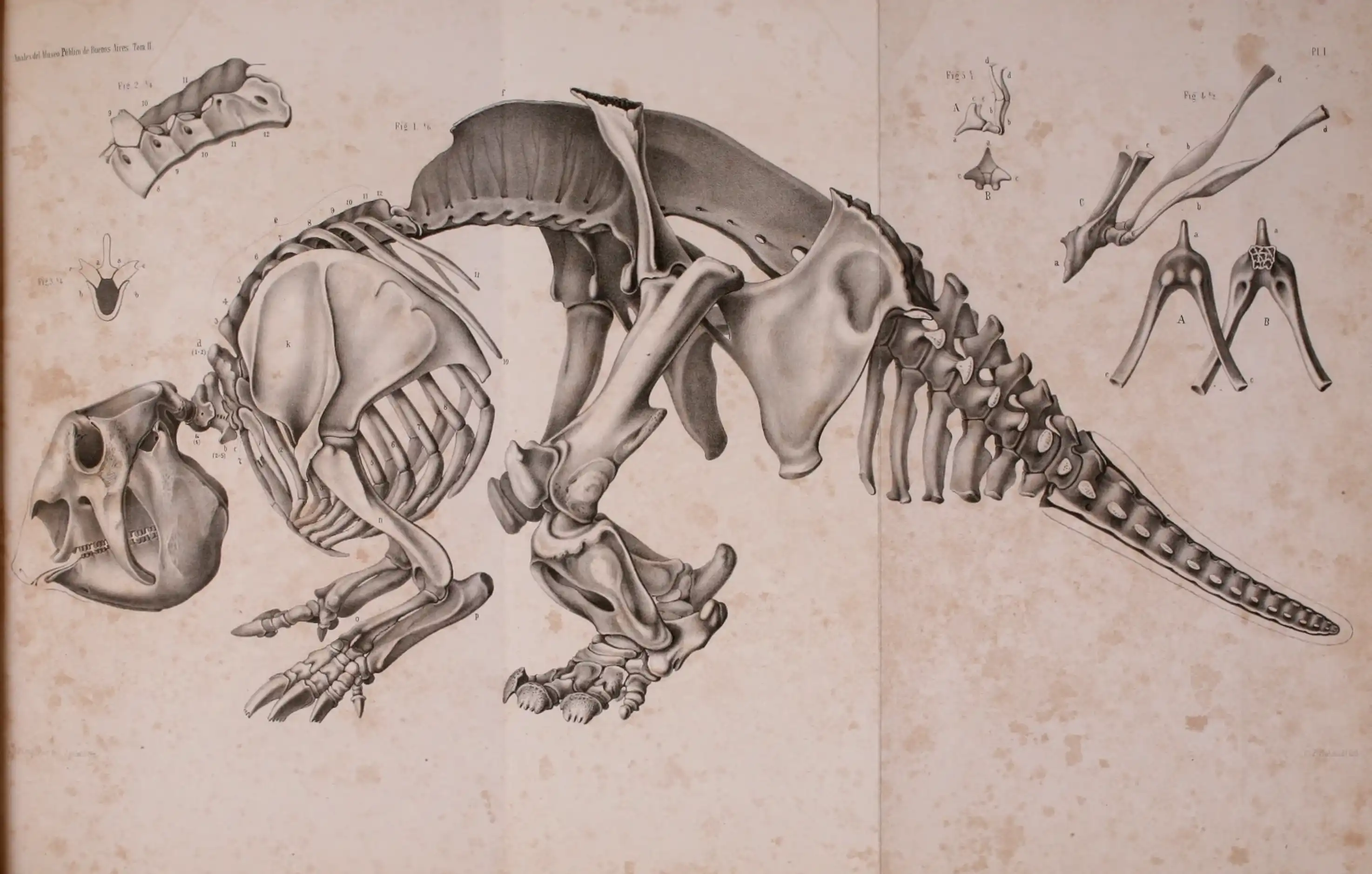
A Glyptodon skeleton, as illustrated by Burmeister, 1874

In 1845, Owen named many other species of Glyptodon. This includes G. ornatus, G. clavicaudatus, G. reticulatus, and G. tuberculatus, of which only G. reticulatus is still considered a valid Glyptodon species. The other three have since been reassigned to other genera. G. reticulatus was named on the basis of several carapace fragments that had also been recovered from the Matanza River, but they lack detailed locality information. The holotype was also destroyed during German bombing raids in World War II. The fragments were cast by the Natural History Museum as well. G. reticulatus is among the most well-understood Glyptodon genera because the holotype is diagnostic and many complete specimens are known. The first significant revision of Glyptodon taxonomy began in 1864, where German paleontologist Hermann Burmeister published a series of papers and a monograph from 1864 to 1879. This included an over 400-page monograph on the glyptodonts as a whole, wherein he thoroughly illustrated and described three Glyptodon species.

Léonard Nodot described a new genus and species of glyptodontine in 1855, Schistopleurum typus, on the basis of a caudal tube found in the Pampas of Argentina, but it has since been synonymized with G. reticulatus. Another species now seen as valid, G. munizi, was described in 1881 by Argentine paleontologist Florentino Ameghino (1853–1911) on the basis of several osteoderms found in the Ensenadan of Arroyo del Medio, San Nicolás, Argentina. For many years the taxon was only known from the fragmentary holotype, but skull and complete carapace material of the species was later described in detail in 2006 that cemented its validity. German zoologist Hermann Burmeister described several Glyptodon fossils in the 1860s and 1870s, many of them he named as new species of Glyptodon itself or the synonym Schistopleurum, all of which are now synonyms of Glyptodon and its species. In 1908, Florentino Ameghino named another species of Glyptodon, G. chapalmalensis, based on a carapace fragment that he had collected from the coast of Buenos Aires Province that dated to the Chapadmalalan. In 1932, A. Castellanos made a new genus for G. chapalmalensis, Paraglyptodon, which later included another species, P. uquiensis, that was based on more complete specimens that had been collected from Uquía, Argentina between 1909 and 1912. P. uquiensis has been synonymized with Glyptodon and is possibly a valid species, though further analysis is necessary to settle its status.

In 1953, the Argentine paleontologist Alfredo Castellanos (1893–1975) erected the generic name Glyptopedius for the species G. elongatus, which had been named by Hermann Burmeister in 1866 on the basis of a single carapace, though its validity is disputed. Castellanos also referred the species G. reticulatus to the genus, but this unsupported. Yet another genus was erected in 1976 named Heteroglyptodon by Francisco Lucas Roselli based on an incomplete skeleton that had been collected from the Pleistocene aged Libertad Formation in Nueva Palmira, Uruguay, but it has since been found to be an indeterminate specimen of Glyptodon. Several Glyptodon fossils from Pleistocene deposits in Colombia were described in 2012, extending the known range of the genus north greatly.

In 2020, Argentine zoologist Francisco Cuadrelli and colleagues named a new species of Glyptodon, G. jatunkhirkhi, on the an associated carapace, caudal rings, and pelvis that were found in a layer of Late Pleistocene-aged sandstones about 4,100–2,500 metres (13,500–8,200 ft) over sealevel near the city of Sucre in Yamparaez, Bolivia. The authors assigned several paratypes to G. jatunkhirkhi including a skull and osteoderms that were discovered in Late Pleistocene sites in the Eastern Cordillera mountain range. In a phylogenetic analysis conducted by Cuadrelli et al., 2020, G. jatunkhirki was recovered as the most basal Glyptodon species. Reassessment of Glyptodon species began in the late 20th and early 21st centuries, with various hypotheses developing on the number of valid species. Numbers varied, with some authors considering at least 4 species valid, while phylogenetic analyses in 2018 and 2020 only found the species G. reticulatus, G. munizi, and G. jatunkhirkhi definitively valid; G. clavipes and G. uquiensis as species inquirendae. However a 2016 review of G. uquiensis determined that G. uquiensis was actually an indeterminate glyptodontine.

=== Glyptotherium ===
Beginning in the 1870s, glyptodont fossils were reported from Pleistocene-age deposits in North America, especially Mexico and the southern United States. From a drainage canal near Tequixquiac, Mexico, a skull, nearly complete carapace, and associated postcranial skeleton were collected by Mexican civil engineers Juan N. Cuatáparo and Santiago Ramírez. In 1875, they named the fossils Glyptodon mexicanum, however this specimen has been lost and G. mexicanum is considered a synonym of Glyptotherium cylindricum. This was the first discovery of glyptodont remains in North America. Several other North American glyptodontine species were named throughout the late 19th-early 20th century, typically based on fragmentary osteoderms. All North American and Central American fossils of glyptodontines have since been referred to the closely related genus Glyptotherium, which was named in 1903 by American paleontologist Henry Fairfield Osborn.

== Taxonomy ==
Glyptodon is the type genus of the group Glyptodonta, the family Glyptodontidae, and the subfamily Glyptodontinae (sometimes called the tribe Glyptodontini). Glyptodon was formerly thought to be an edentate, a now outdated term for mammals that lacked incisors, however it has since been recognized as a cingulate. Owen recognized this, but did not erect a new family for the genus. In 1869, British zoologist John Edward Gray erected the name Glyptodontidae to include Glyptodon, Hoplophorus, and Panochthus and diagnosed them by the presence of a carapace that was fused to the pelvis. In 1874, Hermann Burmeister proposed the name Biloricata for the family, believing that glyptodontines possessed a ventral plastron (bottom shell) and could pull their heads inside their carapaces like turtles. Glyptodonts are defined by their large, bony carapaces, fused lumbar vertebrae, and the presence of eight upper and lower molariforms.

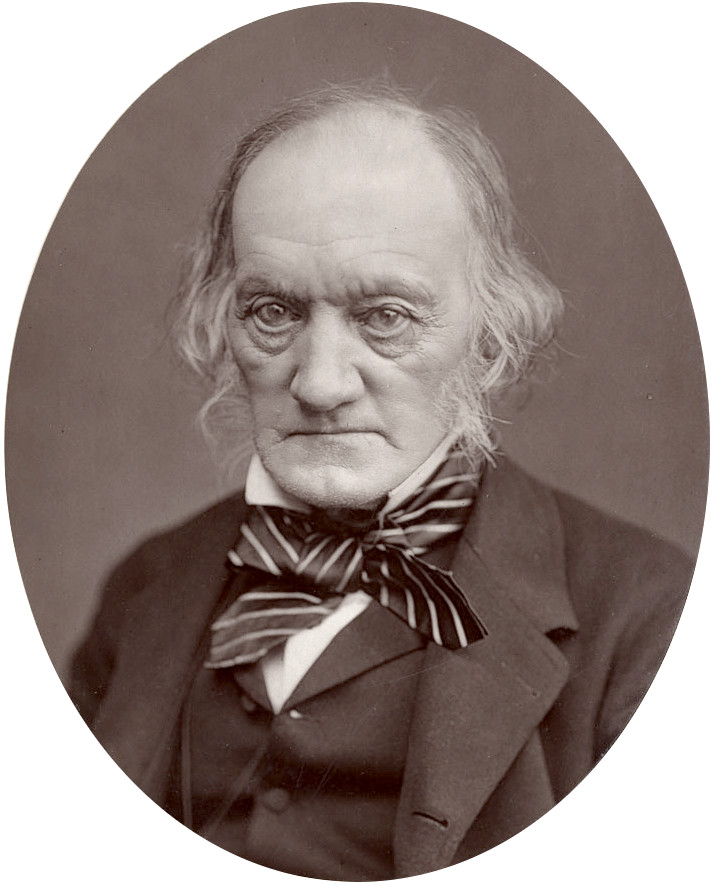
Portrait of Sir Richard Owen (1804–1892), describer of Glyptodon.

Glyptodonts' internal systematics are poorly understood, largely on account of the fragmentary and undiagnostic nature of many of its genera. Glyptodontidae includes several subfamilies, including Glyptodontinae. Glyptodontinae contains three genera; Boreostemma, Glyptotherium, and Glyptodon itself. It likely diverged from the rest of Glyptodontidae in the Middle Miocene (ca. 13 mya), with the earliest known genus being Boreostemma. Glyptodon and Glyptotherium evolved in the Pliocene, starting around 3.9 million years ago. Glyptodontines have the broadest latitudinal distribution of any glyptodont group.

Glyptodon in the south and Glyptotherium in the north, though Glyptotherium also lived in some areas of South America like Venezuela and eastern Brazil. Glyptotherium and Glyptodon lived during the same intervals and are nearly identical to Glyptodon in many aspects, so much so that the first fossils of Glyptotherium to be described were misidentified as those of Glyptodon. Glyptodontini is distinguishable from other groups for example in that it has large, conical tubercular osteoderms absent or only present on the caudal (tailward) notch on the posterior end of the carapace and different ornamentation of the armor on the carapace than the tail. Glyptodontini is often recovered as more basal to most other glyptodontines like Doedicurus, Hoplophorus, and Panochthus.

Below is the phylogenetic analysis conducted by Cuadrelli et al., 2020 of Glyptodontinae, with Glyptodontidae as a family instead of subfamily, that focuses on advanced glyptodonts:

- Chlamyphoridae
  - Euphractus sexcinctus
  - - Pampatherium
    - Glyptodontinae
      - - Glyptodontini
          - - Boreostemma acostae
            - Boreostemma venezolensis
          - - - Glyptotherium cylindricum
              - Glyptotherium texanum
            - - Glyptodon jatunkhirkhi
              - - Glyptodon reticulatus
                - Glyptodon munizi
        - - - Propalaehoplophorus australis
            - - Eucinepeltus petestatus
              - - Cochlops muricatus
                - - Plohophorus figuratus
                  - Pseudoplohophorus absolutus
                  - - Doedicurini
                      - Eleutherocercus antiquus
                      - Doedicurus clavicaudatus
                    - - Neosclerocalyptini
                        - Neosclerocalyptus ornatus
                        - Neosclerocalyptus paskoensis
                      - Hoplophorini
                        - Hoplophorus euphractus
                        - - Panochthus intermedius
                          - Panochthus tuberculatus

== Description ==
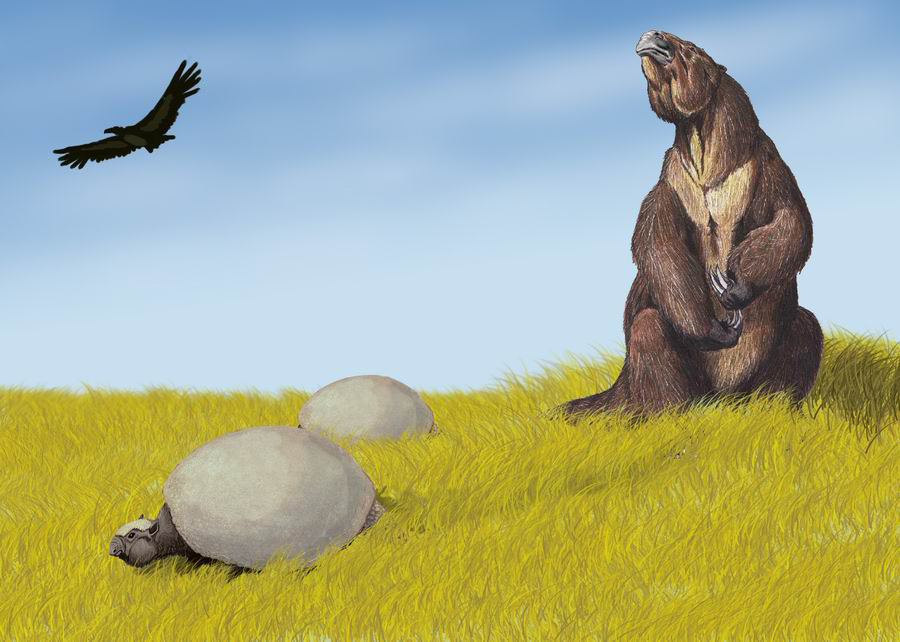
Life restoration of Glyptodon with Megatherium

Like the extant armadillos and all other glyptodontines, Glyptodon had a large, bony carapace that covered much of its torso, as well as smaller cephalic armor covering the roof of its head, akin to that in turtles. The carapace was composed of hundreds of small, hexagonal osteoderms (armored structures made of bone), with Glyptodon carapaces preserving a total of 1,800 osteoderms each. The anatomy of different Glyptodon species varies greatly, mostly in the species G. jatunkhirkhi which is more similar to Glyptotherium in certain aspects.

In the axial skeleton, glyptodontines had strongly fused vertebrae and pelves completely connected to the carapace, traits convergently evolved in turtles. The large tails of glyptodontines likely served as a counterbalance to the rest of the body and Glyptodon's caudal armor ended in a blunt tube that was composed of two concentric tubes fused together, in contrast to those of mace-tailed glyptodontines like Neosclerocalyptus and Doedicurus. Glyptodon had graviportal (weight-bearing), short limbs that are very similar to those in other glyptodontines, being indistinguishable from those of some other taxa. The digits of Glyptotherium are very stout and adapted for weight-bearing, though some preserve large claw sheaths that had an intermediate morphology between claws and hooves.

During the Pleistocene, the diversity of glyptodontines diminished but body size increased, with the largest known glyptodont, Doedicurus, evolving in the Pleistocene. Glyptodon sizes vary between species and individuals. G. clavipes, the type species, was estimated to weigh 2,000 kilograms (4,400 lb), G. reticulatus weighed a mere 401 kilograms (884 lb) to 862 kilograms (1,900 lb), and G. munizi weighed 1,150 kilograms (2,540 lb). A partial skeleton of G. clavipes measured 3.5 metres (11 ft) with a carapace length of 1.7 metres (5.6 ft), while the carapaces of other species like G. munizi and G. reticulatus measured 2.2 metres (7.2 ft) and 2.19 metres (7.2 ft) long respectively.

=== Skull ===
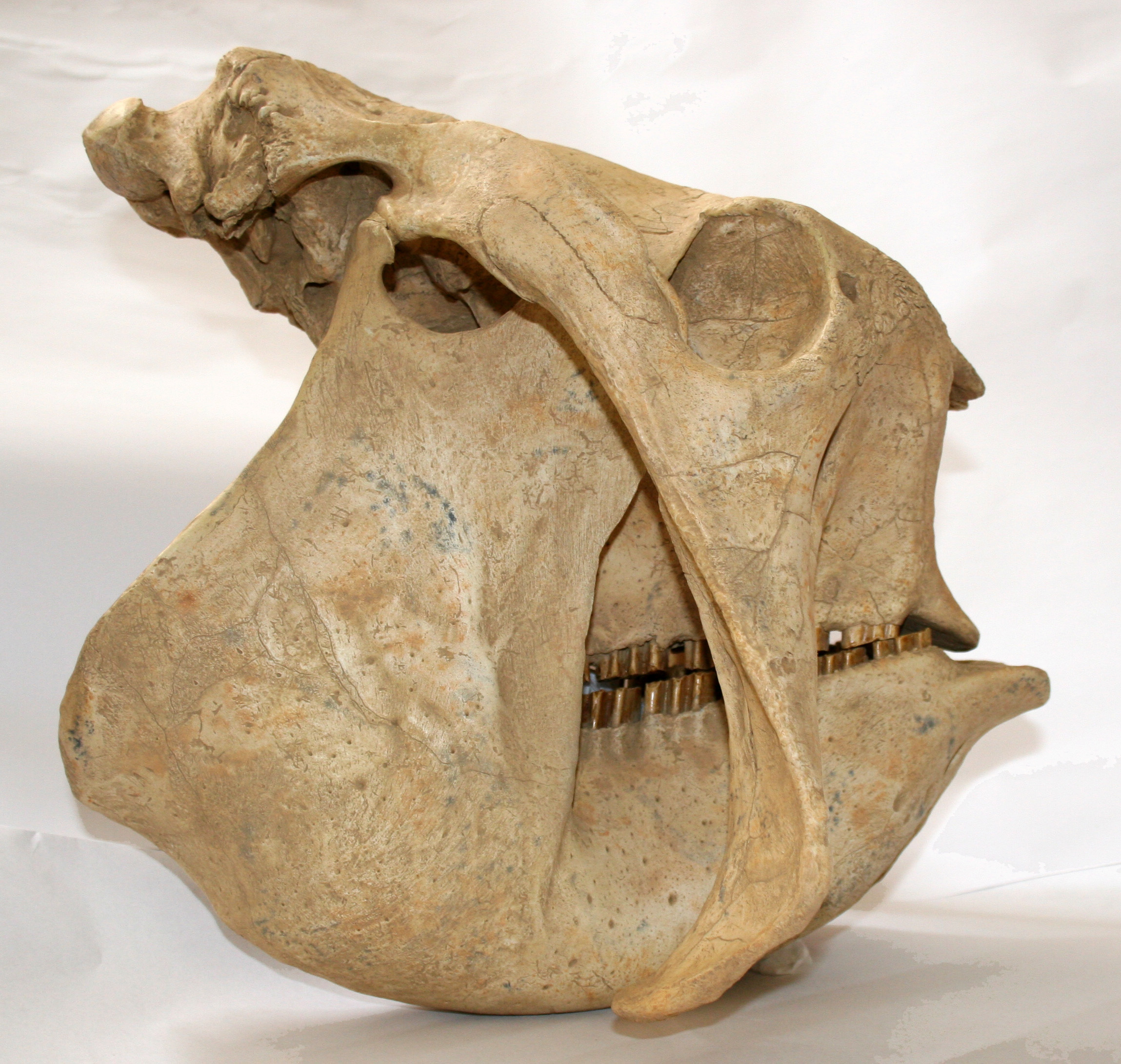
Skull of Glyptodon in side view.

Glyptodont dentition contains entirely hypsodont molariforms, which have one of the most extreme examples of hypsodonty known from terrestrial mammals. The dentition is typical of other armadillos, but is fluted on each side by deep grooves. The anterior teeth were compressed, while the posterior teeth were cylindrical. Glyptodont skulls have several unique features; the maxilla and palatine are enlarged vertically to make space for the molariforms, while the braincase is brachycephalic, short and flat. In Glyptodon and many other glyptodontines, the roof of the skull was covered by a shield composed of polygonal, irregular osteoderms that were variable in size and ankylosed together to form a robust cephalic shield that had a smoothly convex exterior surface without ornamentation. Each osteoderm has a rugose and slightly convex dorsal surface, with ornamentation pattern defined by a central figure, slightly elevated and surrounded by an area without peripheral figures or foramina. Sutures separating osteoderms are well marked, as in Panochthus. Other Pleistocene glyptodontines are known by complete/sub-complete skulls, allowing for comparisons to Glyptodon. Glyptotherium's zygoma are narrow, slender, almost parallel, and close to the sagittal plane in frontal view; in Glyptodon, this structure is broader, robust, divergent rather than parallel and more laterally placed.

The nasal passage was reduced with heavy muscle attachments for some unknown purpose. Some have speculated that the muscle attachments were for a proboscis, or trunk, much like that of a tapir or elephant. The lower jaws were very deep and helped support massive chewing muscles to help chew coarse fibrous plants. Some paleontologists have proposed that Glyptodon and some glyptodontines also had a proboscis or large snout similar to those in proboscideans and tapirs, but few have accepted this hypothesis. Another suggestion, made by A.E. Zurita and colleagues, is that the large nasal sinuses could be correlated with the cold arid climate of Pleistocene South America. A distinctive bar of bone projects downwards on the cheek, extending over the lower jaw, perhaps providing an anchor for powerful snout muscles. In turn, the infraorbital foramina are narrow and not visible in anterior view in Glyptotherium, but in Glyptodon they are broad and clearly visible in anterior view. In lateral view, the dorso-ventral height between the skull roof and the palatal plane in Glyptodon decreases anteriorly, contrary to Glyptotherium; the nasal tip is in a lower plane with respect to the zygomatic arch in Glyptodon, but in Glyptotherium is higher than the zygomatic arch plane. The 1st molariform (molaiform is abbreviated as mf#) of Glyptodon is distinctly trilobate (three-lobed) both lingually and labially, nearly as trilobate as the mf2; on the contrary, Glyptotherium shows a very low trilobation of mf1, which is elliptical in cross-section, the mf2 is weakly trilobate, and the mf3 is trilobate. In both genera, the mf4 to mf8 are fully trilobate and serially identical. These traits separate the two genera. Within the genus Glyptodon this trait varies as well, with G. reticulatus having triloby to a greater degree than G. munizi.

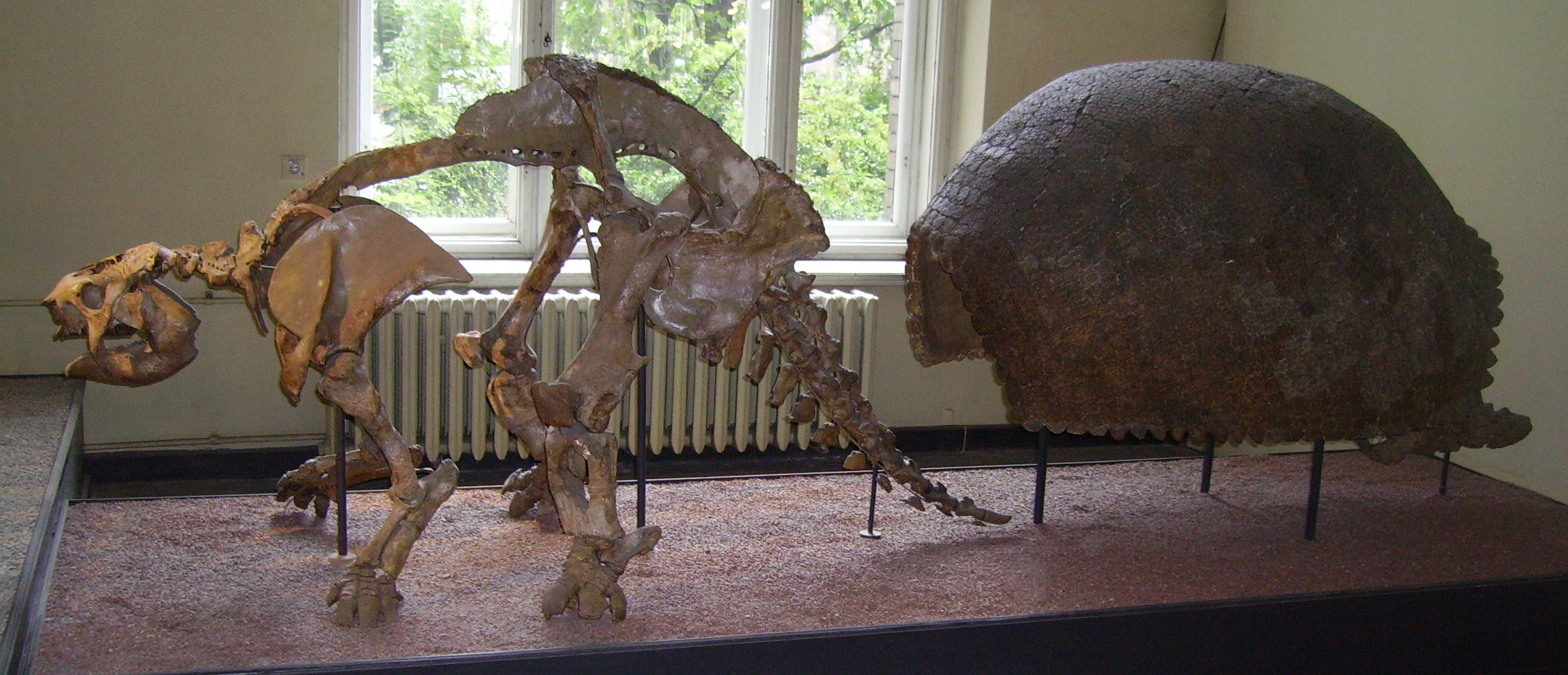
Glyptodon skeleton and shell in Museum für Naturkunde, Berlin

The mandibles of Glyptotherium and Glyptodon are very similar, but Glyptotherium's mandible is smaller by about 10% in total size. The angle between the occlusal plane (part of the jaw where upper and lower teeth contact) and the anterior margin of the ascending ramus is approximately 60° in Glyptotherium, while it is 65° in Glyptodon. The ventral margin of the horizontal ramus is more concave in Glyptodon than in Glyptotherium. The symphysis area is extended greatly in Glyptotherium antero-posteriorily compared to Glyptodon. The mf1 is ellipsoidal in Glyptotherium and the mf2 is "submolariform", while in Glyptodon both teeth are trilobate.

=== Vertebrae and pelvis ===
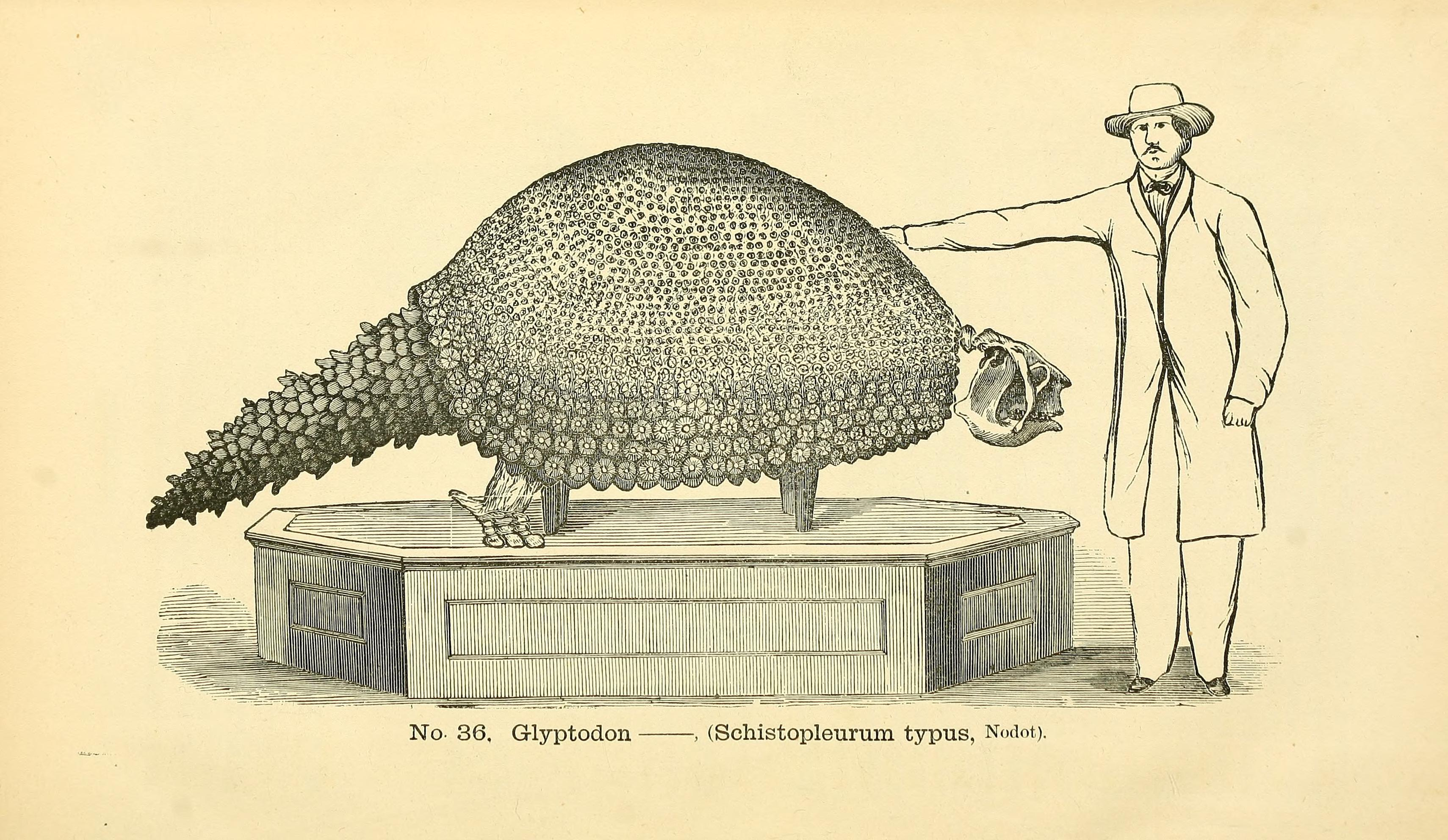
A mounted skeleton of G. reticulatus (Schistopleurum asperus)

Glyptodon has 7 cervical vertebrae, of which the first 3 cervicals were fused together while the rest of the cervicals were free except for the 7th. The 7th cervical and the first 2 dorsal vertebrae were fused together into a trivertebral, a broad, flat bone with very small spinous processes (projections from a vertebra) and large articular surfaces that held ribs. All of the other 13 vertebrae in the dorsal column were fused into one long continuous tunnel that is not seen in mammals outside of glyptodontines, some of these vertebrae were so tightly fused that the segments of them cannot be discerned. The centra of these vertebrae were curved, thin bony plates that created a cylinder to support the carapace and the shape of the animal. Spinous processes in these vertebrae are also heavily reduced, with some being only a thin blade of bone ankylosed with other vertebrae. Sacral vertebrae in Glyptodon are also fused and 13 in number, which preserve very unusual oval-shaped, thin, and slightly concave ends on the centra. The pelves are also unusual, as they preserve giant ilia and are fused to the rest of the skeleton.

=== Carapace and osteoderms ===
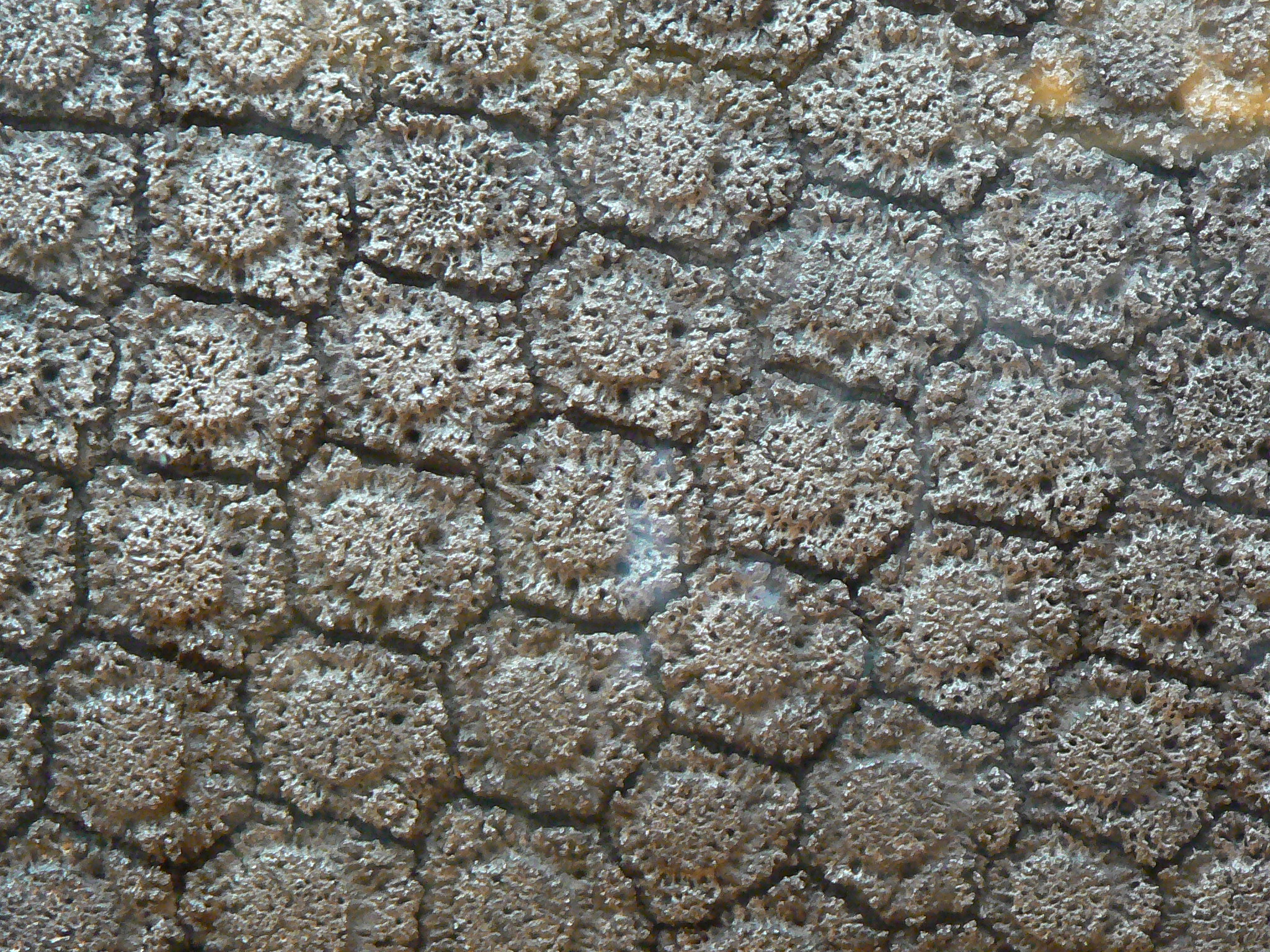
Close-up view of carapace

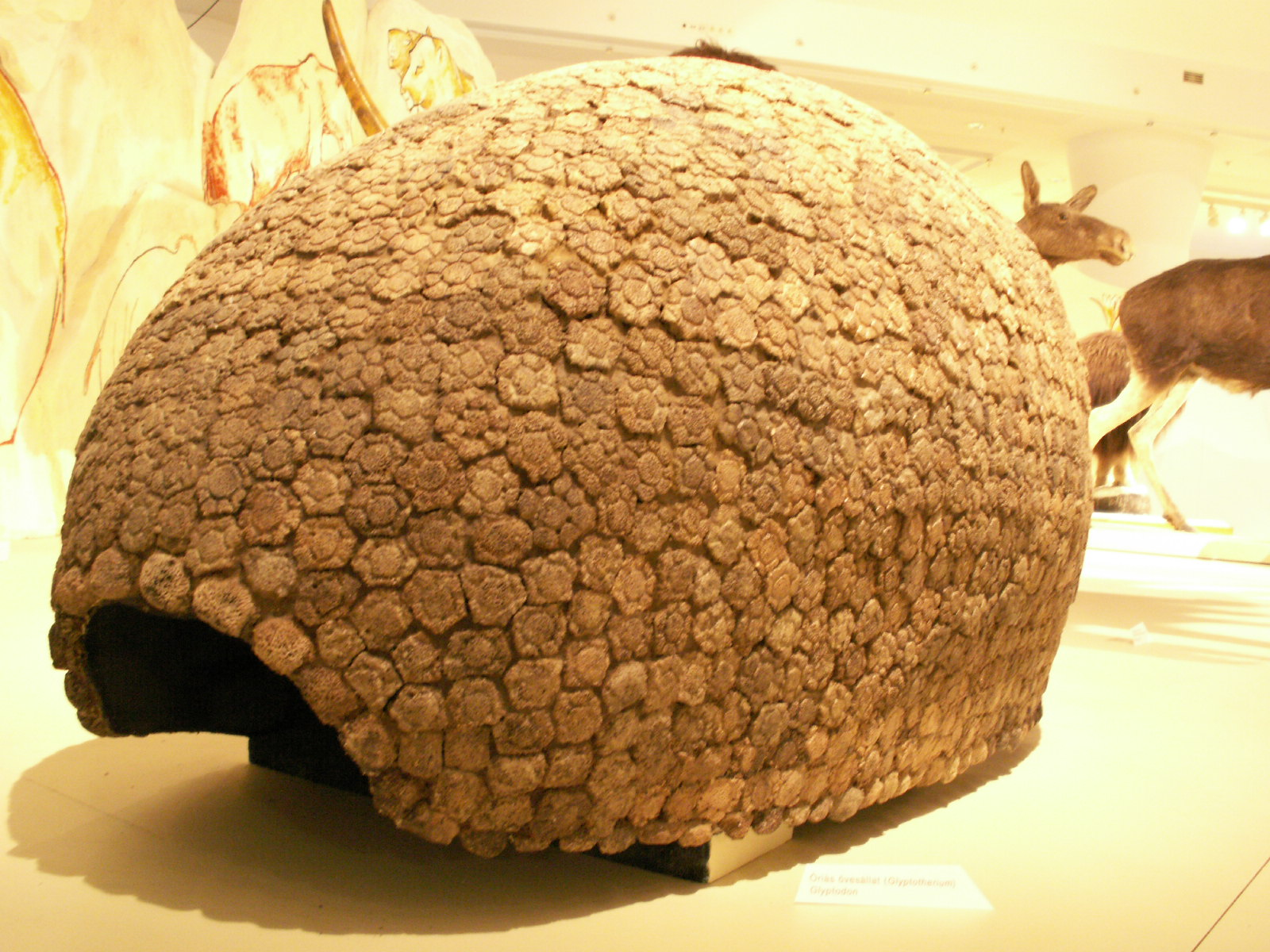
Glyptodon carapace in Hungarian Natural History Museum

Glyptodon's osteoderms were attached by synotoses (bony connections) and were found in double or triple rows on the front and sides of the carapace's edges, as well as in the tail armor and cephalic shield. The carapace's osteoderms were conical with a rounded point, while the ones on the tail were just conical. The sulci between these raised structures were deep and wide with parallel lines. The carapace of Glyptodon was strongly elongated compared to those of Boreostemma and Glyptotherium, with the carapace being relatively 65% longer than the former and 14% than the latter. In Glyptodon, the top-bottom height of the carapace represents 60% of its total length, whereas in Glyptotherium it is taller at circa 70%. The antero-posterior dorsal profile of the carapace was convex and its posterior half was higher than the anterior. The apex of the carapace was slightly displaced posteriorly in most Glyptodon species, while in Glyptotherium and Glyptodon jatunkhirkhi it was at the center of the midline. The carapace of most species of Glyptodon is arched subtly, while Glyptotherium and Glyptodon jatunkhirkhi's has a very arched back and convex pre-iliac and concave post-iliac, giving it a saddle-like overhang over the tail. Glyptodon osteoderms in the antero-lateral regions of the carapace are strongly ankylosed, giving them little flexibility, while in Glyptotherium they are less ankylosed and more flexible.

The osteoderms of the caudal aperture (large conical osteoderms that protect the base of the tail) are more conical in Glyptodon and more rounded in Glyptotherium, though in the latter the anatomy of the caudal aperture osteoderms varies by sex while in Glyptodon it varies by age. The caudal aperture is more vertically oriented in the latter genus, while in Glyptotheirum it is angled posteriorily. Although frequently used to differentiate the two taxa, Glyptodon and Glyptotherium have similar osteoderm morphologies that differ only in several areas. Both genera have tall, thick osteoderms compared to those of many other glyptodontines such as Hoplophorus and Neosclerocalyptus. Glyptodon sometimes preserves a "rosette" pattern, where the osteoderm's central figure is surrounded by a row of peripheral figures, while other specimens lack them completely. G. reticulatus varies from a complete rosette pattern to a reticular surface, which has convex central and peripheral figures. Glyptotherium however always preserves rosettes. The central and radial sulci are deeper and broader in Glyptodon (ca 4–6 millimetres (0.16–0.24 in)) than in Glyptotherium (ca. 1–2.4 millimetres (0.039–0.094 in)). The osteoderms in Glyptodon and Glyptotherium have 5-11 peripheral figures, rugose exposed surfaces, and heights up to 47 millimetres (1.9 in).

Osteoderms on the ventral side of the body were first mentioned by paleontologist Hermann Burmeister in 1866, postulating that there was a ventral plastron like in turtles based on evidence of small armor in the dermis. This hypothesis has since been disproven, but in the early 2000s, the presence of osteoderms on Glyptodon's face, hind legs, and underside was confirmed in several species. The fossils with these characteristics were from the Pleistocene, evolving in younger species like G. reticulatus. These small to medium-sized ossicles were actually embedded in the dermis and did not connect in a pattern.

=== Tail ===
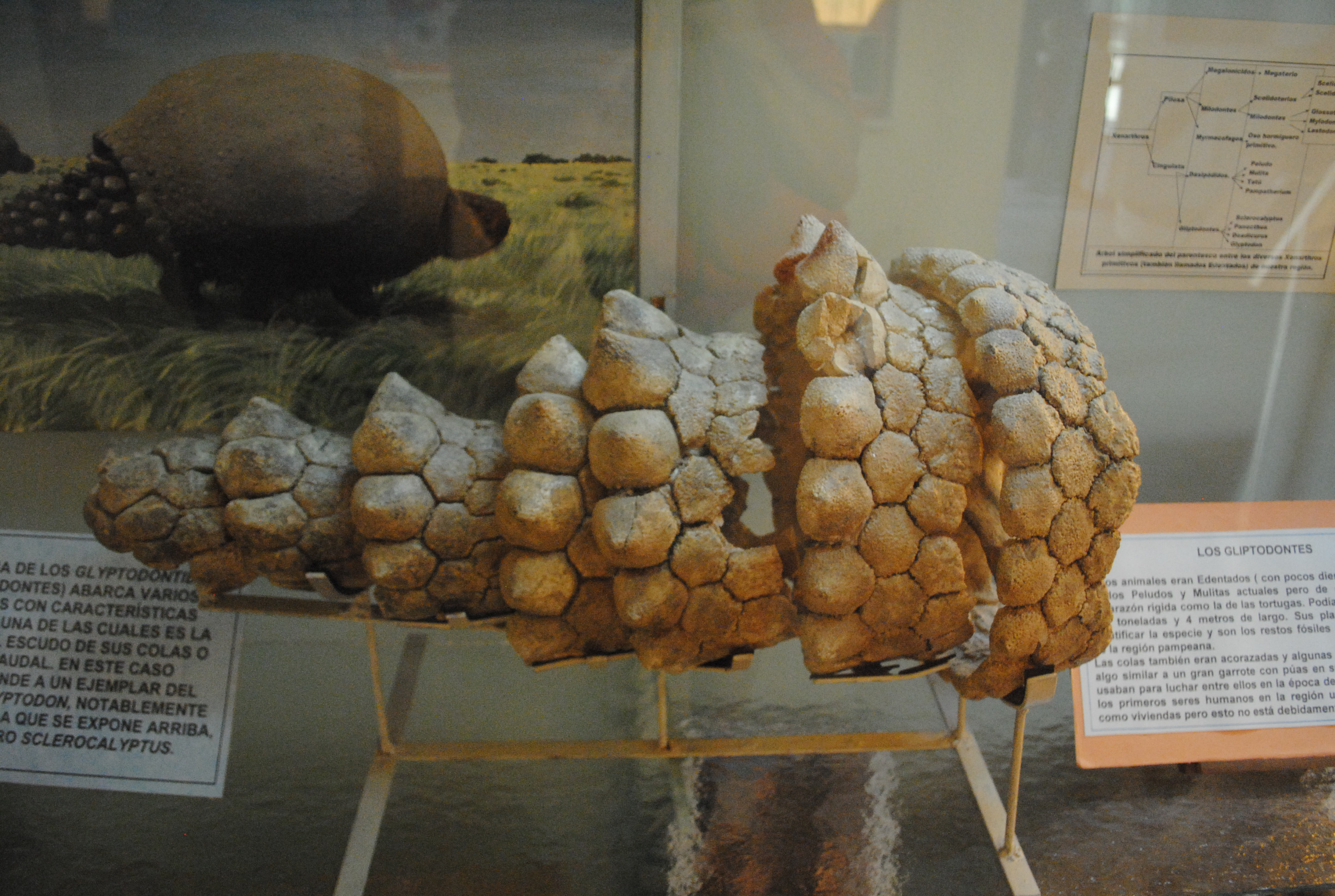
Armor at end of tail

Glyptodon had very primitive tail anatomy for a glyptodont, possessing eight or nine mobile caudal rings of fused, large, conical osteoderms. These enclosed the base of the tail, which terminated in a short caudal tube composed of two fused caudal rings. Caudal rings were composed of two or three rows of pentagonal osteoderms that transitioned from flat, slightly convex in the posterior rings to conical tubercles by the third caudal ring. The more posterior the rings were, the larger they were, with the exception of the 2nd ring which was the largest and 1st complete ring in the series, creating a cone-shaped tail. The distal scutes are larger, and their free margins are rounded producing a fan-like shape. Most of the osteoderms of the distal row (some individuals preserving up to 12) bear prominent conical outlines, in stark contrast to more advanced glyptodontines like Doedicurus and Panochthus, which had completely fused tails that formed an inflexible mace or club. The caudal tube at the distalmost end of the tail is cylinder-shaped with smaller conical osteoderms and is stubbier proportionally in Glyptodon. In Glyptotherium, this caudal tube represents ca. 20% of the total length of the caudal armor, whereas in Glyptodon, this structure represents 13% of the total length. In Glyptodon, the caudal armor length represents circa 30-40% of the carapace's total length in contrast to Glyptotherium, where this value is greater at around 50%. For example, in specimen MCA 2015 of Glyptodon reticulatus, the terminal tube measured only 73.23 millimetres (2.883 in) long in comparison to Glyptotherium texanum specimen UMMP 34 826's 210 millimetres (8.3 in) long tube.

== Paleobiology ==
=== Digging abilities ===
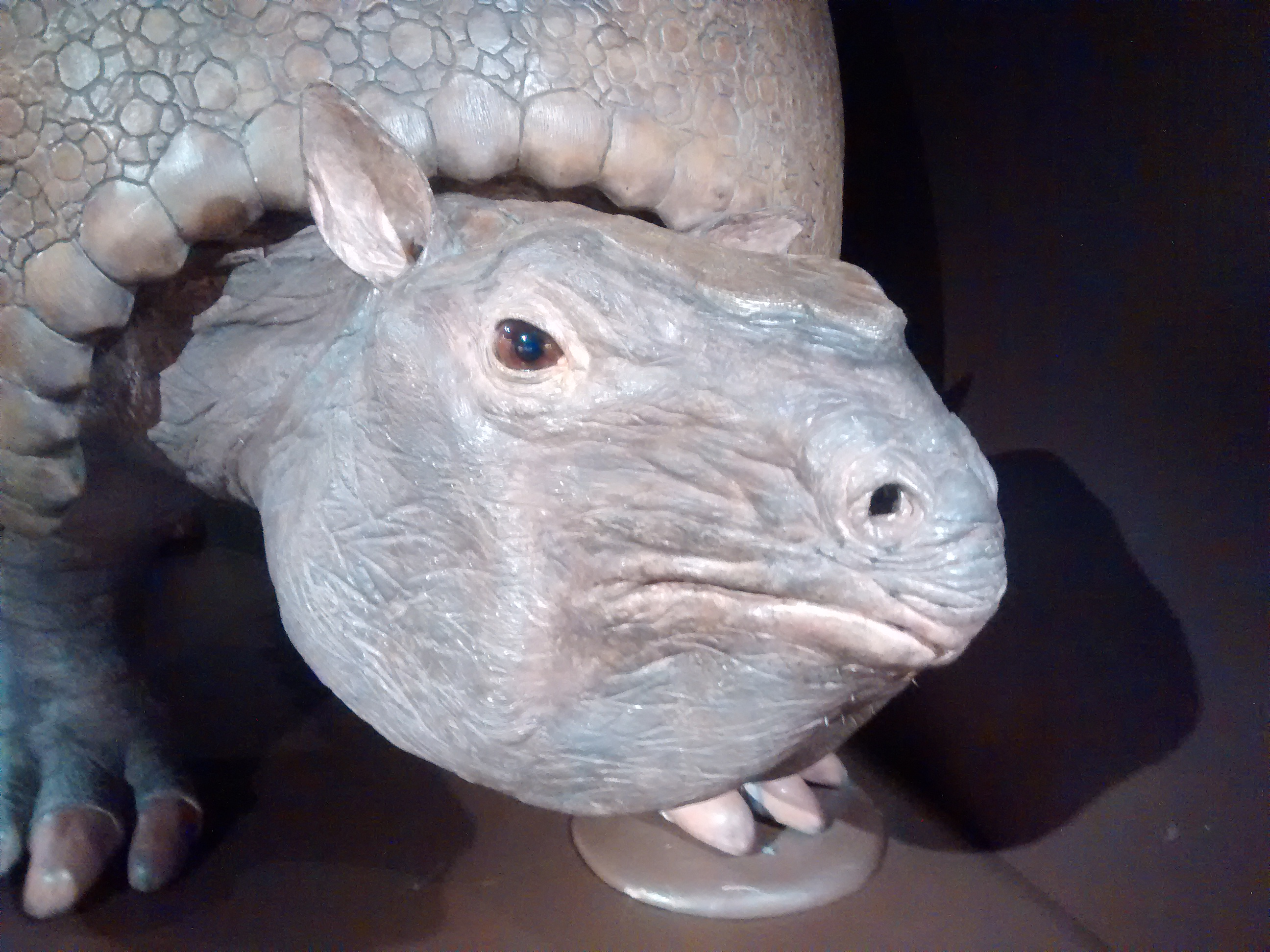
Glyptodon head restoration, Munich

Many armadillo species have digging capabilities, with large claws adapted for scraping dirt in order to make burrows or forage for food underground. Much of armadillo diets consist of insects and other invertebrates that live underground, in contrast to the herbivorous diets of Glyptodon and related genera. Being a large armadillo, Glyptodon's fossorial capabilities have been researched on several occasions. Owen (1841) opposed this idea, though pushback came from Nodot (1856) and Sénéchal (1865) who believed digging was possible for the genus. However, the evolution of a rigid carapace as opposed to a flexible one in extant armadillos as well as a weakly developed deltoid crest on the humerus (upper arm bone) provided evidence against fossorial hypotheses. The elbow had a great range of movement, as with digging cingulates, but this is more likely to be due to size adaptations.

=== Endocranial anatomy ===
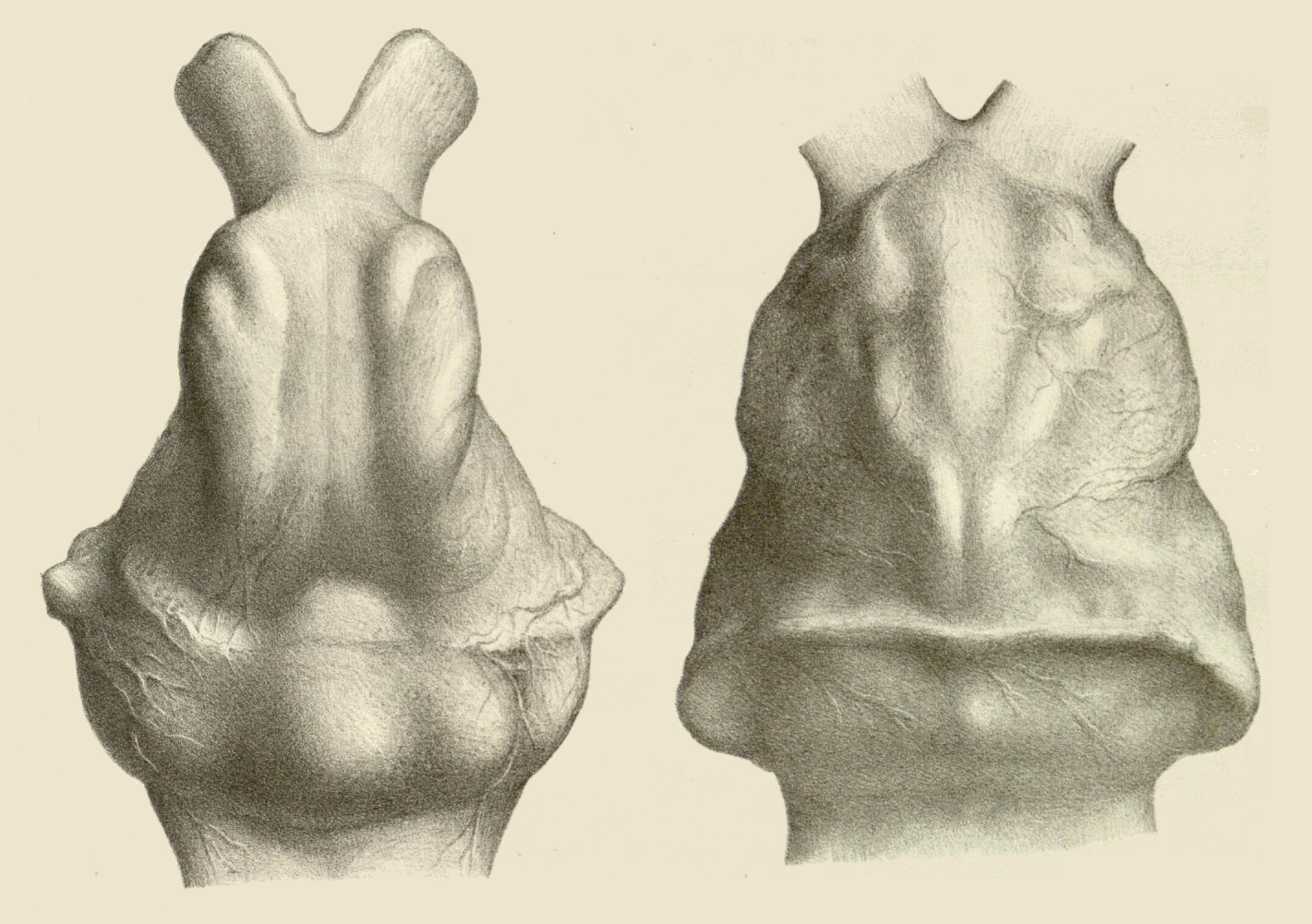
Endocasts of Glyptodon (left) and Doedicurus (right).

Several complete skulls of Glyptodon enable the endocranial anatomy to be analyzed, as well as compared to other well-preserved taxa like Doedicurus and Panochthus. The brain cavities of the larger glyptodontines Glyptodon, Doedicurus, and Panochthus had a braincase volume of 213 to 234 cubic centimeters (7.2 to 7.9 U.S. fl oz). The encephalization quotient of these taxa are 0.12 to 0.4, lower than most modern armadillos (0.44-1.06) and corresponds to those of pampatheres. The brain of the glyptodontines had an extensive olfactory bulb that took up between 4.8 and 9.7% of the entire brain, while around two thirds of it were occupied by the cerebrum and the rest by the cerebellum. Overall, this is akin to that of other armadillos, but in the latter the cerebrum is smaller relative to the cerebellum and the braincase's total volume. Deviating from the armadillos with their wide olfactory bulb, glyptodontines and pampatheres have elongated and triangular olfactory systems. Several other neuroanatomical characteristics differ between glyptodontines and armadillos, such as the presence of a pronounced sulcus praesylvianus.

In general, living cingulates have smaller brains than anteaters and sloths for reasons unknown. Several theories have been made as to why, such as a shorter rearing phase of offspring, dedication of resources to the development of the carapace, and other biological and functional handicaps. Members of Cingulata also tend to have extremely low metabolisms, causing less energy flow to the development of the brain's neurons. The pattern of large bodies bearing adequate protection and a reduction of intelligence is found in several other groups such as ankylosaurs and stegosaurs, two types of armored dinosaur. However, the carapace itself is considered as a restrictive functional component as it prohibited much neck movement and forced a reduced brain size. This reduction thus resulted in weight loss in the skull, which had a great effect on the skulls of large-headed glyptodontines like Glyptodon.

=== Feeding and diet ===
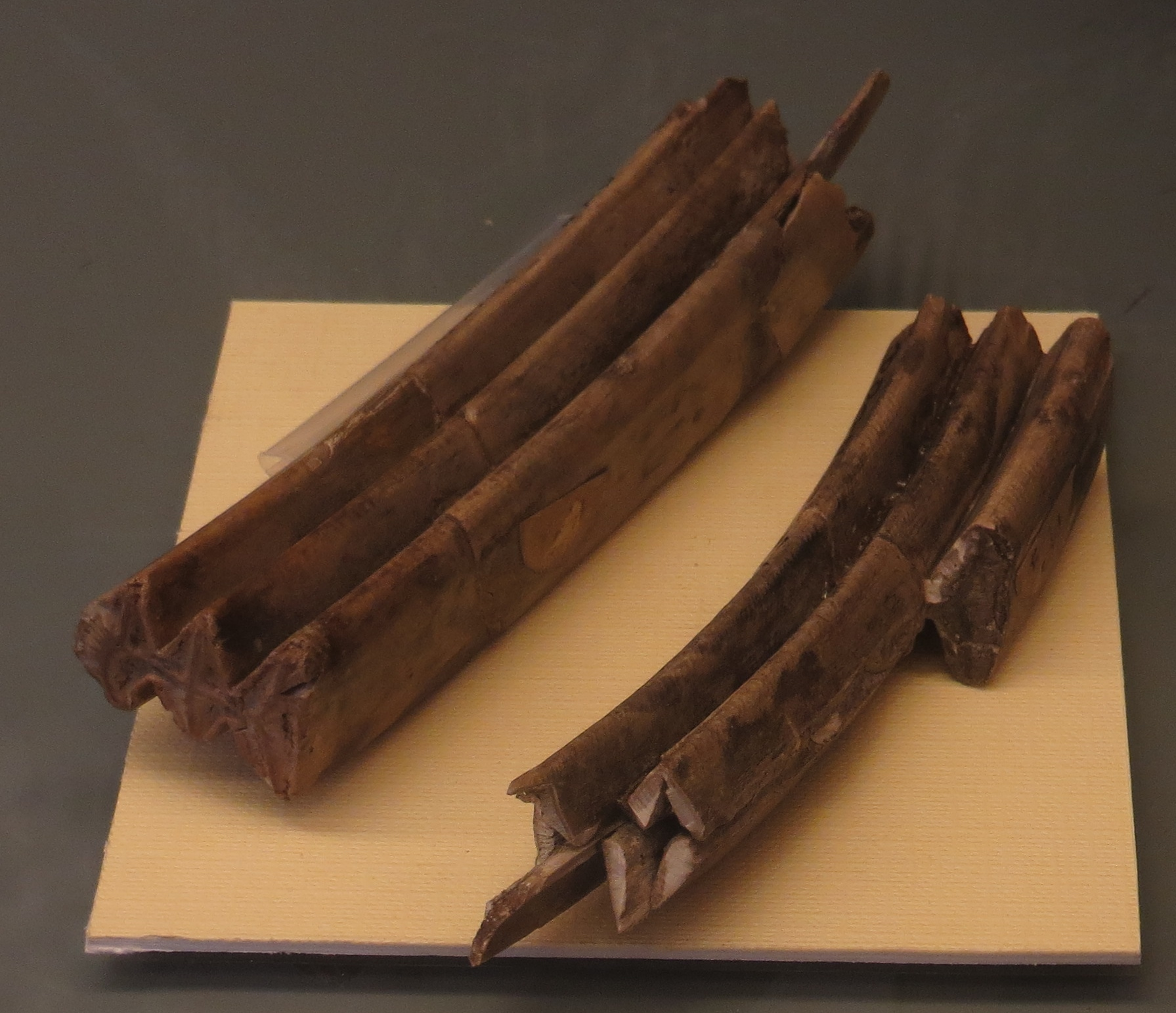
Teeth, with the distinct hypdodonty of glyptodontines.

Two main groups of glyptodontines can be distinguished by their feeding habits: narrow-muzzled Miocene propalaehoplophorids and wide-muzzled post-Miocene glyptodontines. The propalaehoplophorids were selective feeders, while the post-Miocene glyptodontines were bulk feeders (obtain nutrients by consuming an entire plant). However, because of their body form and fusion of the cervical vertebrae glyptodontines would have needed to forage near the ground. Their craniomandibular joint limited their jaw to side-to-side movement. Glyptodon's jaws had large ridges of osteodentine which could effectively be used to grind food particles before shearing and pushing them via the constant motion of the mandible. They had a well-developed snout musculature, along with a mobile neck region that helped them secure food. The hyoid shows a robust design that suggests Glyptodon had a large and robust tongue, which may have aided in food intake and processing.

Like most other xenarthrans, glyptodontines had lower energy requirements than contemporary mammal groups. The stomachs of glyptodontids are mysterious due to being entirely herbivorous, in contrast to modern, omnivorous armadillos which have simple stomachs instead of the chambered ones of sloths. This in conjugation with the proposed idea that aquatic grazing may have caused the isotopes strongly associated with herbivory observed in Glyptodon fossils. However, aquatic grazing in Glyptodon is little supported though more backing for this hypothesis has been found in the related Glyptotherium. A carbon isotopic analysis of Glyptodon bones by França et al (2015) found that it consumed a variety of both C3 plants and C4 grasses at lower latitudes while it ate exclusively C3 grasses at higher ones, implying an ecological shift based on the climate. A 2012 analysis of isotopes supports this, but the isotopic results are not backed by morphological evidence. The isotopic conclusion would place Glyptodon as a mixed browser in most environments, similar to some other glyptodontines. The 2012 paper also noted that Glyptodon may have had a more flexible diet than previously imagined, with a mix of slightly wooded and slightly open habitats as implied by the consumption of C3 and C4 material. The C4 plants include groups like Poaceae, Cyperaceae, Asteraceae, and Amaranthaceae based on palynological evidence, meaning that Glyptodon likely ate C4 flowering plants in addition to C3 grasses. A mesowear analysis supported their conclusion, however, finding that mixed-feeding causing blunt wear that suggests a more abrasion-dominated diet. This is similar to that of Neosclerocalyptus, but in contrast to Hoplophorus which had sharper wear ends. Neosclerocalyptus favored more open environments despite this, as found by isotopic studies. The mesowear angles of Glyptodon were noted to possess a bimodal distribution, implying a difference between populations, sexes, or species in diet.

=== Intraspecific combat ===
Glyptodonts are believed to have taken part in intraspecific fighting. It was presumed that since the tail of Glyptodon was very flexible and had rings of bony plates, it was used as a weapon in fights. Although its tail could be used for defense against predators, evidence suggests that the tail of Glyptodon was primarily for attacks on its own kind. A G. reticulatus fossil displays damage done on the surface of its carapace. A study based on this specimen calculated that Glyptodon tails would have been able to generate enough force to break the carapace of another Glyptodon. This suggests that they likely fought each other to settle territorial or mating disputes through the use of their tails, much like male-to-male fighting among deer using their antlers.

=== Ontogeny ===
In 2009, a partial skeleton of a prenatal individual of Glyptodon was described that had been found inside of the pelvic region of a carapace of an adult. The skeleton had been collected from the Pleistocene-aged deposits in the Tarija Valley of Bolivia and included a partial skull, partial mandible, and fragments from the scapulae and femora. The skeleton is the only known prenatal specimen of a glyptodontine and is one of the most complete specimens of an immature Glyptodon known, though dozens of isolated osteoderms from juveniles are known. The preserved skull measures only 51 mm long, but still bears many characteristics of Glyptodon such as a subtriangular naris, a lateral margin on the naris that forms an acute angle of 30-degrees, oval infraorbital foramina, and several other traits. However, the mandible differs in that the ascending ramus is at a 90-degree angle in contrast to the 60-70 degree angles preserved in adults. Interestingly, this mandibular morphology is alike to that in some specimens of Glyptotherium cylindricum.

In the osteoderms of juvenile Glyptodon reticulatus, the central figures are larger than the peripheral osteoderms. These central figures are planar, sometimes even concave, and elevated compared to the peripherals. The peripherals in younger individuals are also less distinct and bear weakly marked or absent furrows (grooves that separate osteoderms). On the other hand, peripherals and central figures of adults are similarly sized, distinct, and of similar heights.

=== Posture ===
Several interpretations of glyptodontine posture have been made, starting with those by Richard Owen in 1841 using comparative anatomy. Owen theorized that the phalanges were weight-bearing due to their short and broad physiology, in addition to evidence provided in the postcranial skeleton. It was also proposed that an upright posture was possible for Glyptodon, first by Sénéchal (1865) who stated that the tail could be an equilibrium for the front half of the body as well as a method of supporting the legs. Linear measurements were later taken which provided insight into this hypothesis, finding that bipedalism would be possible. The patellar articulation with the femur suggests rotation of the lower leg during knee extension and potentially even knee-locking were feasible.

=== Trackways ===
The first ever glyptodont footprints were recovered from the late Pleistocene Pehuén-Có fossil site, Argentina, and referred to Glyptodon. In 2015, these tracks were described as the ichnotaxon Glyptodontichnus pehuencoensis. The rarity of glyptodont trackways despite their frequency in the fossil record suggests that glyptodonts may have avoided walking on muddy substrates because they were vulnerable to getting trapped.

=== Sexual dimorphism and group behavior ===
No evidence of sexual dimorphism in Glyptodon has been described, but it has been observed in the close relative Glyptotherium based on fossils found in Pliocene deposits in Arizona. In the genus, the caudal aperture of males and females differ in that the marginal osteoderms of males are much more conical and convex than those of females. Even in the carapaces of newborn Glyptotherium, the marginal osteoderms are either conical or flat, which enables their sex to be determined. No direct evidence of glyptodontine group behavior has been described, though some localities preserving juveniles, subadults, and adults of Glyptotherium together are known. Living armadillos are loners and only come together during mating season, with the number of offspring varying between one and even twelve babies depending on the species.

== Distribution and paleoecology ==
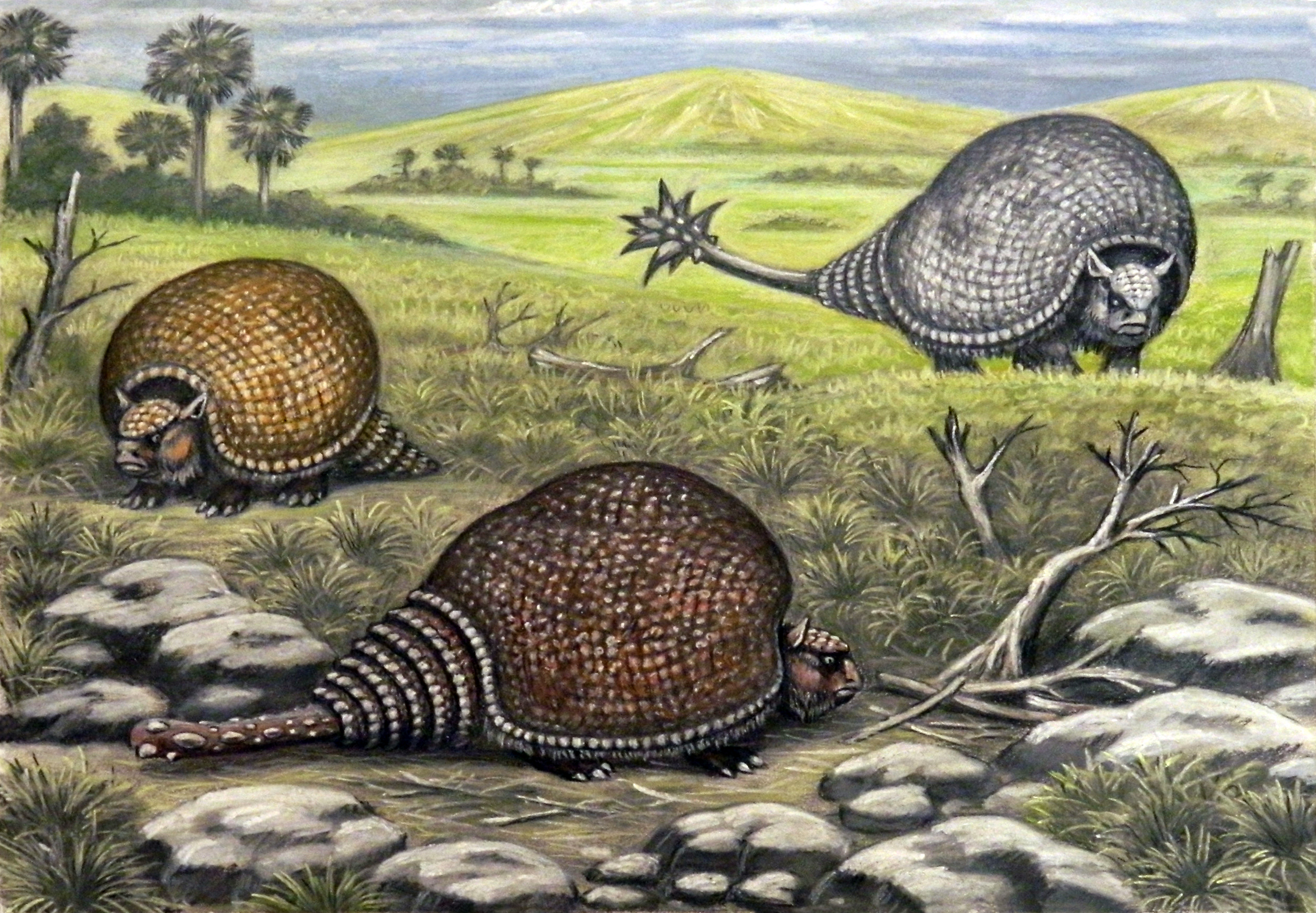
The contemporary glyptodonts Glyptodon, Doedicurus, and Panochthus

Glyptodon is one of the most common Pleistocene glyptodontines with a large range from the lowland Pampas to the towering Andean Mountains of Peru and Bolivia, some fossils found at elevations reaching over 4,100 metres (13,500 ft) above sea level. Only G. munizi is found in the early-middle Pleistocene, whereas other species are younger. G. munizi survived until about 150 ka. G. reticulatus is specifically noted to be known from 60ka to as recent as 7ka possibly, though confirmed records only extend to 11 ka. The genus had a generalist diet, which allowed it to fill niches in areas that were inaccessible by grazing genera, with G. reticulatus representing up to 90% of the glyptodontine fossils in the Tarija Valley of Bolivia. However, in regions such as the Pampas, Mesopotamia, and Uruguay, an array of glyptodontines are known. Further evidence of Glyptodon's adaptability is found in the Pampas, which were semihumid and temperate from 30,000 to 11,000 ka, alternating between the rainy and dry seasons, over a large area consisting mostly of grasslands dotted with forests and mixed shrubbery. Temperatures in this region were lower than the present, with an estimated mean annual temperature 4.2 °C (39.6 °F) in the Pampas compared to 16.4 °C (61.5 °F) in Buenos Aires today. The Pampas specifically was a mix of semi-arid Patagonian and tropical Brazilian climates during the middle Pleistocene before the expansion of the drier climates. This is in stark contrast to the Bermejo Formation of Formosa Province, Argentina where the climate and fauna suggest a more arid environment with fewer grasslands. G. jatunkhirkhi specifically is known only from Andean climate of Eastern Cordillera in Bolivia, causing it to evolve to be smaller in size than lowland species due to less support for larger masses. G. jatunkhirkhi is not the only example of this in Xenarthra, with species of Panochthus and Pleurolestodon evolving to be smaller in size in mountainous regions.

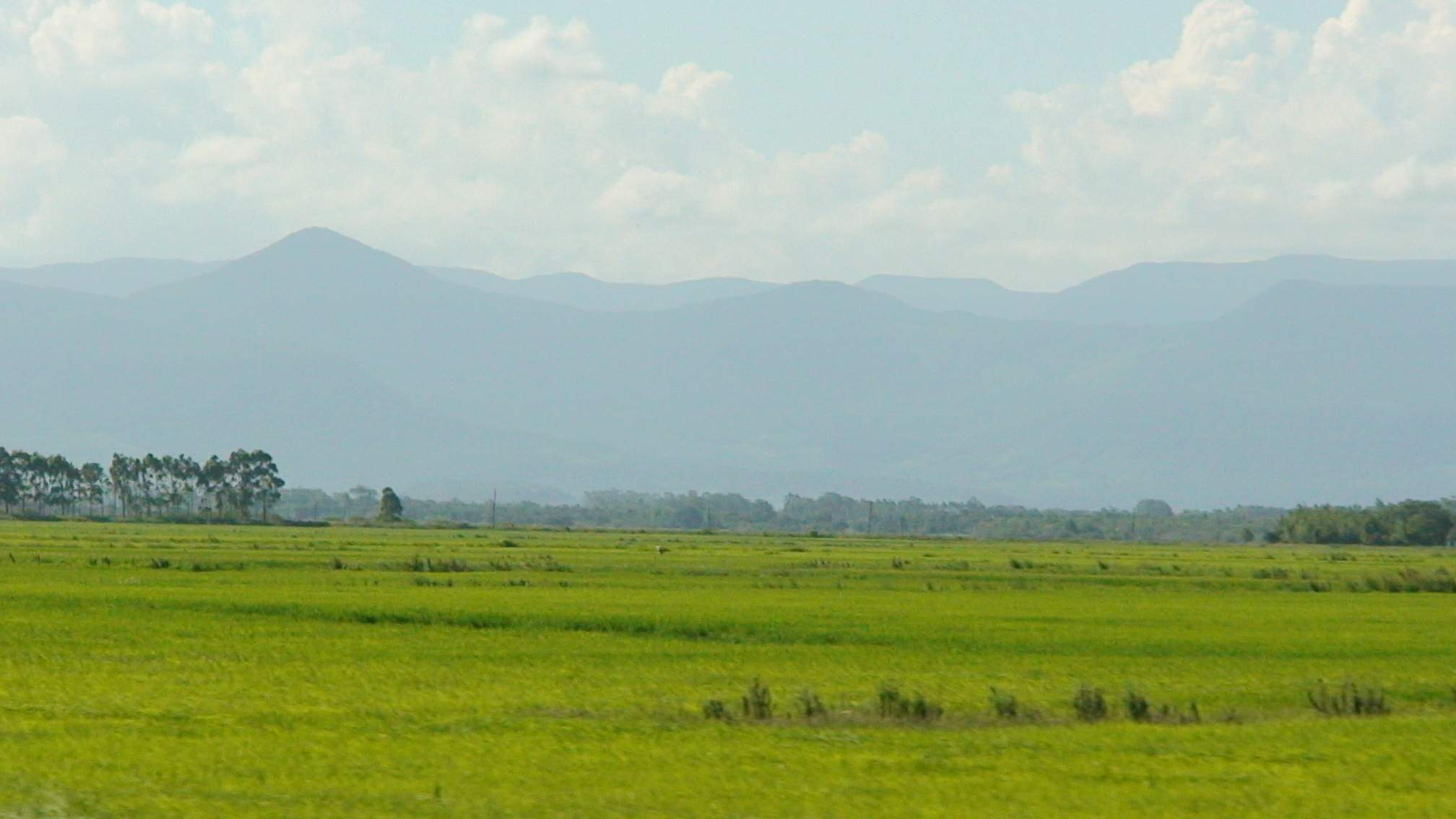
The Pampas, where Glyptodon was a grazer

During the Ensenadan and Marplatan, Glyptodon coexisted with a variety of mammals unique to the period such as the notoungulate Mesotherium, canid Theriodictis, and a species of the giant bear Arctotherium. In areas such as Uruguay, fossils of Glyptodon have been unearthed alongside the contemporary glyptodontines Doedicurus, Neuryurus, Panochthus; armadillos Chaetophractus, Propaeopus, and Eutatus; and the herbivorous pampathere Pampatherium. As for their distant relatives the ground sloths, the giant Megatherium is known, in addition to two species of the scelidothere Catonyx, and the mylodontid genera Mylodon and Glossotherium. Some other groups are known, including the unusual litopterns Macrauchenia and Neolicaphrium, notoungulate Toxodon, massive proboscidean Notiomastodon, and the equids Equus neogeus and Hippidion. Various artiodactyls have been recorded, including the peccaries Catagonus and Tayassu peccari, extinct deer Morenelaphus and Antifer, and two genera of llamas including Hemiauchenia and Lama. A variety of carnivorans have been recorded, such as the "saber-toothed" Smilodon, the bear Arctotherium bonariense, and the wolf-like canids Protocyon, and Dusicyon. Rodents too have been found, such as Holochilus, Hydrochoerus (capybara), Cavia, and Microcavia. Some of the youngest "terror-bird" fossils from Psilopterus have been unearthed in the area.

Material previously assigned to Glyptodon in northeast Brazil has been reassigned to Glyptotherium, restricting the Brazilian distribution of Glyptodon to the southern provinces. However, two osteoderms with characteristics similar to those of Glyptodon have been found in Sergipe state in the northeast, suggesting that both genera occurred in this region during the Pleistocene. Glyptodon's northernmost locality comes from Pleistocene deposits in central Colombia, though many specimens formerly attributed to the genus come from the bordering country of Venezuela.

=== Predation and relationship with humans ===
Glyptodon coexisted with a variety of large predators including the cat Smilodon, jaguars, and canid Protocyon. This belief is furthered by the discovery of fractured dorsal armor, which implies that Glyptodon had been in physical conflict with other animals. However, isotope analyses of the collagen from Glyptodon and other mammals of the Pampas region by Bocherens et al. (2015) discovered little evidence to support the idea of predators feeding on Glyptodon. Instead, it was found that Glyptodon as well as herbivorous mammals living in denser forests made up a smaller portion of carnivore diets, whereas open grazers such as Lestodon and Macrauchenia were consumed more often. Furthermore, the appearance of secondary armor in the dermis of Glyptodon coincides with the arrival of North American predators in South America during the Great American Interchange. For this reason, it was hypothesized that the osteoderms developed as a defensive/offensive mechanism to combat the new arrivals of the area.

Smilodon may have occasionally preyed upon glyptodontines, based on a skull of Glyptotherium texanum which bears the distinctive elliptical puncture marks that best match those of the machairodont cat, indicating that the predator successfully bit into the skull through the armored cephalic shield. The Glyptotherium in question was a juvenile, with a still-developing head shield, making it far more vulnerable to the cat's attack. Although originally theorized by George Brandes to be possible in 1900, Smilodon canines could not pierce the thick carapace osteoderms of glyptodontines. Brandes imagined that the evolution of thick glyptodontine armor and long machairodont canines was an example of coevolution, but Birger Bohlin argued in 1940 that the teeth were far too fragile to do damage against glyptodontine armor.

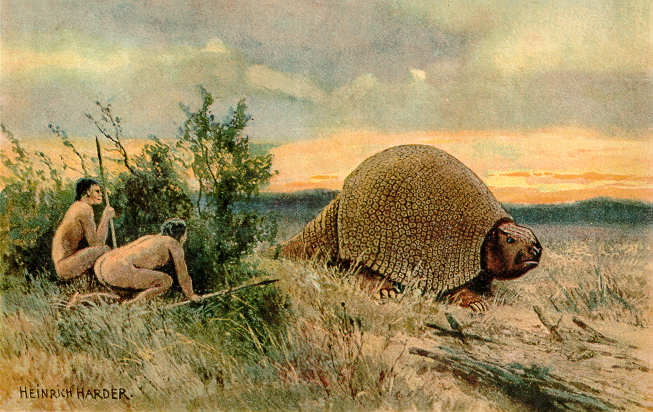
Humans hunting Glyptodon, by Heinrich Harder

The coexistence of early hunter-gatherer humans and glyptodontines in South America was first hypothesized in 1881 based on fossil discoveries from the Pampas, and many fossil discoveries from the Late Pleistocene to Early Holocene have been unearthed since that exhibit human predation on glyptodontines. No fossils of Glyptodon preserving direct interactions have been unearthed, but it did inhabit this region alongside humans. At the site of Pay Paso 1, an archaeological site in northwestern Uruguay preserving human-made spear points and other signs of culture were found associated with fossils of Glyptodon and the horse Equus. These were used for radiocarbon dating using collagen, supposedly dating to around 9,000 to 9,500 BP but these dates cannot be verified. During this period, a wide array of Xenarthrans inhabited the Pampas were hunted by humans, with evidence demonstrating that the small (300–450 kg, 660–990 lb) glyptodontine Neosclerocalyptus, the armadillo Eutatus, and the gigantic (2 ton) glyptodontine Doedicurus, the largest glyptodontine known, were hunted. The only other records of human predation from outside the Pampas area a partial carapace, which was eviscerated by humans, and several skulls preserving signs that they were dispatched by human tools. All were found in Venezuela. The discoveries there showed the first signs of human hunting on the skulls of glyptodontines. Hunters may have used the shells of dead animals as shelters in inclement weather.

Glyptodon was also a victim of parasitism, as evidenced by findings of Karethraichnus kulindros on an articulated carapace of G. clavipes, which are believed to represent traces made by tungid fleas that were related to Tunga perforans.

== Extinction ==
Glyptodon, along with all other glyptodonts became extinct around the end of the Late Pleistocene, as part of a wave of extinctions of most large mammals across the Americas. Some evidence suggests that humans drove glyptodontines to extinction. Evidence from the Campo Laborde and La Moderna archaeological sites in the Argentine Pampas suggest that Glyptodon's relatives Doedicurus and Panochthus survived until the Early Holocene, coexisting with humans for a minimum of 4,000 years. This overlap provides support for models showing that the South American Pleistocene extinctions resulted from a combination of climatic change and anthropogenic causes. These sites have been interpreted as ones used for butchering megafauna (Megatherium and Doedicurus); however, some of the chronology has been problematic and controversial, due to poor preservation of the collagen used for dating. The extinction rates in South America during the late Pleistocene were the highest out of any continent, with all endemic animals weighing over 100 kilograms (220 lb) going extinct by the middle Holocene. This supports the idea of human hunting as a drive for the extinction of Glyptodon, as the arrival of humans around 16,000 years BP to such a formerly isolated continent may have caused extinction rates to become higher.

The extinction of Glyptodon notably coincides with the end of the Antarctic Cold Reversal period in which, for 1,700 years, temperatures dropped before spiking after ending at 12.7 ka. Many climatic fluctuations occurred during the late Pleistocene between humid and dry cycles, with Glyptodon preferring drier climates. Following the Antarctic Cold Reversal, temperatures rose and the climate became more consistently humid, which then led C3 grasses to become increasingly replaced by C4 grasses and southern beech trees. These changes led vulnerable, grazing-specialized forms like glyptodontines, toxodonts, and some ground sloths to become extinct. Around 11.5 ka, temperatures peaked before again dropping, resulting in the extinction of several different genera of mammals including some megafauna. Glyptodon along with genera such as Glossotherium and Morenelaphus were wiped out, though several other groups lived for several thousand years after.
