= Uquía =

Coordinates: 23°18′S 65°21′W

Uquía (Jujuy)
- Municipality and town
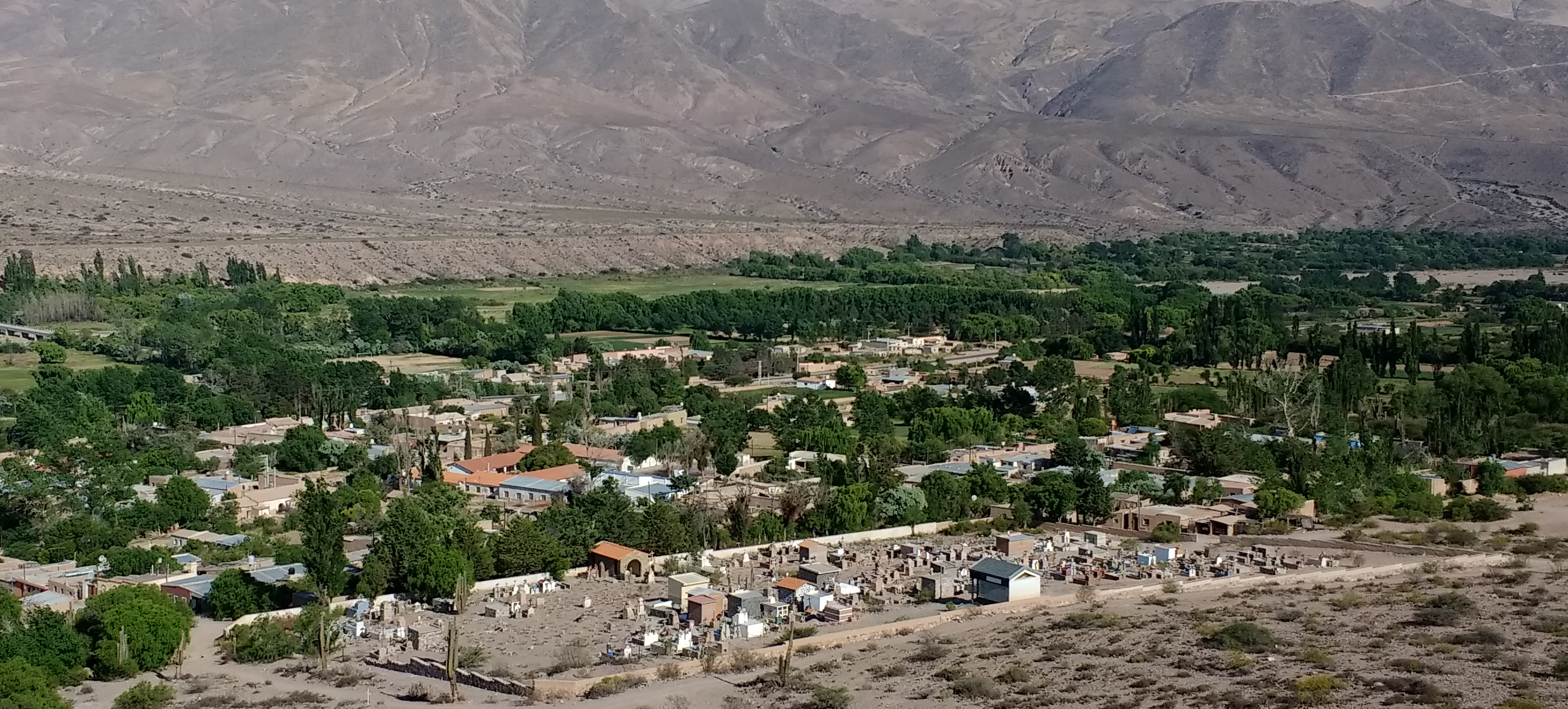
- Interactive map of Uquía (Jujuy)
- Country: Argentina
- Province: Jujuy Province
- Time zone: UTC−3 (ART)

Uquía (Jujuy) is a town and municipality in Jujuy Province in Argentina.

Historically, the village of Uquía was part of the Encomienda system under Humahuaca from the mid-16th century until the system was abolished.

Throughout the 16th, 17th, and 18th centuries, it remained under the control of the Ortiz de Zárate family, descendants of Pedro Ortiz de Zárate — the man who refounded San Salvador de Jujuy.

By the end of the 18th century, Uquía had around 50 families, totaling 236 residents according to the 1773 Registry Book. This figure refers only to the village itself, excluding surrounding hamlets.

The community always had its own Gobernador de Indios or Curaca (Indigenous governor), independent from Humahuaca’s, although the Protector de Indios was shared. The town also supported two religious brotherhoods (cofradías), which elected their stewards and sponsors each year during the festival of San Francisco de Paula.

Most residents practiced irrigated agriculture using a system of canals (acequias). As late as the mid-19th century, local farmers were involved in a legal dispute with a Mr. Eraso over the rights to water flowing through the communal acequia.

Colonial Church

Main article: Church of San Francisco de Paula (Uquía)

The church of Uquía — declared a National Historic Monument on July 14, 1941 — was built in honor of the Holy Cross and under the patronage of San Francisco de Paula.

It was originally a chapel dependent on the parish of Humahuaca. Construction was completed in 1691 by Maestre de Campo Domingo Vieyra de la Mota, who also served as vicar and ecclesiastical judge that same year. He held the beneficio (ecclesiastical benefice) of Humahuaca and Cochinoca, and served as commissioner of the Holy Crusade. Due to health issues and the demands of his multiple roles, he often spent long periods outside the Humahuaca jurisdiction.

The Jesuit influence on the church is notable, likely due to the Vieyra de la Mota family’s ties to Jujuy’s founding families — the Ortiz de Zárate, Argañaraz y Murguía, and Goyechea — all of whom were encomenderos, governors, and protectors of the Jesuit Order in Jujuy and Salta.

Notably, in 1752 or 1753, the Jesuit priest, historian, missionary, and ethnographer Pedro Lozano — considered a founding figure of Argentine scientific history — died in Uquía. According to tradition, he is buried somewhere within the nave of the church, although the exact location is unknown.
