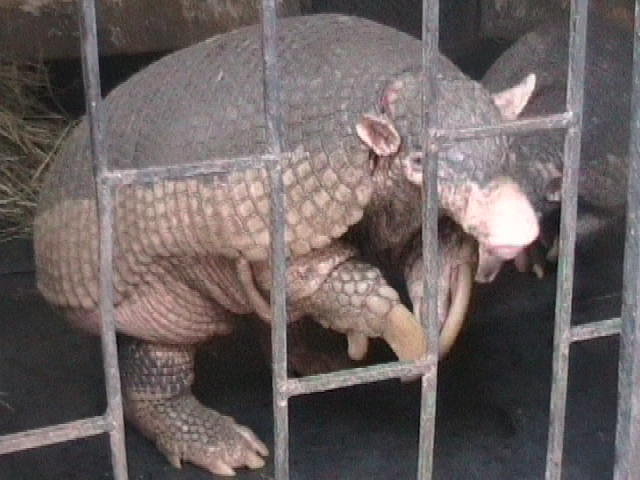
- Captive giant armadillo in Colombia

Scientific classification
- Kingdom: Animalia
- Phylum: Chordata
- Class: Mammalia
- Order: Cingulata
- Family: Chlamyphoridae
- Subfamily: Tolypeutinae; Gray, 1865

Genera
- Cabassous McMurtrie, 1831; †Kuntinaru Billet et al., 2011; Priodontes F. Cuvier, 1825; Tolypeutes Illiger, 1811; †Vetelia Ameghino, 1891
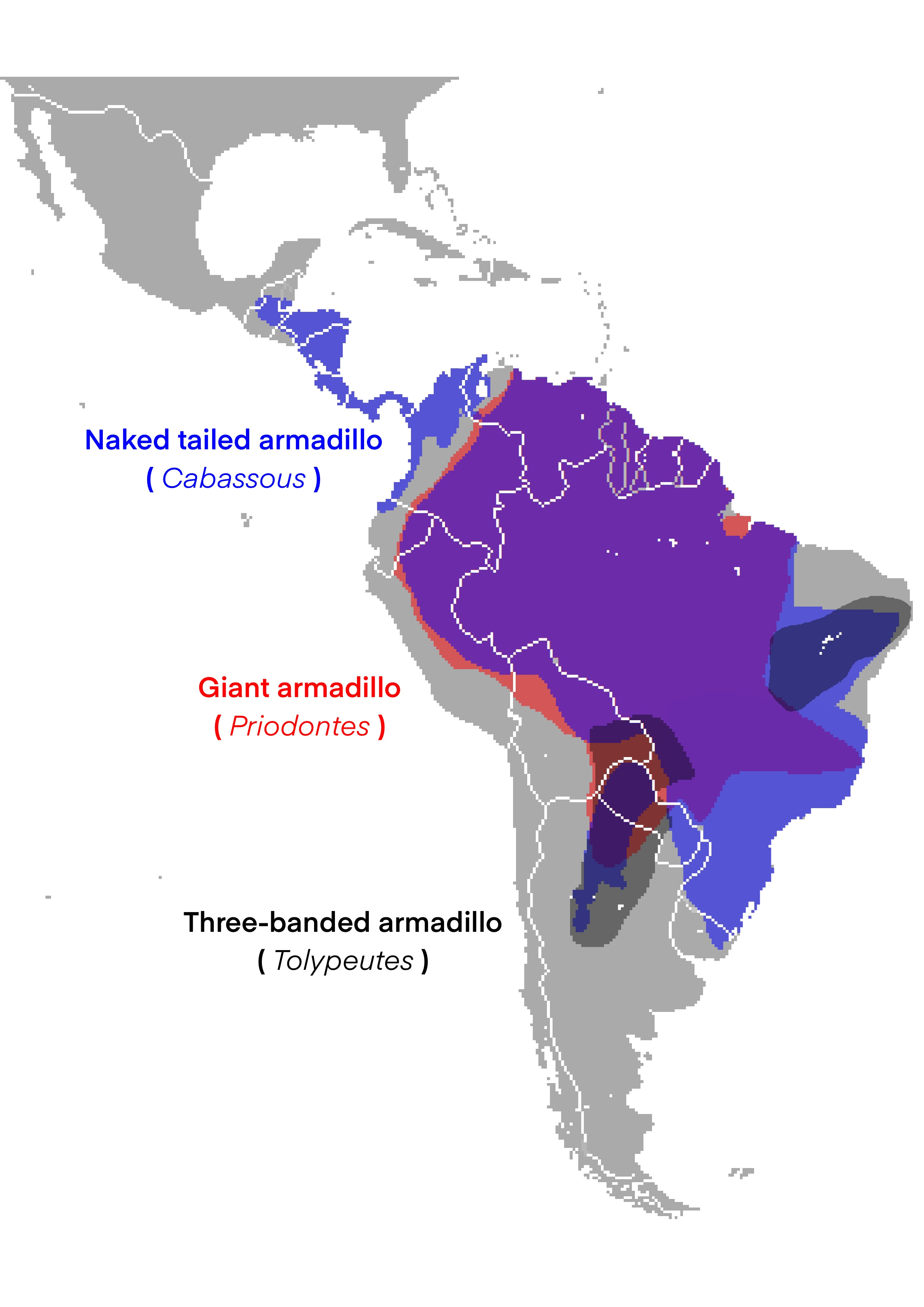

= Tolypeutinae =

Tolypeutinae Temporal range: Late Oligocene to present

Subfamily of mammals

Tolypeutinae is a subfamily of armadillos in the family Chlamyphoridae, consisting of the giant, three-banded and naked-tailed armadillos.

== Taxonomy ==
It contains the following genera:

- Cabassous
- †Kuntinaru
- Priodontes
- Tolypeutes
- †Vetelia

== Phylogeny ==
Tolypeutinae is the sister group of Chlamyphorinae, the fairy armadillos, as shown below.

Cladogram

- Cingulata
  - Dasypodidae
    ...
  - Chlamyphoridae
    - - Euphractinae
        - - - Euphractus
              E. sexcinctus
        - - Zaedyus
            Z. pichiy
          - Chaetophractus
            - C. villosus
            - - C. nationi
              - C. vellerosus
    - - - †Glyptodontinae
          - - Doedicurus
              ...
          - ...
      - - Chlamyphorinae
          - Chlamyphorus truncatus
          - Calyptophractus retusus
        - Tolypeutinae
          - - Priodontes
              - P. maximus
          - - Tolypeutes
              - T. tricinctus
              - T. matacus
            - Cabassous
              - C. tatouay
              - - C. chacoensis
                - - C. centralis
                  - C. unicinctus
