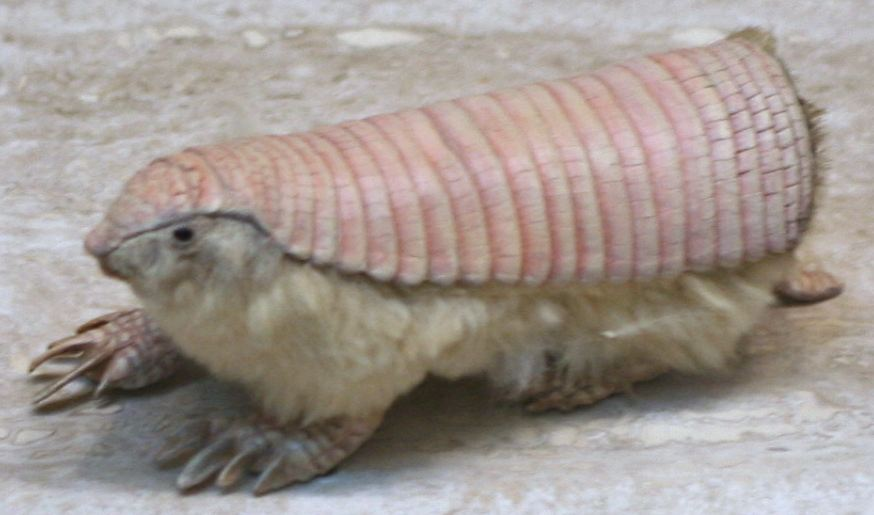
- Chlamyphorus truncatus

Scientific classification
- Kingdom: Animalia
- Phylum: Chordata
- Class: Mammalia
- Order: Cingulata
- Family: Chlamyphoridae
- Subfamily: Chlamyphorinae; Bonaparte, 1850

Genera
- Calyptophractus, Fitzinger, 1871; Chlamyphorus, Harlan, 1825
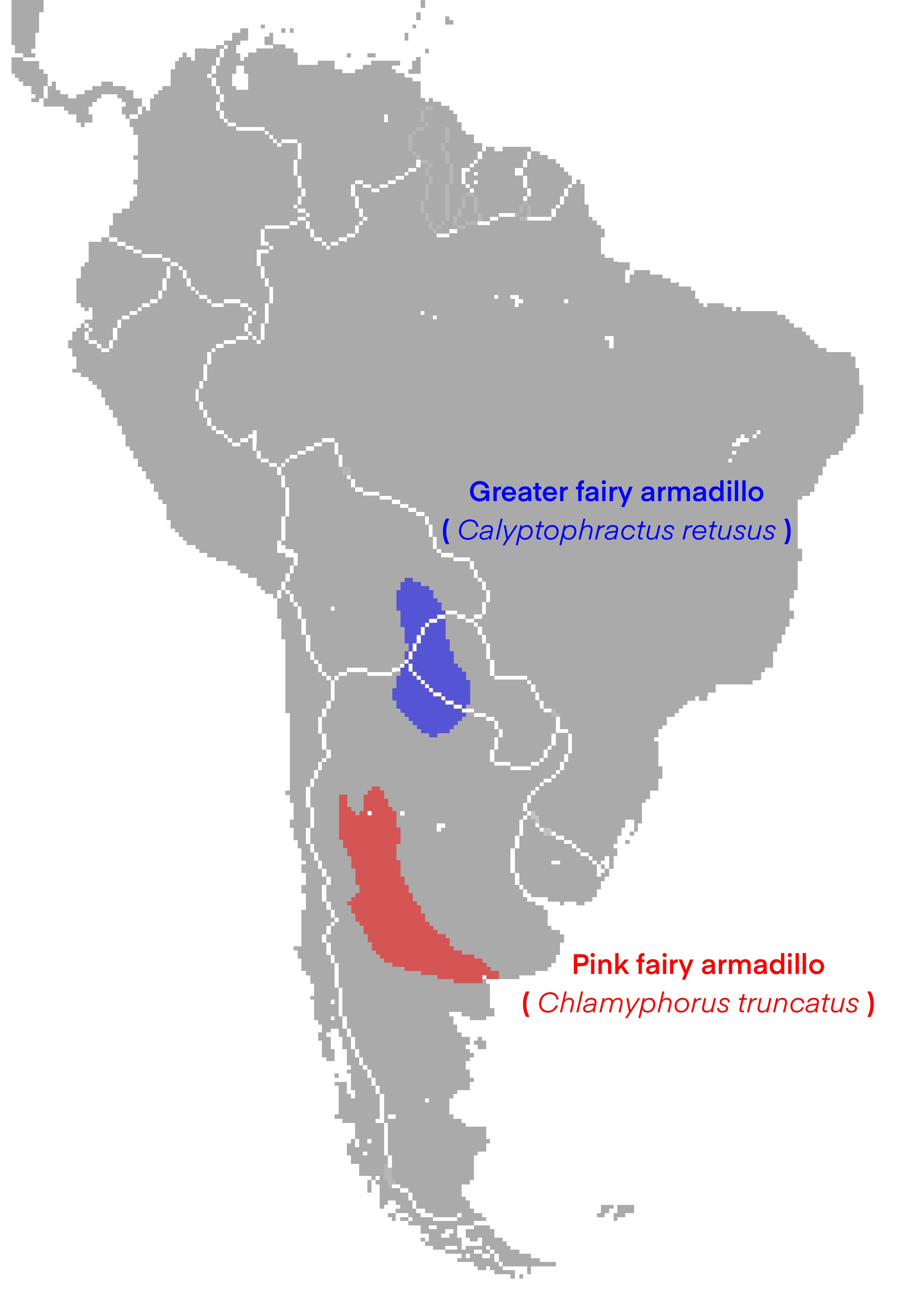

= Chlamyphorinae =

Fairy armadillo Temporal range: Late Miocene-Recent

Subfamily of mammals

Chlamyphorinae is a subfamily of South American armadillos in the family Chlamyphoridae. Members of this subfamily, the fairy armadillos, are largely fossorial and have reduced eyes and robust forearms with large claws for digging.

== Taxonomy ==
The subfamily has two monotypic extant genera and one extinct monotypic genus:

- Calyptophractus, greater fairy armadillo
- Chlamyphorus, pink fairy armadillo
- Chlamydophractus†

== Phylogeny ==
Chlamyphorinae is the sister group of Tolypeutinae (giant, three-banded and naked-tailed armadillos), as shown below.

Cladogram

- Cingulata
  - Dasypodidae
  - Chlamyphoridae
    - Euphractinae
      - Euphractus sexcinctus
      - - Zaedyus pichiy
        - - Chaetophractus villosus
          - - Chaetophractus nationi
            - C. vellerosus
    - - †Glyptodontinae (Doedicurus)
      - - Chlamyphorinae
          - Chlamyphorus truncatus
          - Calyptophractus retusus
        - Tolypeutinae
          - Priodontes maximus
          - - Tolypeutes
              - T. tricinctus
              - T. matacus
            - Cabassous
              - C. tatouay
              - - C. chacoensis
                - - C. centralis
                  - C. unicinctus
