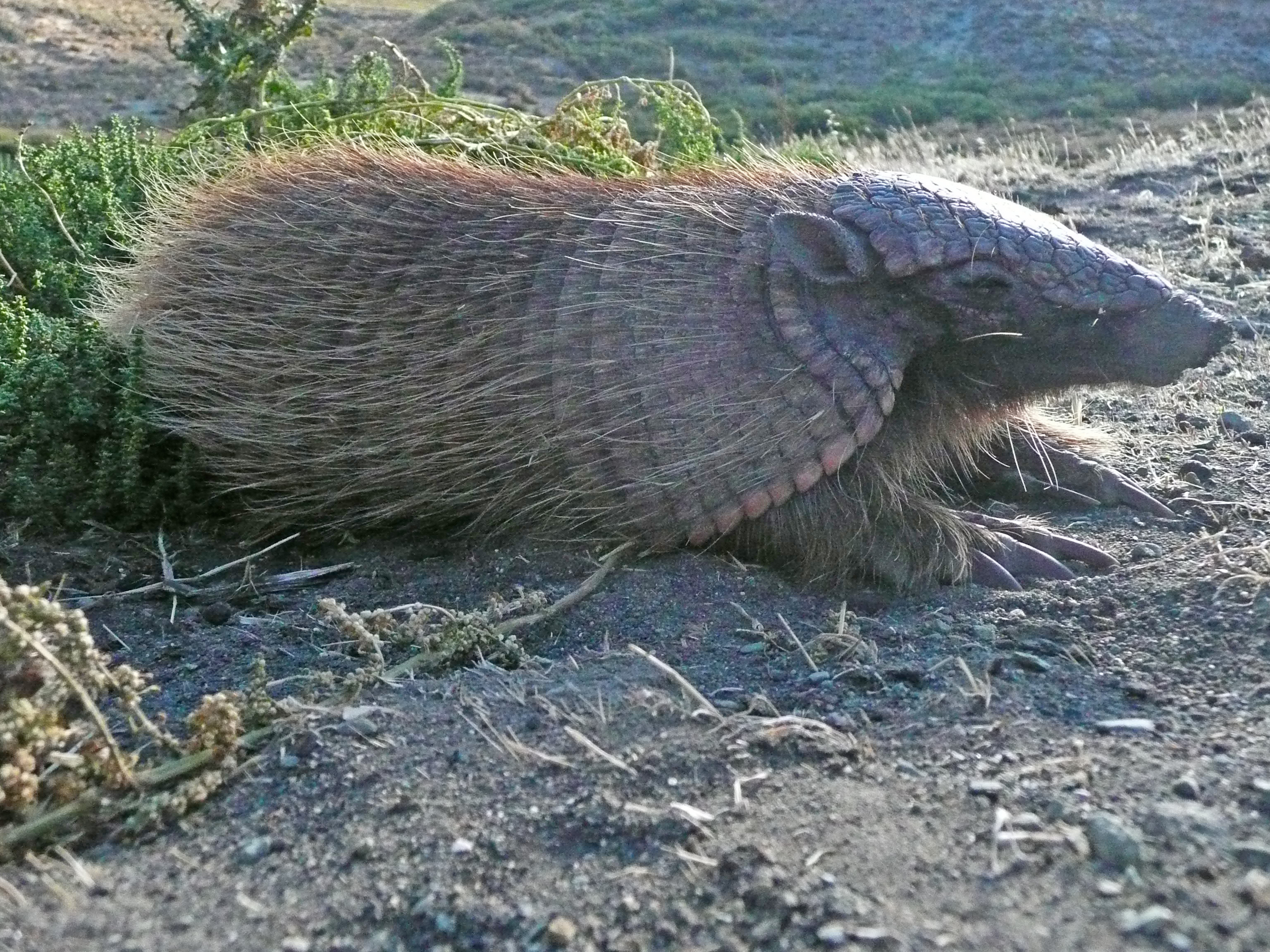
- Chaetophractus vellerosus

Scientific classification
- Kingdom: Animalia
- Phylum: Chordata
- Class: Mammalia
- Order: Cingulata
- Family: Chlamyphoridae
- Subfamily: Euphractinae; Winge 1923

Genera
- Chaetophractus Fitzinger 1871; Euphractus Wagler 1830; Zaedyus Ameghino 1889
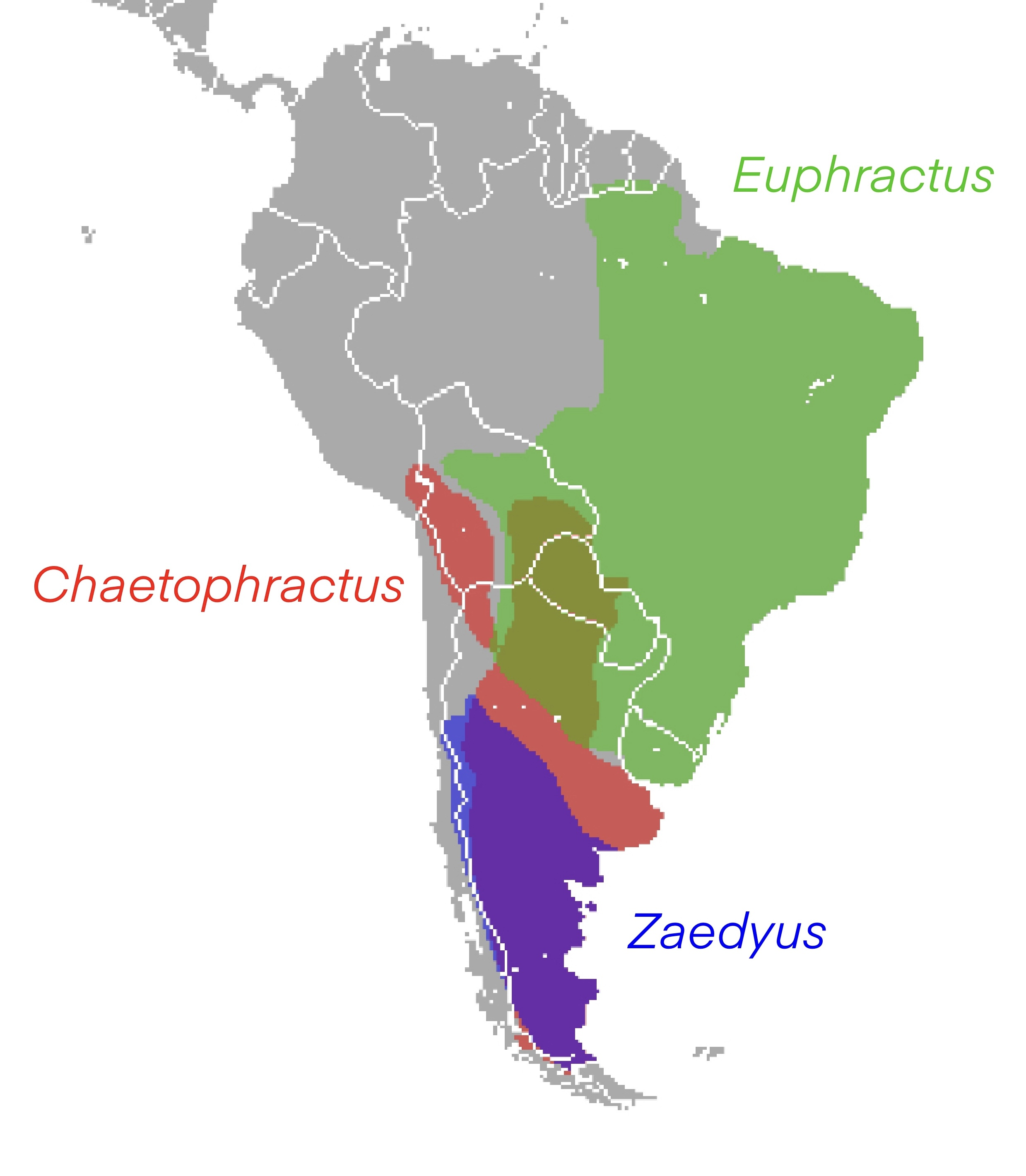

= Euphractinae =

Euphractinae Temporal range: Middle Eocene (Casamayoran)-Recent ~50–0 Ma

Subfamily of mammals

Euphractinae is an armadillo subfamily in the family Chlamyphoridae.

Euphractinae are known for having a well developed osteoderm that has large cavities filled with adipose tissue, and more hair follicles with well developed sebaceous glands in comparison to the Dasypodidae sub family. These are believed to be evolutionary adaptations in the Euphractinae to support it in the cooler climate that it usually lives in.

== Taxonomy ==
It contains the following genera:

- Chaetophractus, hairy armadillos
- Euphractus, six-banded armadillos
- Zaedyus, pichis

Extinct genera include:

- Paleuphractus
- Parutaetus
- Doellotatus
- Proeuphractus
- Macroeuphractus

== Phylogeny ==
A mitochondrial DNA investigation has concluded that Euphractinae is the sister group of a clade consisting of Chlamyphorinae (fairy armadillos) and Tolypeutinae (giant, three-banded and naked-tailed armadillos) along with extinct glyptodonts, as shown below.

Cladogram

- Cingulata
  - Dasypodidae
  - Chlamyphoridae
    - Euphractinae
      - Euphractus sexcinctus
      - - Zaedyus pichiy
        - - Chaetophractus villosus
          - - Chaetophractus nationi
            - C. vellerosus
    - - †Glyptodontinae (Doedicurus)
      - - Chlamyphorinae
          - Chlamyphorus truncatus
          - Calyptophractus retusus
        - Tolypeutinae
          - Priodontes maximus
          - - Tolypeutes
              - T. tricinctus
              - T. matacus
            - Cabassous
              - C. tatouay
              - - C. chacoensis
                - - C. centralis
                  - C. unicinctus
