= Hairy armadillo =

Hairy armadillo may refer to:

- Andean hairy armadillo (Chaetophractus nationi), present in Bolivia
- Big hairy armadillo (Chaetophractus villosus), one of the largest and most numerous armadillos in southern South America
- Hairy long-nosed armadillo (Dasypus pilosus), in the family Dasypodidae; endemic to Peru
- Screaming hairy armadillo (Chaetophractus vellerosus), a burrowing armadillo found in the central and southern parts of South America
