= Proeuphractus =

Proeuphractus Temporal range: Early-Late Miocene- ~20–7 Ma

Scientific classification
- Kingdom: Animalia
- Phylum: Chordata
- Class: Mammalia
- Order: Cingulata
- Family: Chlamyphoridae
- Subfamily: Euphractinae
- Genus: †Proeuphractus; Ameghino, 1886

Type species
- †Proeuphractus limpidus Ameghino 1886

Species
- P. laevis Ameghino 1897; P. limpidus Ameghino 1886; P. limus Ameghino 1891; P. nanus Ameghino 1891; P. recens Ameghino 1887; P. setiger Ameghino 1897

Extinct genus of mammals

Proeuphractus is an extinct genus of xenarthran, related to the modern armadillos. It lived from the Early to the Late Miocene, and its fossilized remains were discovered in South America.

== Description ==
This animal was quite similar to the modern six-banded armadillo, but it was probably larger than the giant armadillo. Proeuphractus had a carapace similar to that of modern armadillos, with complete mobile bands of osteoderms, allowing the animal to at least partially roll up. The dermal osteoderms were robust and had the same basic ornamentation, except along the carapace axis, where the osteoderms presented a torsion of the central figure towards the postero-external corner, and were devoid of central follicle. Hair dimples could however be observed along the lateral margins and the posterior border.

== Classification ==
The genus Proeuphractus was first described in 1886 by Florentino Ameghino, based on fossil remains found in Argentina in Late Miocene terrains. The type species is Proeuphractus limpidus, whose fossils have also been found in Uruguay. Several other species were later attributed to the genus, such as Proeuphractus laevis, P. limus, P. nanus, P. recens and P. setiger, the latter being the most ancient species, from the Early Miocene.

Proeuphractus was initially considered a member of the subfamily Euphractinae, close to the origin of the extant genus Euphractus (hence the genus name Proeuphractus), but more recent studies tends to indicate that it was nested at the basis of the subfamily Euphractinae, along with its relative Macroeuphractus.

== Bibliography ==
- F. Ameghino. 1897. Mammiféres crétacés de l’Argentine (Deuxième contribution à la connaissance de la fauna mammalogique de couches à Pyrotherium) [Cretaceous mammals of Argentina (second contribution to the knowledge of the mammalian fauna of the Pyrotherium Beds)]. Boletin Instituto Geografico Argentino 18(4–9):406-521
- F. Ameghino. 1889. Contribución al conocimiento de los mamíferos fósiles de la República Argentina [Contribution to the knowledge of the fossil mammals of the Argentine Republic]. Actas de la Academia Nacional de Ciencias de la República Argentina en Córdoba 6:xxxii-1027
- R. Lydekker. 1894. Contributions to a knowledge of the Fossil Vertebrates of Argentina. Part II. 2. The extinct edentates of Argentina. Anales del Museo de La Plata. Paleontología Argentina 3:1-118
- G. J. Scillato-Yané, F. Góis, A. E. Zurita, A. A. Carlini, L. R. González-Ruiz, C. M. Krmpotic, C. Oliva and M. Zamorano. 2013. Los cingulata (Mammalia, Xenarthra) del "Conglomerado Osífero" (Mioceno tardío) de la Formación Ituzaingó de Entre Ríos, Argentina. In D. Brandoni, J.I. Noriega (eds.), El Neógeno de la Mesopotamia argentina 14:118-134
- ^ Kieren J. Mitchell; Agustin Scanferla; Esteban Soibelzon; Ricardo Bonini; Javier Ochoa; Alan Cooper (2016). "Ancient DNA from the extinct South American giant glyptodont Doedicurus sp. (Xenarthra: Glyptodontidae) reveals that glyptodonts evolved from Eocene armadillos". Molecular Ecology. 25 (14): 3499–3508.
