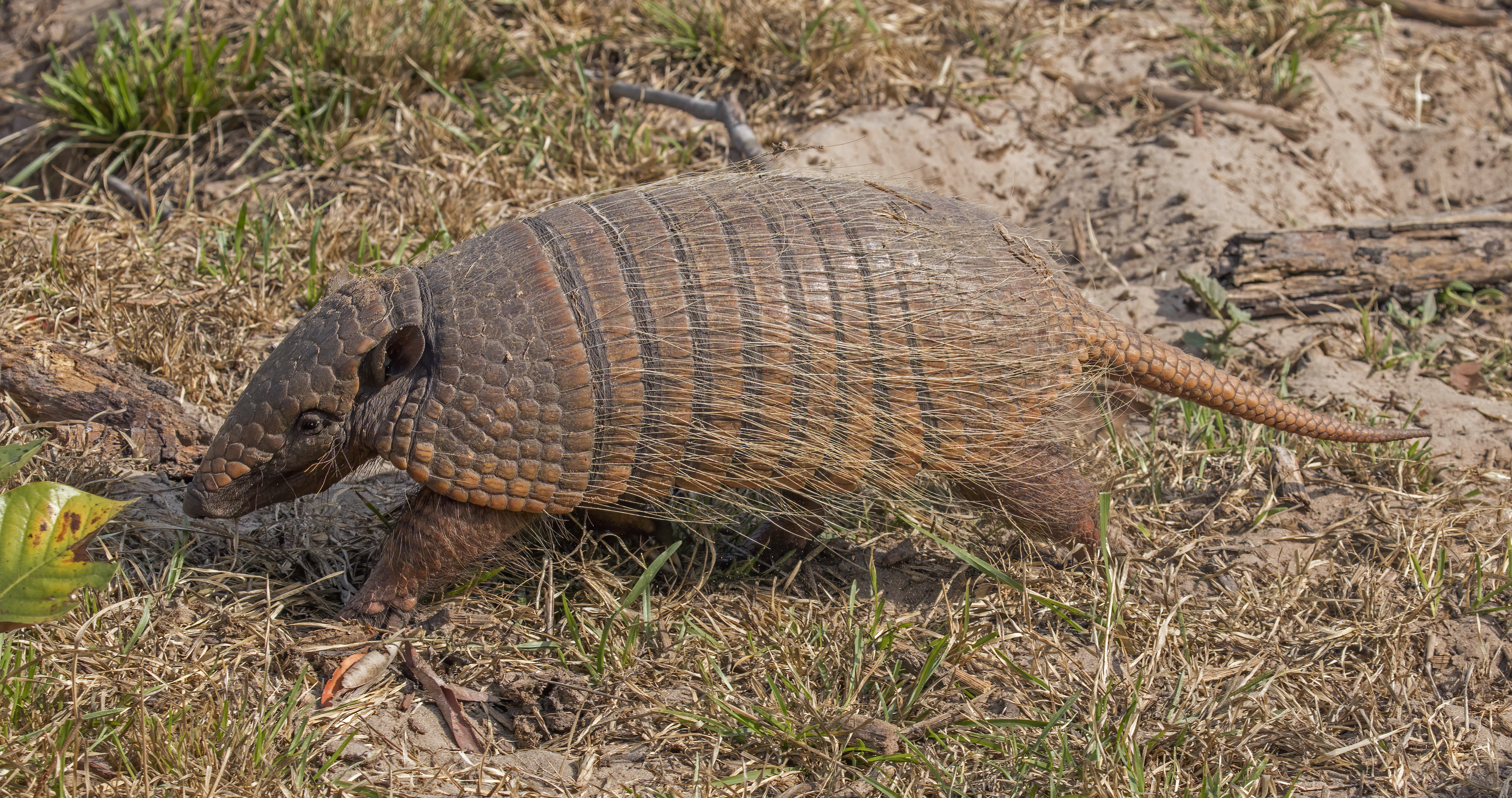
- In the Pantanal, Brazil

Conservation status
- Least Concern (IUCN 3.1)

Scientific classification
- Kingdom: Animalia
- Phylum: Chordata
- Class: Mammalia
- Order: Cingulata
- Family: Chlamyphoridae
- Subfamily: Euphractinae
- Genus: Euphractus; Wagler, 1830
- Species: E. sexcinctus

Binomial name
- Euphractus sexcinctus (Linnaeus, 1758)
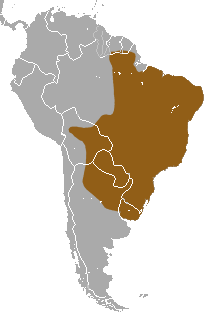
- Range of the six-banded armadillo

Synonyms
- List: Dasypus encoubert Desmarest, 1822; Dasypus flavipes G. Fischer, 1814; Dasypus sexcinctus Linnaeus, 1758; Loricatus flavimanus Desmarest, 1804; Scleropleura bruneti Milne-Edwards, 1872; Tatus sexcinctus Schinz, 1824; Euphractus hexcinctus

= Six-banded armadillo =

Species of mammal

The six-banded armadillo (Euphractus sexcinctus), also known as the yellow armadillo, is an armadillo found in South America. The sole extant member of its genus, it was first described by Swedish zoologist Carl Linnaeus in 1758. The six-banded armadillo is typically between 40 and 50 centimeters (16 and 20 in) in head-and-body length, and weighs 3.2 to 6.5 kilograms (7.1 to 14.3 lb). The carapace (hard shell on the back) is pale yellow to reddish brown, marked by scales of equal length, and scantily covered by buff to white bristle-like hairs. The forefeet have five distinct toes, each with moderately developed claws.

Six-banded armadillos are efficient diggers and form burrows to live in and search for prey. The armadillo is alert and primarily solitary. An omnivore, it feeds on insects, ants, carrion, and plant material. Due to their poor eyesight, armadillos rely on their sense of smell to detect prey and predators. Births take place throughout the year; gestation is 60 to 64 days long, after which a litter of one to three is born. Weaning occurs at one month, and juveniles mature by nine months. The six-banded armadillo inhabits savannas, primary and secondary forests, cerrados, shrublands, and deciduous forests. Fairly common, its range spans from Brazil and southern Suriname in the northeast through Bolivia, Paraguay, and Uruguay into northern Argentina in the southeast. The International Union for the Conservation of Nature and Natural Resources (IUCN) classifies it as least concern, and there are no major threats to its survival.

== Taxonomy and etymology ==
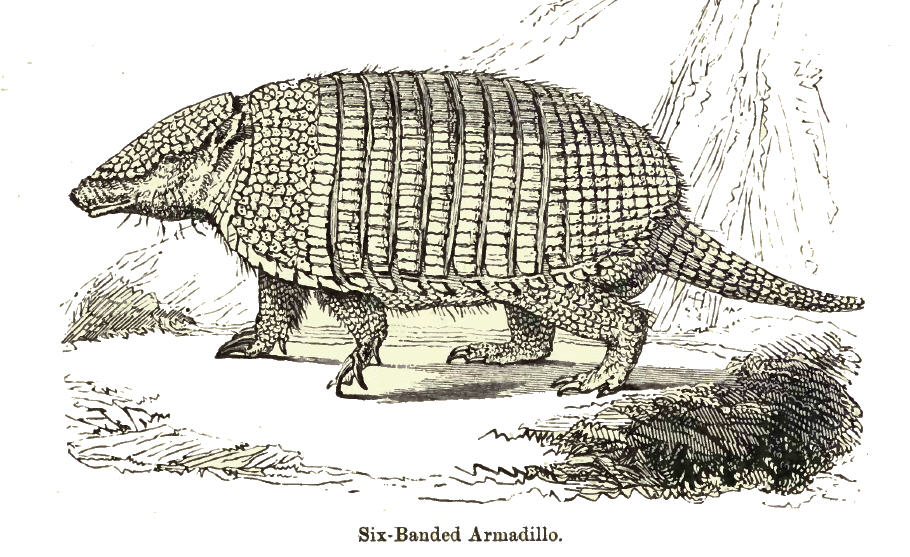
Drawing of the six-banded armadillo

The six-banded armadillo is the sole member of the genus Euphractus and is placed in the family Chlamyphoridae. It was first described by Swedish zoologist Carl Linnaeus as Dasypus sexcinctus in 1758. The genera Chaetophractus (hairy armadillos) and Zaedyus (pichi) have at times been included in Euphractus, though karyotypical, immunological and morphological analyses oppose this. Fossil Euphractus excavated in Lagoa Santa, Minas Gerais (Brazil), Buenos Aires (Argentina), and Tarija (Bolivia) date back to the Pleistocene.

The following five subspecies are recognized:

- E. s. boliviae Thomas, 1907: Occurs in Gran Chaco (Brazil).
- E. s. flavimanus Desmarest, 1804: Occurs in Mato Grosso (Brazil), eastern Paraguay, Uruguay and northeastern Argentina.
- E. s. setosus Wied, 1826: Occurs in extreme southeastern Brazil.
- E. s. sexcinctus Linnaeus, 1758: Occurs in southeastern Brazil.
- E. s. tucumanus Thomas, 1911: Occurs in Catamarca and Tucumán Provinces (Argentina).

Six-banded armadillo

A 2006 morphological study of the phylogeny of armadillos showed that Chaetophractus, Chlamyphorus, Euphractus and Zaedyus form a monophyletic clade. The cladogram below (based only on the extant species) is based on this study.

- - Chlamyphorus
  - - Zaedyus
    - - Euphractus
      - Chaetophractus

However, a mitochondrial DNA investigation has concluded that Chlamyphorinae (fairy armadillos) is the sister group of Tolypeutinae (giant, three-banded and naked-tailed armadillos), with Euphractinae (hairy, six-banded and pichi armadillos) having diverged earlier.

The six-banded armadillo differs from others in the subfamily Euphractinae, which also contains the pichi and hairy armadillos, in having a narrow head and six to seven movable bands on the carapace (the hard shell on the back). Other names for this armadillo are tatu peludo and tatu peba (in Portuguese), and 'yellow armadillo'.

== Description ==
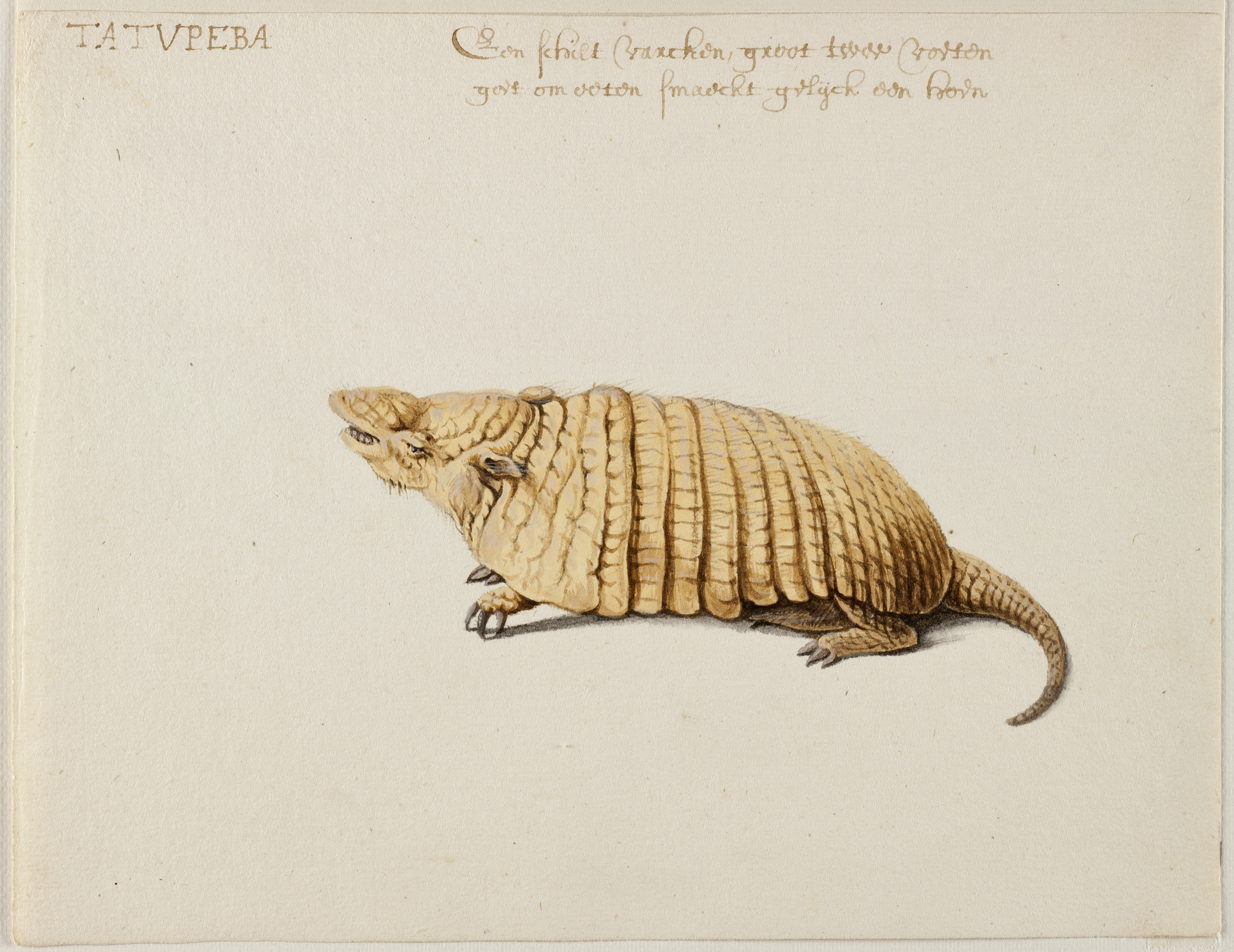
Six-banded armadillo painted by Frans Post, 1637–1644

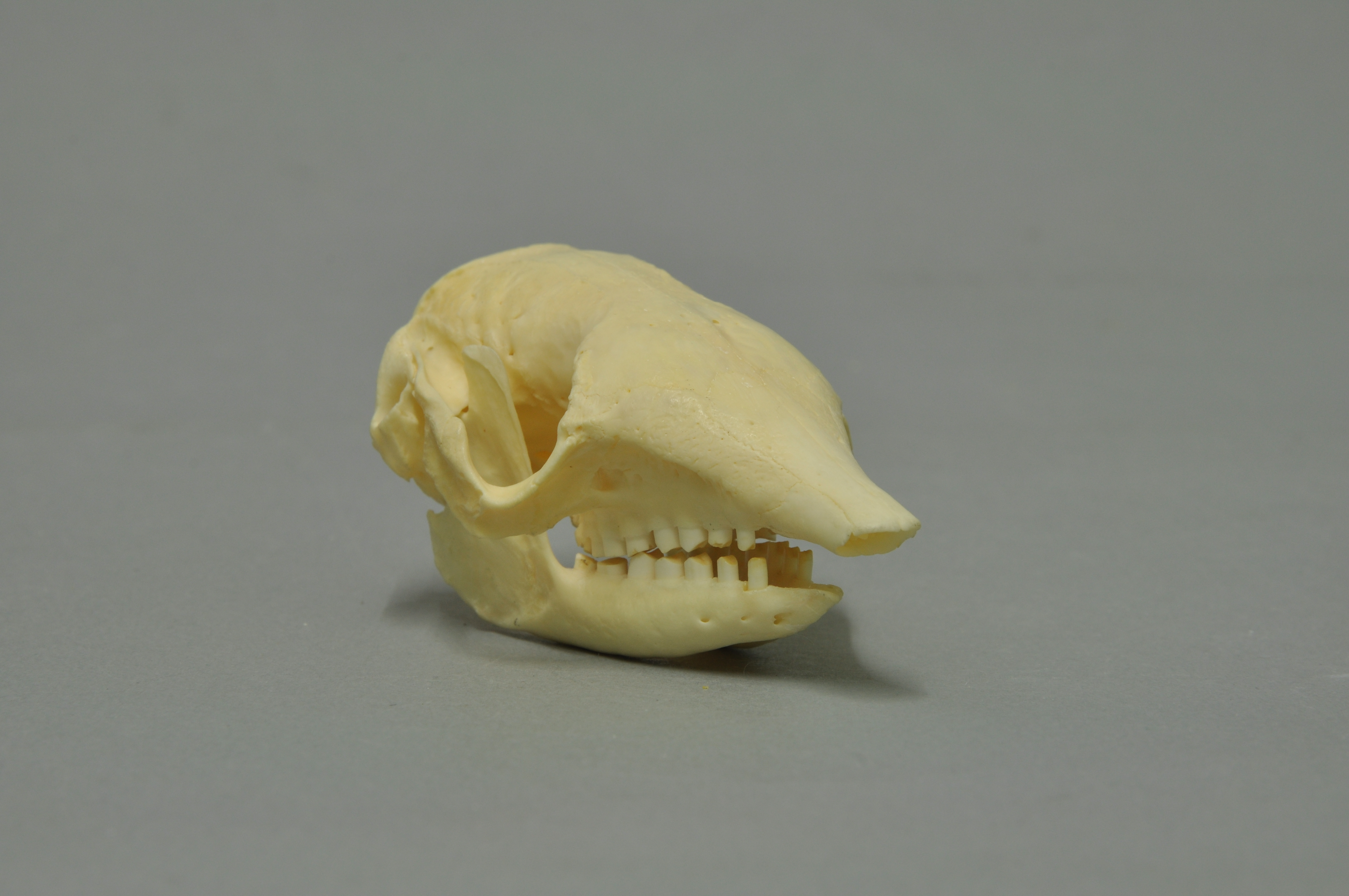
Skull of a six-banded armadillo

The six-banded armadillo is the largest in Euphractinae, which also contains the pichi and hairy armadillos; in fact, it is the third largest armadillo after the giant armadillo and the greater long-nosed armadillo. This armadillo is typically between 40 and 50 centimeters (16 and 20 in) in head-and-body length, and weighs 3.2 to 6.5 kilograms (7.1 to 14.3 lb). The carapace is pale yellow to reddish brown (though not a dark shade of brown or black), marked by scales of equal length, and scantily covered by buff to white bristle-like hairs – unlike the hairy armadillos, that are covered by dense hairs. The shell narrows to 70 to 80 percent of its original width towards the top of the head, which is covered by plates arranged in a definite pattern. The forefeet have five distinct toes, each with moderately developed claws, of which the third is the longest.

Like the other euphractines and the pink fairy armadillo, the six-banded armadillo has a tympanic bulla; the ears are 32 to 47 millimeters (1.3 to 1.9 in) long. There are 9 pairs of teeth on the upper jaw and 10 pairs on the lower jaw; the teeth are large and strong and are assisted by strong muscles for chewing. A row of scutes, each 13.5–18.4 millimeters (0.53–0.72 in) wide, extends along the back of the neck. The tail, 12–24 centimeters (4.7–9.4 in) long, is covered by two to four bands of plates on the underside. Some of these plates have holes for scent gland secretions, a feature seen in no other armadillo except a few big hairy armadillos.

== Ecology and behavior ==
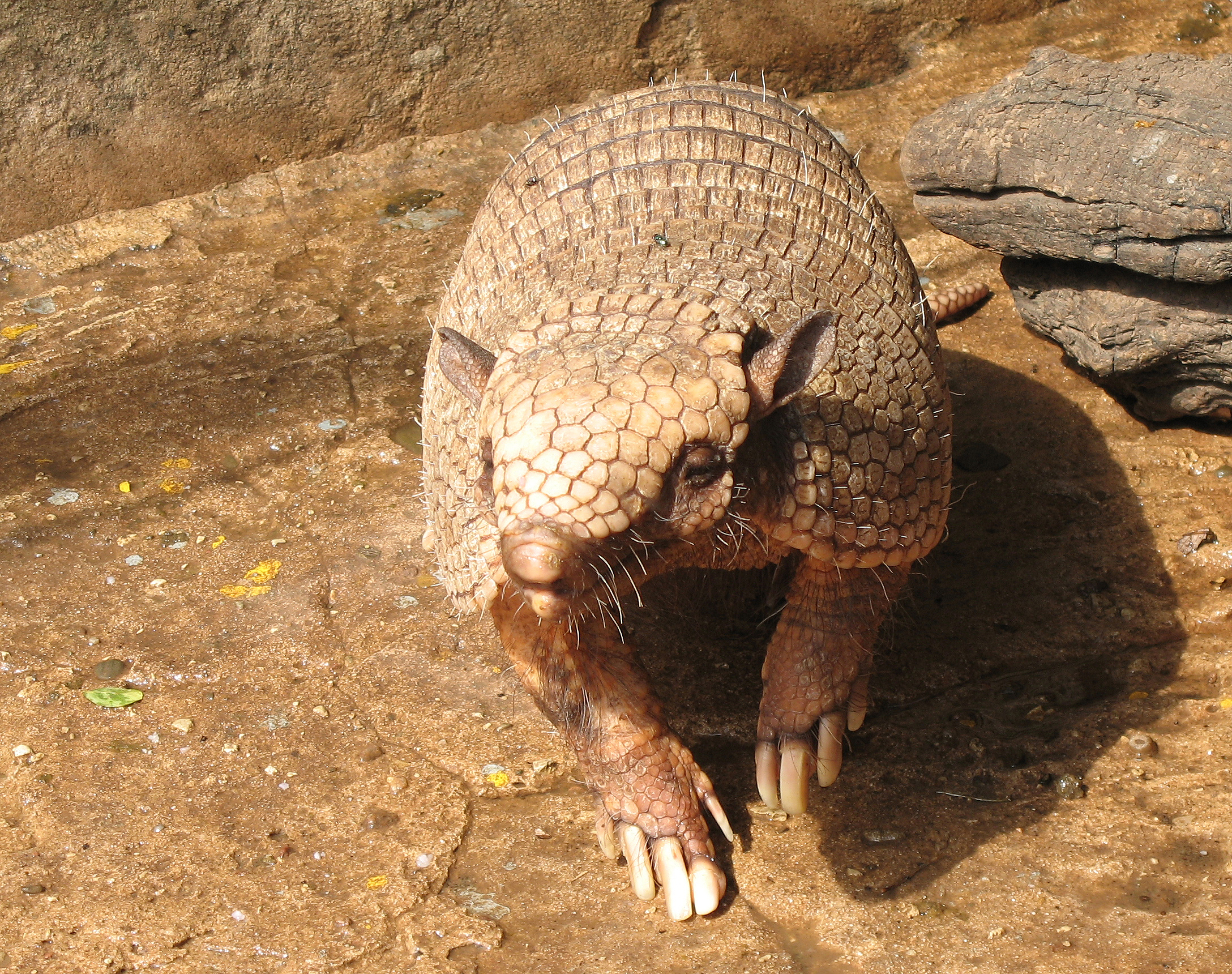
Close view of a six-banded armadillo

Different studies have recorded different activity patterns for the six-banded armadillo – some consider it to be diurnal (active mainly during the day), while others show it is nocturnal (active mainly at night). It is an alert animal; unlike other armadillos, it flees on sensing danger and bites if handled. Primarily solitary, six-banded armadillos will congregate only to feed on carrions. A 1983 study in eastern Brazil calculated the mean home range size as 93.3 hectares (0.360 sq mi). An efficient digger, this armadillo can dig U-shaped burrows with a single opening, typically in dry areas; the burrows may or may not be permanent shelters. These burrows can go deep into the ground and help in foraging. A study of burrows dug by the giant, six-banded, southern naked-tailed and greater naked-tailed armadillos showed that all burrows were similar in the slopes of the burrow and the surrounding soil, and the direction of the entrance; the location preferred for them and time spent in them, however, differed. Burrows could be easily differentiated by their dimensions; burrows of six-banded armadillos had a mean height of 19 centimeters (7.5 in) and were 21 centimeters (8.3 in) wide at the opening, and narrowed down to 10 centimeters (3.9 in) with a height of 16 centimeters (6.3 in) to 21 centimeters (8.3 in) into the burrow. Generally, burrows become wide enough to allow the armadillo to turn around as the depth increases. Unlike the moles, that throw the soil to a side while digging, the six-banded armadillo digs with its forefeet and throws the soil behind with its hindfeet. Armadillos defecate outside their burrows.

=== Diet ===
The six-banded armadillo is an omnivore that feeds on carrion, small invertebrates, insects, ants, fruits (typically from bromeliads), palm nuts and tubers. A 2004 study classified it as a "carnivore-omnivore". In a study in a Brazilian ranch, plant material was found to predominate in the diet. Captive individuals have been observed preying upon large rats. Due to their poor eyesight, armadillos rely on their sense of smell to detect prey and predators. To kill the prey, the armadillo stands on it, grabs it using its teeth and tears it into pieces. Six-banded armadillos can store subcutaneous fat to support themselves at times when food is scarce; this fat can increase the weight to 8 to 11 kilograms (18 to 24 lb).

=== Reproduction ===
Breeding behaviour has been observed in captivity. Births take place throughout the year. After a gestational period of 60 to 64 days, a litter of one to three is born. Each newborn weighs 95 to 110 grams (3.4 to 3.9 oz), and has a hairless and soft carapace; it can give out soft clicks. The pregnant female builds a nest before giving birth; if disturbed, the mother can react aggressively and shift her offspring. The eyes, closed at birth, open at 22 to 25 days. Weaning occurs at one month and the juveniles mature by nine months. One of the armadillos lived for nearly 18 years.

== Habitat and distribution ==
The six-banded armadillo inhabits savannas, primary and secondary forests, cerrados, shrublands and deciduous forests. It can adapt to a variety of habitats; it can even occur on agricultural lands and has been recorded at 1,600 meters (5,200 ft) above the sea level. A study in southeastern Brazil estimated the population density at 0.14 individuals per hectare. The same study showed that the six-banded armadillo often displaces and is displaced by the sympatric southern naked-tail armadillo; this was considered to be helpful in their coexistence. The six-banded armadillo has a wide distribution in South America, from Brazil and southern Suriname in the northeast through Bolivia, Paraguay and Uruguay into northern Argentina in the southeast. Its presence in Peru is doubted.

== Threats and conservation ==
The IUCN classifies the six-banded armadillo as least concern, due to its wide distribution, good degree of tolerance and presumably large populations. Moreover, it occurs in several protected areas. Though there are no major threats to its survival, six-banded armadillo populations north of the Amazon River might be declining due to few patches of savannas, human settlement and industrial expansion. Moreover, these armadillos are reportedly hunted for medicinal purposes, though their meat is believed to have an unpalatable taste; in some areas in its range, people detest its meat due to the belief that the animal feeds on "rotting human corpses". A 2011 study compared the six- and nine-banded armadillos in Paraíba (Brazil); nine-banded armadillo meat tasted better according to the majority of the locals. Consumption of six-banded armadillo meat was not considered safe by the locals for people with certain health problems, such as injuries and hepatitis, a taboo that had stemmed probably from concerns over the armadillo's diet. Six-banded armadillos often raid cropfields to feed on tender plants; farmers are known to use traps aided by corn baits for these animals to curb the menace.
