= Kuntinaru =

Kuntinaru Temporal range: Late Oligocene (Deseadan) ~26.0 Ma

Scientific classification
- Domain: Eukaryota
- Kingdom: Animalia
- Phylum: Chordata
- Class: Mammalia
- Order: Cingulata
- Family: Chlamyphoridae
- Subfamily: Tolypeutinae
- Genus: †Kuntinaru; Billet et al., 2011

Species
- K. boliviensis Billet et al., 2011 (type)

Extinct genus of mammals

Kuntinaru is an extinct genus of tolypeutine chlamyphorid armadillo which existed in Bolivia, during the Late Oligocene (Deseadan age). It is known from the holotype MNHN-SAL 1024, skull missing the apex of the rostrum and the paratype MNHN-SAL 3, second skull missing the apex of the rostrum, recovered from the Salla Formation, Salla, Department of La Paz, Bolivia. It was first named by Guillaume Billet, Lionel Hautier, Christian de Muizon and Xavier Valentin in 2011 and the type species is Kuntinaru boliviensis.
