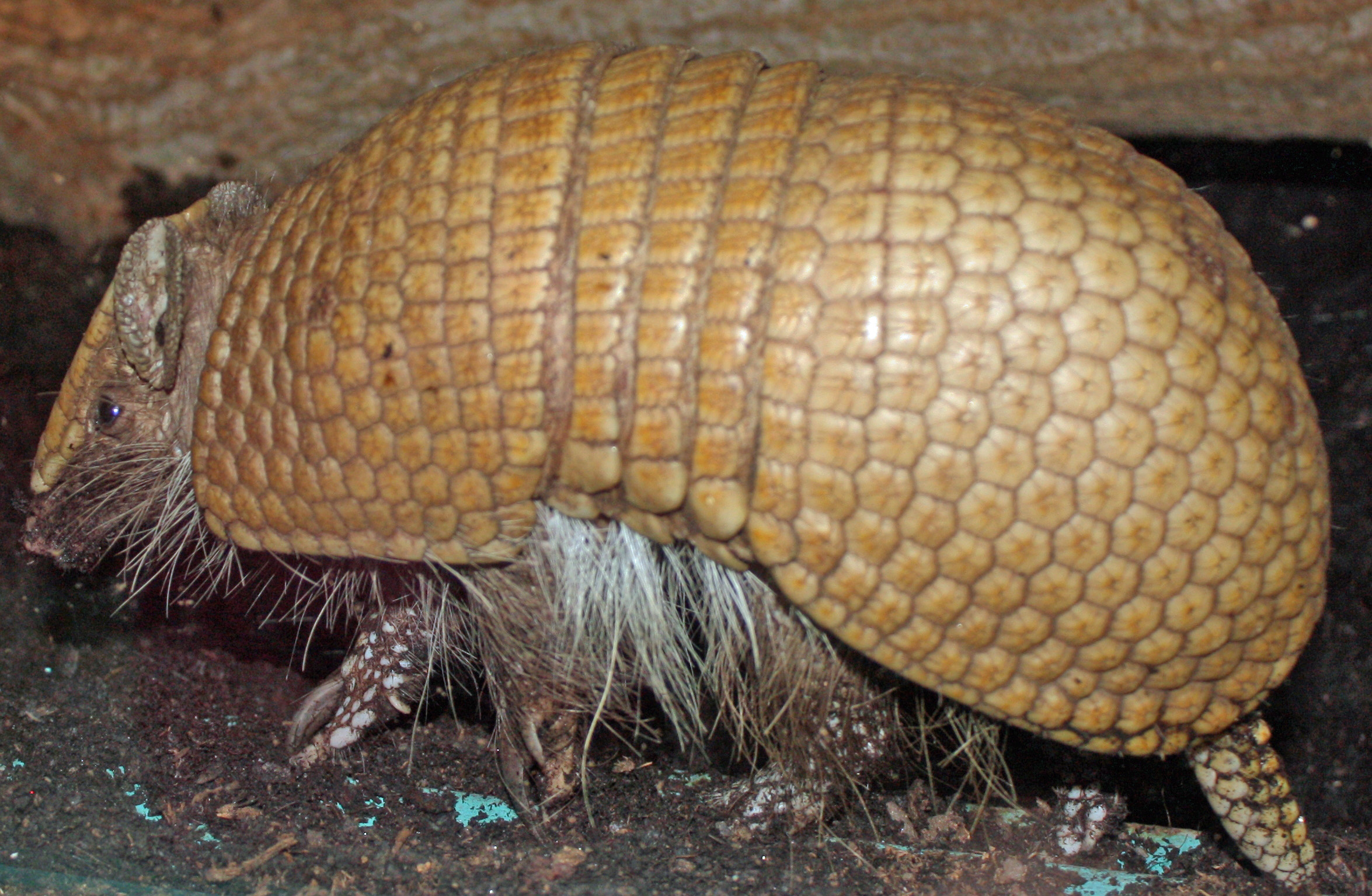
- Southern three-banded armadillo

Scientific classification
- Kingdom: Animalia
- Phylum: Chordata
- Class: Mammalia
- Order: Cingulata
- Family: Chlamyphoridae
- Subfamily: Tolypeutinae
- Genus: Tolypeutes; Illiger, 1811

Type species
- Tolypeutes tricinctus Linnaeus, 1758

Species
- See text
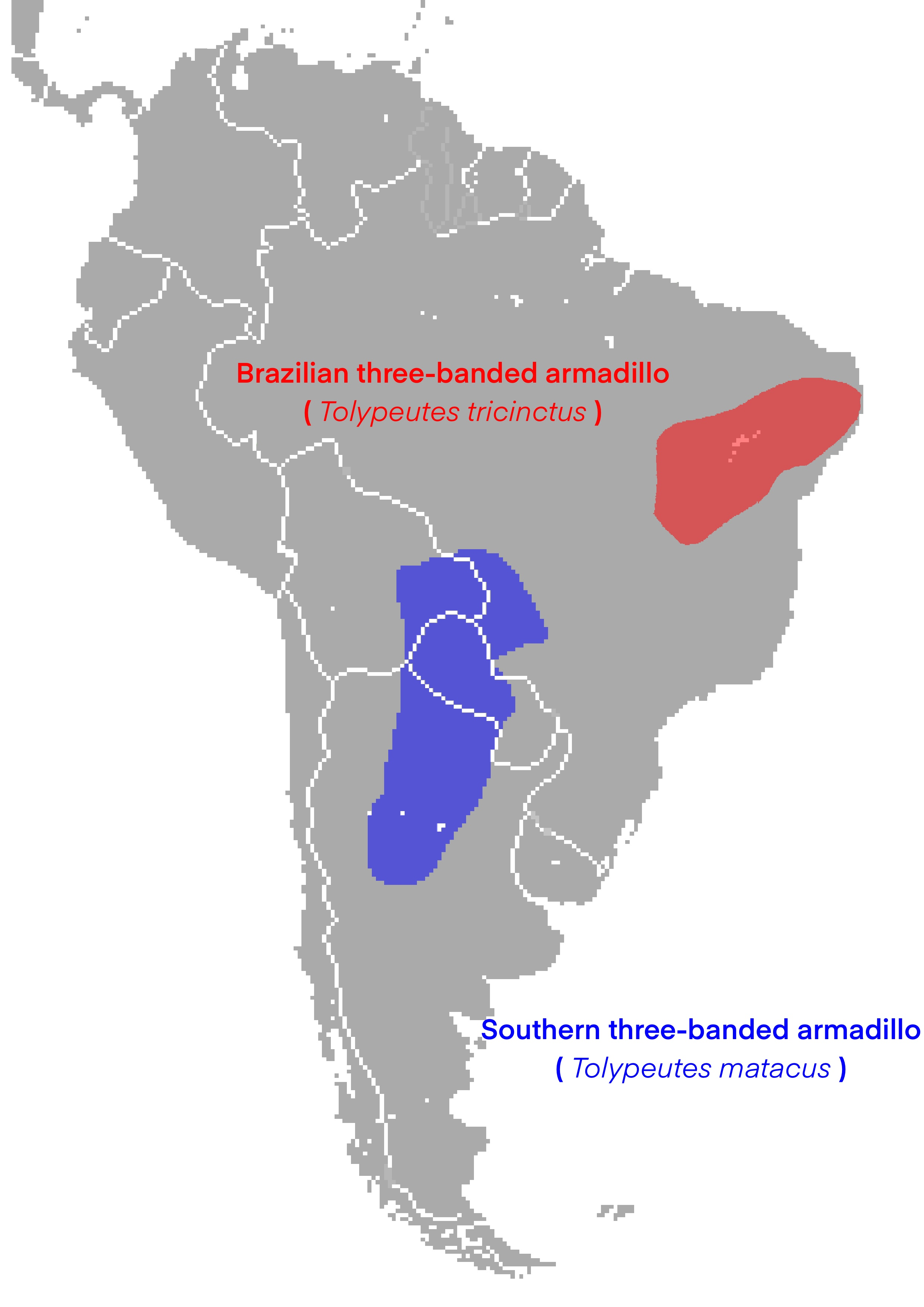

= Tolypeutes =

Genus of mammals belonging to the armadillo order of xenarthrans

The genus Tolypeutes contains the two species of three-banded armadillos. They are restricted to open and semi-open habitats in South America.

Of the several armadillo genera, only Tolypeutes rely heavily on their armor for protection. When threatened by a predator, Tolypeutes species frequently roll up into a ball. Other armadillo species cannot roll up because they have too many plates. This species is endangered due to hunting and deforestation of its native Brazilian habitat. They lack the ability to dig burrows like their competitors, instead relying on abandoned ones. Deforestation is a critical concern because it reduces available burrows, leaving them exposed to predators and human activity.

== Species ==
There are two recognized species:

Image	Scientific name	Common name	Distribution
	Tolypeutes matacus (Desmarest, 1804)	Southern three-banded armadillo	northern Argentina, southwestern Brazil, Paraguay and Bolivia
	Tolypeutes tricinctus (Linnaeus, 1758)	Brazilian three-banded armadillo	Brazil
