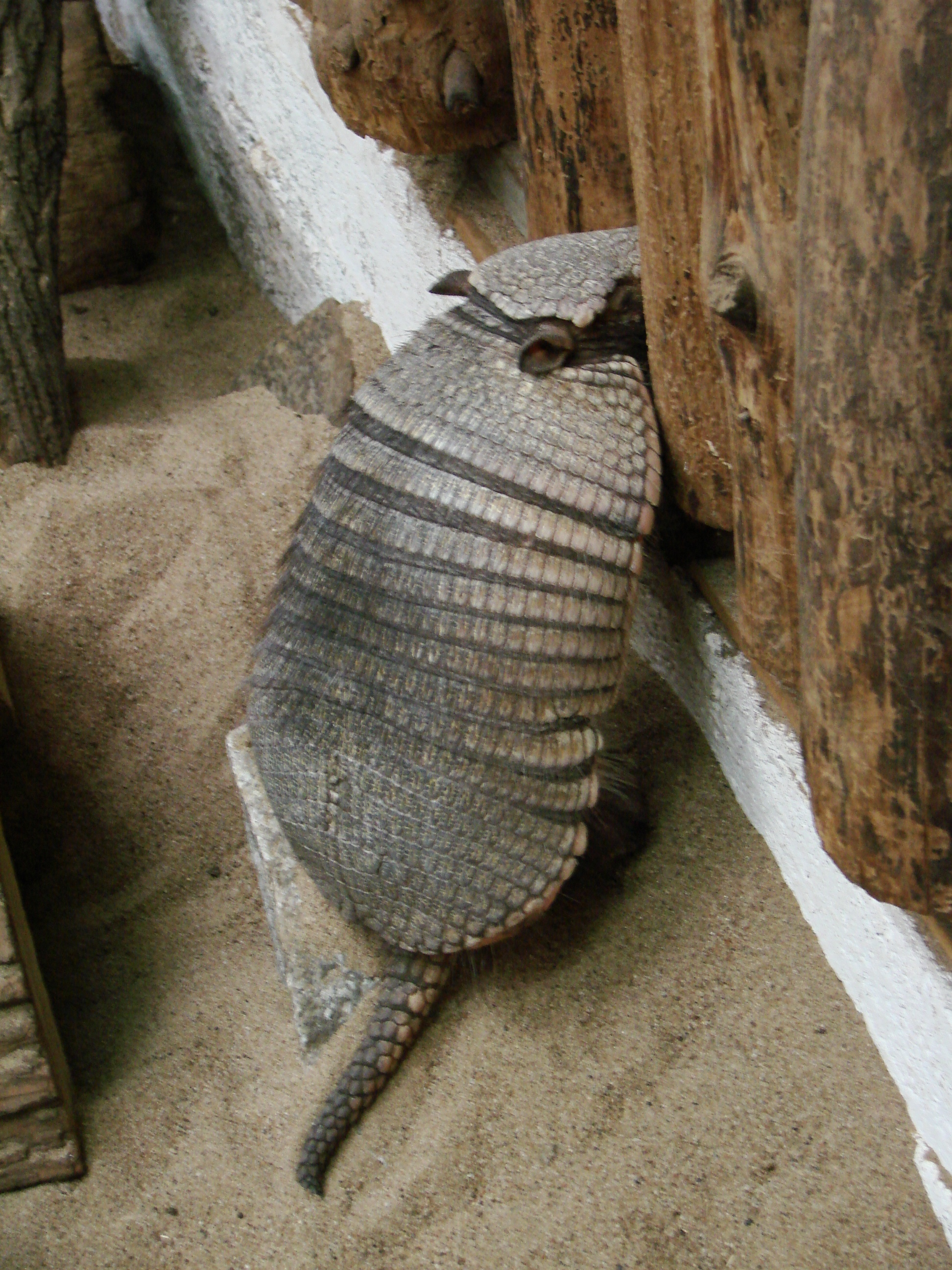
- At Wrocław Zoo, Poland

Conservation status
- Least Concern (IUCN 3.1)

Scientific classification
- Kingdom: Animalia
- Phylum: Chordata
- Class: Mammalia
- Order: Cingulata
- Family: Chlamyphoridae
- Genus: Chaetophractus
- Species: C. villosus

Binomial name
- Chaetophractus villosus (Desmarest, 1804)
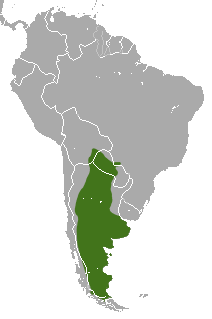
- Big hairy armadillo range

= Big hairy armadillo =

Species of mammal

The big (or large) hairy armadillo (Chaetophractus villosus) is one of the largest and most numerous armadillos in South America. It lives from sea level to altitudes of up to 1,300 meters across the southern portion of South America, and can be found in grasslands, forests, and savannahs, and has even started claiming agricultural areas as its home. It is an accomplished digger and spends most of its time below ground. It makes both temporary and long-term burrows, depending on its food source. In Spanish it is colloquially known as peludo.

Armadillos are protected from predators by a series of thin, bony plates along the head and back. They reach sexual maturity at around 9 months and have been known to live over 30 years in captivity. Though this animal is routinely harvested for its meat and its shell, or simply killed by farmers, it has shown resiliency, and populations seem to be handling this exploitation well. Currently, no protective practices are in place for this armadillo, but it does live in many protected areas. This species of armadillo is a preferred research animal due to its adaptability to laboratory settings, and relative hardiness in situations of stress.

== Description and taxonomy ==
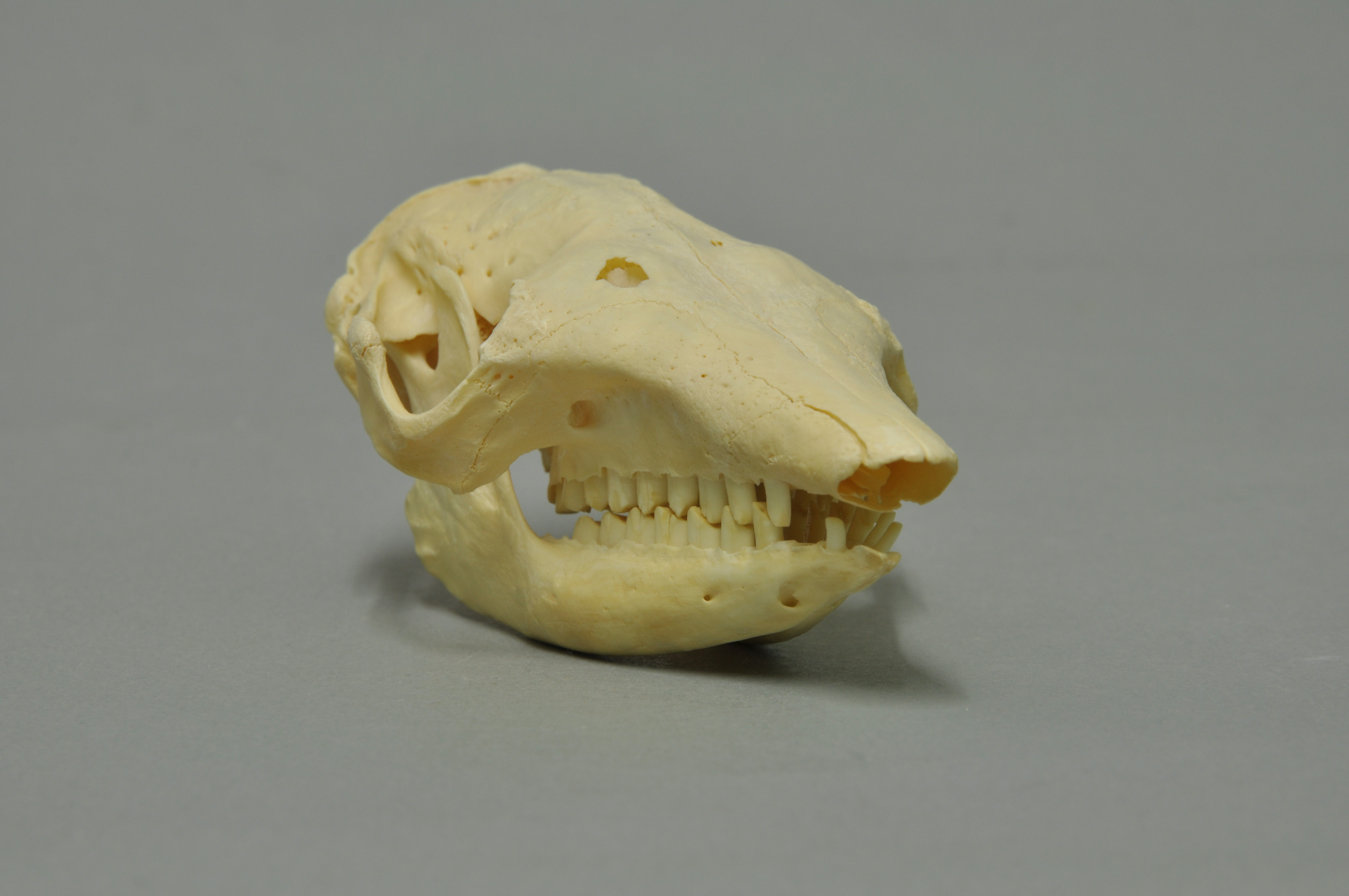
Skull of a big hairy armadillo

Chaetophractus villosus or the big hairy armadillo is the most abundant species of armadillo in Argentina. The armadillo's head and body are covered by protective bony plates, with its head plate being the most prominent. Along its back, flexible bands that encircle the torso allow flexibility in this otherwise stiff armor. The underside of this armadillo is densely covered in hair and this trait is how it got its common name. Long, coarse hairs also project from the bony plates, making this armadillo much hairier than other related species. The average individual grows from 26 to 34 cm (10 to 13 in) in body length, 22–40 cm (8.7–15.7 in) in extreme cases, and weighs 2 kg (4.4 lb), with a range of 1–3 kg (2.2–6.6 lb) by the time it reaches maturity. The tail measures 9 to 17 cm (3.5 to 6.7 in) long. Powerful front claws are used for both foraging and avoiding predators. The armadillo can use specially evolved membranes in its nose adaptively trap nostril soil and breath through it while digging.

The genus Chaetophractus consists of two or three species: C. vellerosus (the screaming hairy armadillo), C. nationi (the Andean hairy armadillo, which may actually be a population of C. vellerosus), and C. villosus. These species are recognized by the large amount of hair that extends all over their bodies, but especially on their undersides. The skulls follow the same patterns as other dasypodids, but females exhibit longer bones in the rostrocaudal plane, which is one of the key characteristics that shows the sexual dimorphism of these species. Not much is known about the cranial morphology of these species, especially bone descriptions. More research is being done to better describe these species and the skeletal differences between them. For now, body size, habitat, and behaviors are the best way to discern the differences.

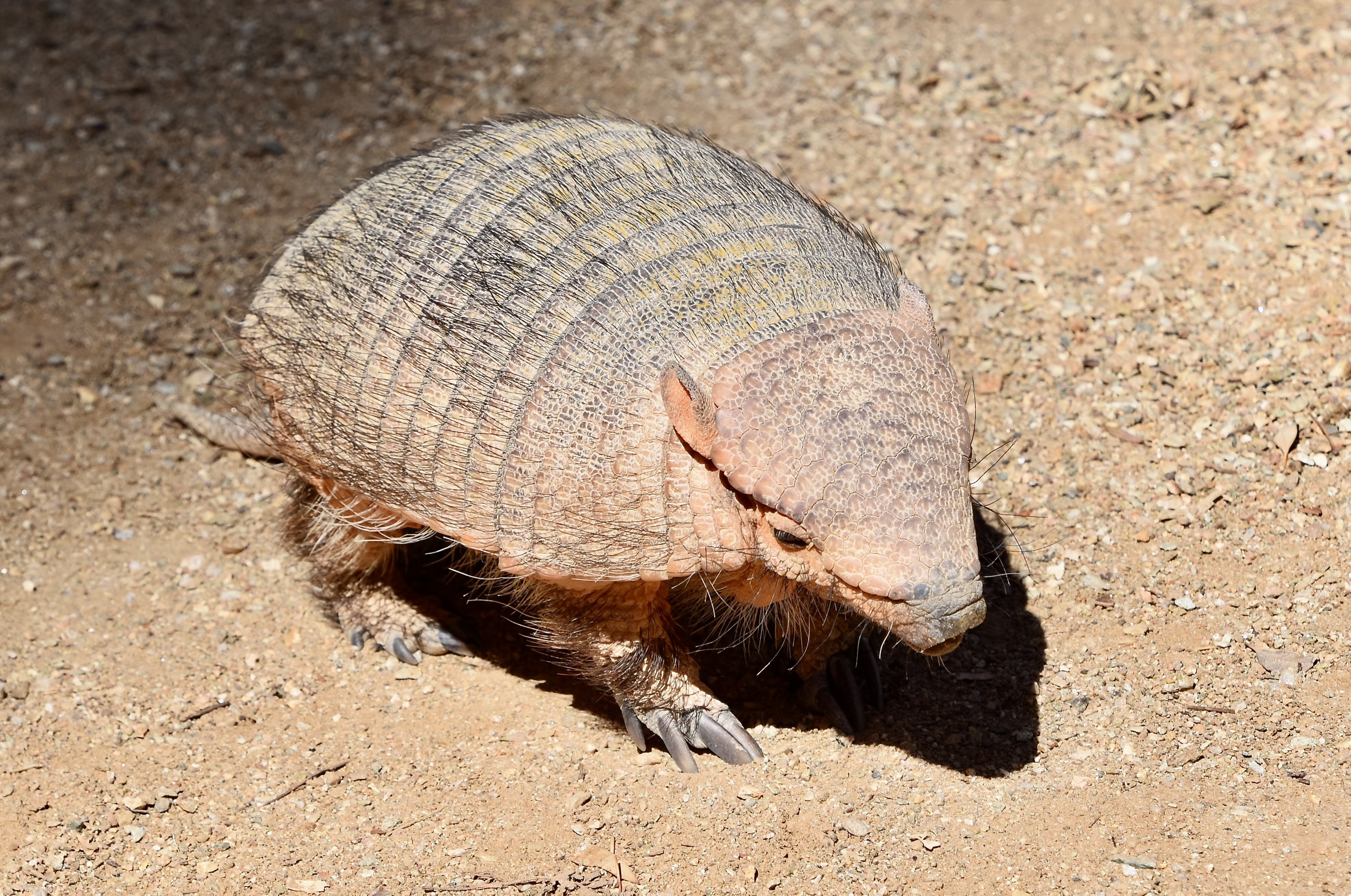
A big hairy armadillo at Wildlife World Zoo

== Diagnosis ==
When trying to determine the differences between these species, a few noticeable traits stand out. The first difference is size; C. villosus is the larger species. It can grow to a length of 34 cm (13 in). C. vellerosus is much smaller, being able to fit in the palm of a hand when fully grown, usually weighing only a kilogram. Both species are covered with much more hair than any other armadillos, mostly sprouting from its underside or between the bony plates along its back. When C. villosus is sexually aroused with an erect penis, species determination is easier. Its penis can be as long as 35 mm, and usually remains completely withdrawn inside a skin receptacle. The lesser hairy armadillo can usually be found in higher altitudes because its smaller size and slower metabolic rate helps it survive in areas with less food.

== Fossil record ==
The presence of a carapace containing osteoderms is one of the very distinctive features of armadillos, and is true for fossil taxa as well. These elements are evident frequently in the paleontological record due to their resilience. Three distinct areas are recognized in these hardened plates. The outer and inner parts are made of thin, compact bone, while the middle zone is thicker and contains tissues for hair follicles and sweat glands. The presence of red bone marrow is rare in members of Chaetophractus, but widespread in Dasypus novemcinctus osteoderms. These findings propose an early split of both subfamilies and maintain the hypothesis that the Euphractinae are more derived than the Dasypodinae.

C. villosus earliest known fossils were found in the Pampean region, which suggests this is where the species originated. Fossil records then indicate the migration into Patagonia as the main dispersal route, which most likely occurred after the Pleistocenic glaciations. Using molecular dating, scientists estimated the first armadillos emerged around the Cretaceous/Tertiary boundary. This was followed by the divergence of anteaters and sloths in the Early Eocene era.

== Geographic distribution ==
The C. villosus home range encompasses a contigous area spanning large swathes of Argentina, Bolivia and Paraguay. In Argentina its natural range extends beyond the Pampas as far south as Santa Cruz Province in southern Patagonia. It was introduced to Tierra del Fuego Island in 1982, spreading from a property northeast of Río Grande. The introduced individuals were originally from Buenos Aires Province and have adapted well despite Río Grande having a mean annual temperature 2 to 3 °C lower than Río Gallegos next to the southern limit of the natural distribution of C. villosus.

== Ecology ==
Members of Chlamyphoridae, including C. villosus, have evolved specific traits to help them survive. The most recognizable of these are the bony plates that cover the armadillos' heads and backs. These protective plates allow the animal a fair measure of protection against its natural predators. This species also has a remarkable respiratory adaptation when the nostrils are completely covered in soil. It is able to maintain sufficient respiratory movements due to a mechanism that allows it to use air that fills the space between soil particles, without inhaling the particles themselves. This, along with its powerful digging claws and high surface-area-to-mass ratio, contributes to this fossorial, or subterranean, lifestyle. Even with the added challenge of burrowing, this armadillo maintains similar ratios as nonfossorial species and suggests it has adapted to a burrowing lifestyle as a way to avoid extreme temperatures and predators, rather than any help it could receive from foraging.

Little is known about the hemostasis of this species. Platelet counts are similar between sexes and they seem to remain similar even when in captivity. They are comparable to most other mammals and react in the same manner to proven agonists. More studies in this area could reveal biomedical advances, but little more is known now.

Scientists conducting studies on the C. villosus penis muscles revealed this species' very long penis exhibits variability. During its waking hours, it remains hidden beneath a skin receptacle, until it becomes erect and it projects outside in a rostral direction. During its slow wave sleep phase, penile protrusion makes some very complex movements. The penis during this phase is not erect, but remains outside of its receptacle. During paradoxical sleep, no erections occur, and the penile muscles share the characteristics of the rest of the body.

== Life history and behavior ==
Chaetophractus villosus spends most of its time burrowing in the ground and looking for insects or worms as its main foraging method. Its powerful front claws and snout allow it to rout through the sediment with relative ease. When the armadillo detects a predator, it will run to the nearest burrow and wedge itself in using its legs; only the bony plates are exposed to predators. When it cannot get to one of its burrows, it will lay down flat on the ground to better protect its softer underside.

Most of this armadillo's activity occurs starting at dusk and continues on into the night. It can be seen active in the day, however, when enough food cannot be found during the night. It uses its sense of smell to find prey, and shovels soil away to reach it. Most individuals breed in the late winter or spring, but in captivity they have been known to conceive year round. After a gestation period of 60 to 75 days, the female will usually give birth to a litter of one to two young which are suckled for another 50 to 80 days.

C. villosus seems to be able to burrow through most sediment, but tends to shy away from rockier terrains. They tend to burrow into the side of a hill rather than on flat ground. Their temporary burrows (in search of food or safety) are usually shallower and not as complex as their home burrows, which are usually much deeper and can be quite complex, with many escape tunnels and dens. The orientation of their burrows depends largely on the wind direction. This allows them to be well adapted to arid desert terrain.

== Conservation ==
C. villosus is rated as a least concern species, due to its large population and widespread habitat range. It also has a remarkable ability to adapt to many changing environments. It is considered a least concern species because it is not predicted to decrease into any of the threatened categories any time soon. In fact, the population seems to be increasing.
