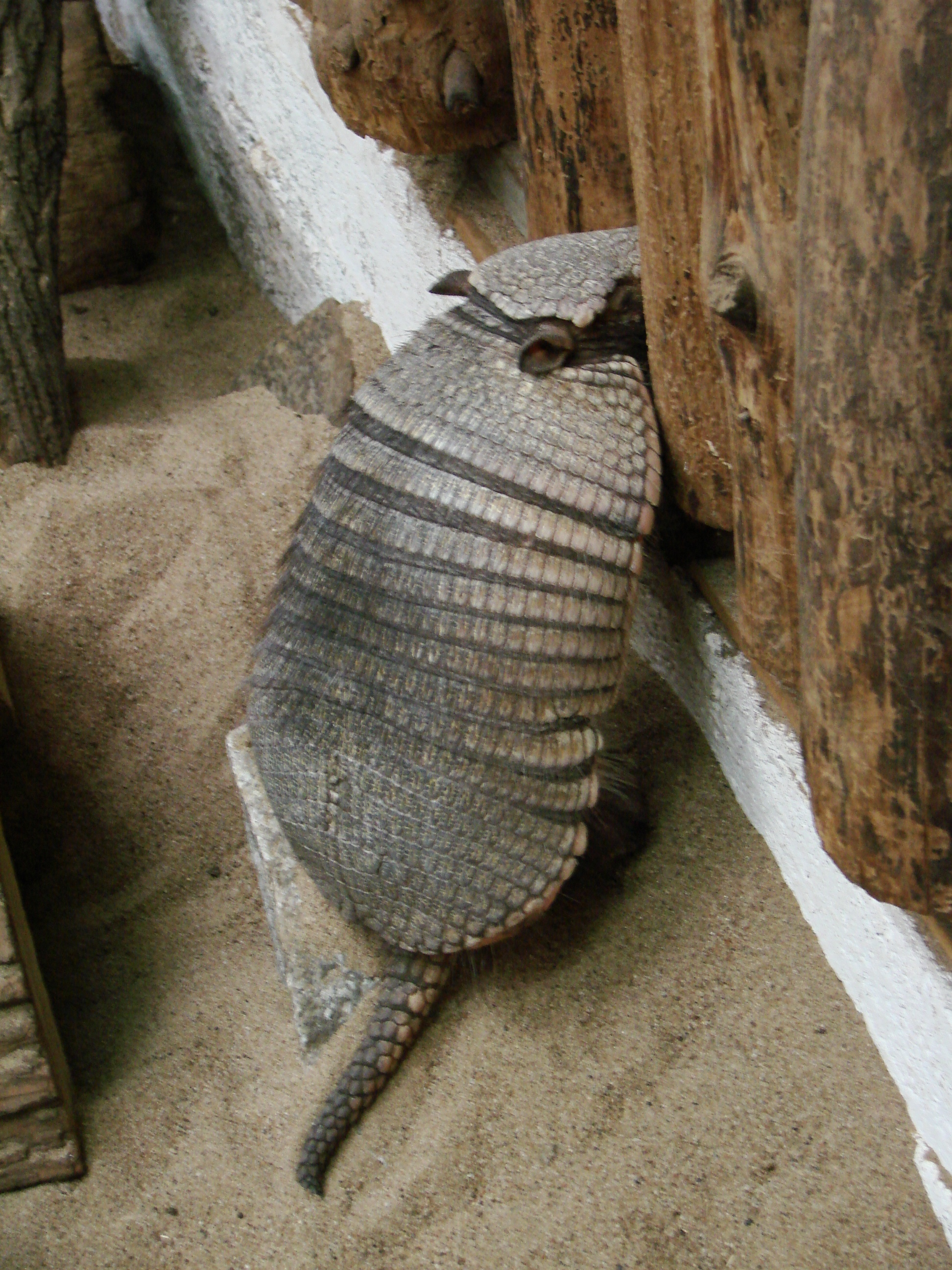
- Big hairy armadillo (C. villosus)

Scientific classification
- Kingdom: Animalia
- Phylum: Chordata
- Class: Mammalia
- Order: Cingulata
- Family: Chlamyphoridae
- Subfamily: Euphractinae
- Genus: Chaetophractus; Fitzinger, 1871

Type species
- Dasypus villosus Desmarest, 1804

Species
- C. vellerosus; C. villosus; C. nationi
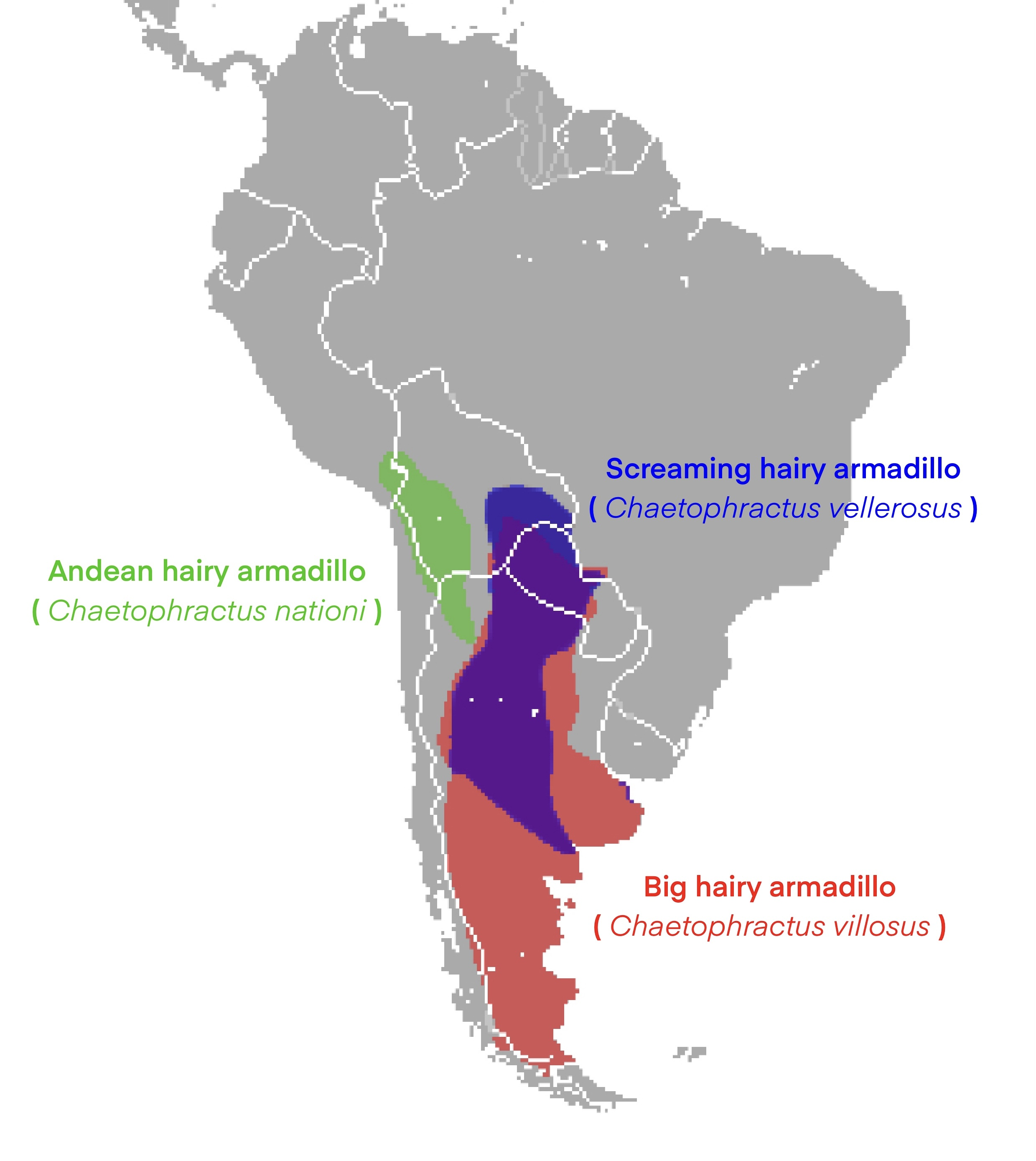

= Chaetophractus =

Genus of mammals belonging to the armadillo order

Chaetophractus is a small genus of armadillos in the family Chlamyphoridae. It contains the following three species:

Image	Scientific name	Common name	Distribution
	Chaetophractus vellerosus	Screaming hairy armadillo	Central and southern parts of South America
	Chaetophractus villosus	Big hairy armadillo	The Pampas and Patagonia as far south as Santa Cruz, Argentina and Magallanes, Chile
	Chaetophractus nationi	Andean hairy armadillo	Bolivia, in the region of the Puna; the departments of Oruro, La Paz, and Cochabamba, Bolivia and northern Chile

Members of the genus are endemic to the continent of South America. They are found in the central and southern countries such as Argentina, Bolivia, Chile, and Paraguay.

Chaetophractus vellerosus typically digs burrows in area of native woodlands and calcareous soils. These burrows vary in direction or depth, and individuals do not use to the same burrow once they leave it.

Chaetophractus nationi is probably a junior synonym of Chaetophractus vellerosus and the genus Chatophractus may be paraphyletic.
