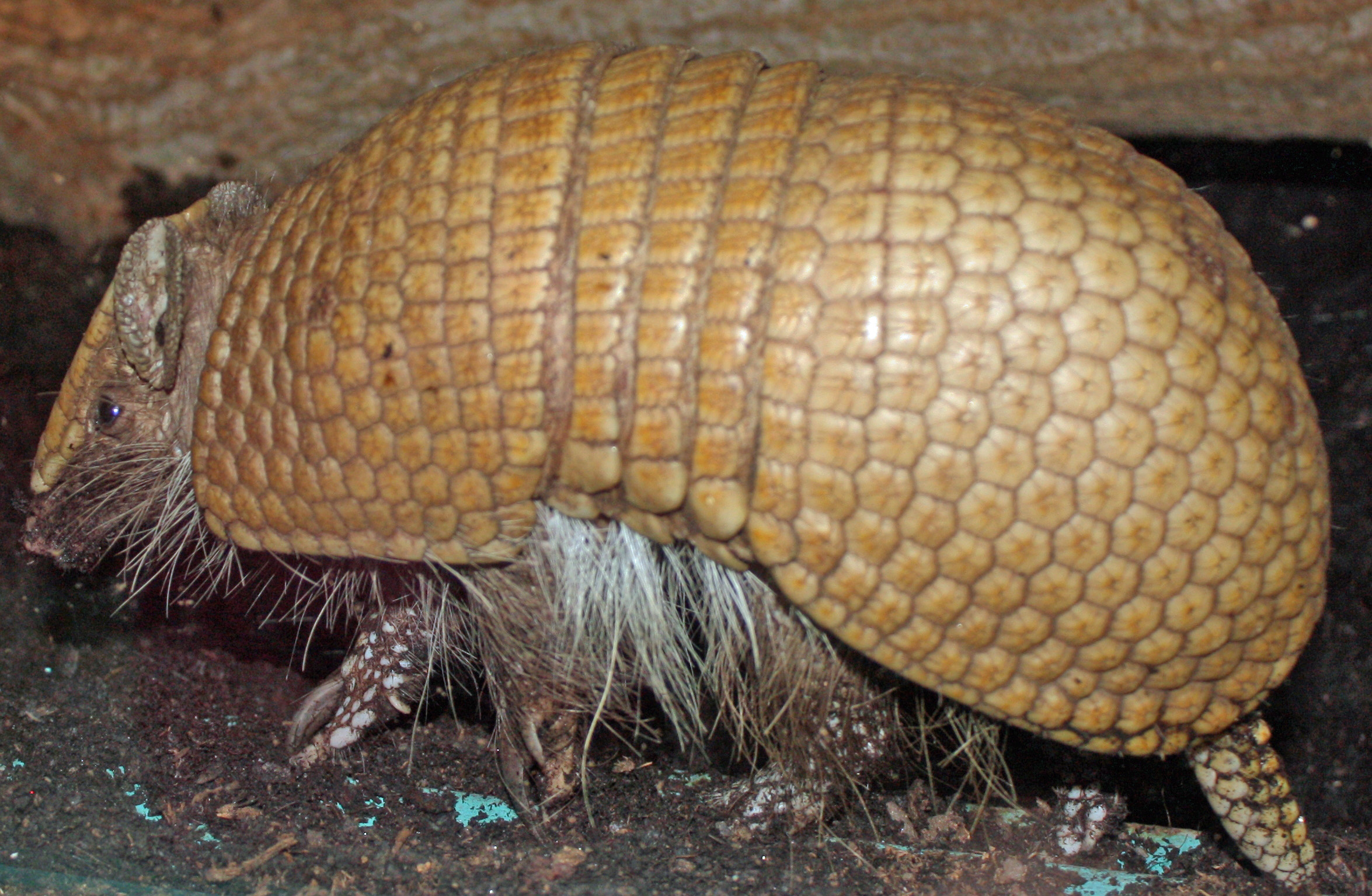
- Southern three-banded armadillo (Tolypeutes matacus)
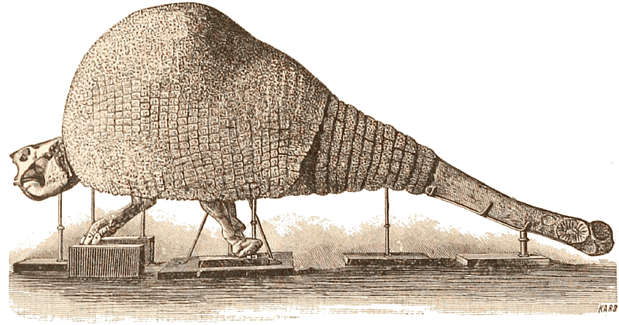
- Illustration of a skeleton of Doedicurus clavicaudatus

Scientific classification
- Kingdom: Animalia
- Phylum: Chordata
- Class: Mammalia
- Order: Cingulata
- Family: Chlamyphoridae; Bonaparte, 1850

Type genus
- Chlamyphorus Harlan, 1825

Subfamilies
- Chlamyphorinae; Euphractinae; †Glyptodontinae; †Pampatheriinae; Tolypeutinae
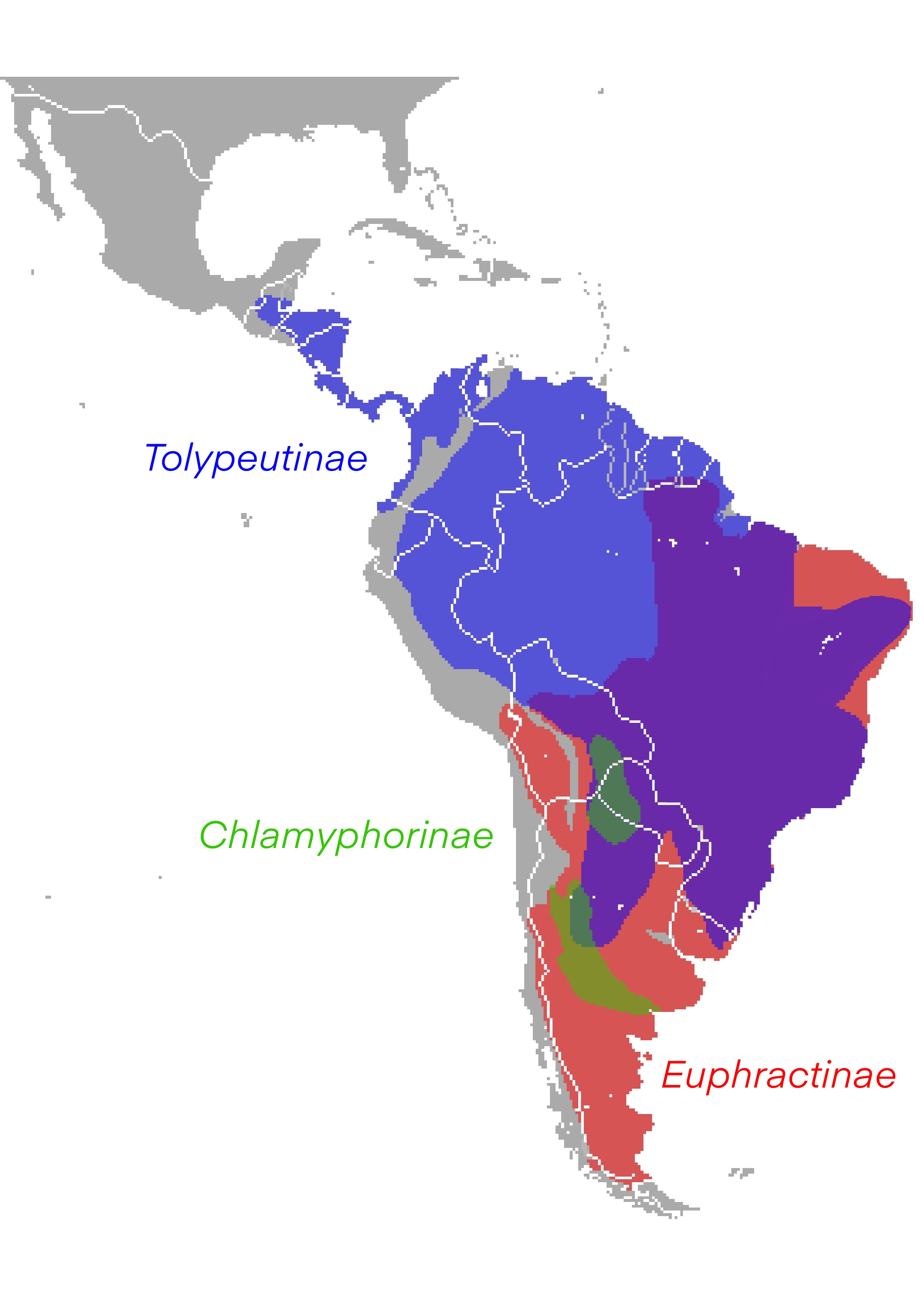

= Chlamyphoridae =

Chlamyphoridae Temporal range: Middle Eocene to present

Family of armadillos

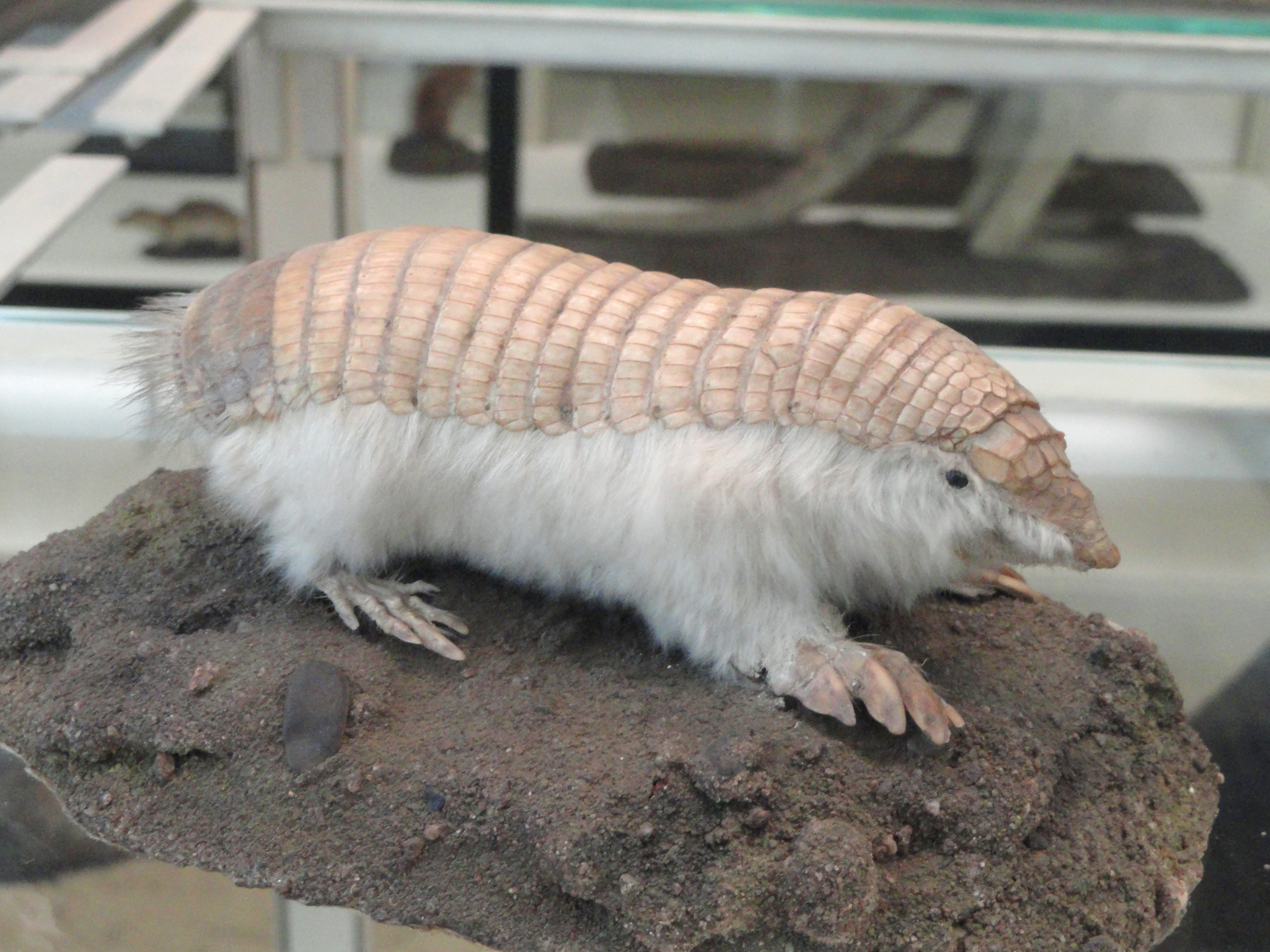
Taxidermied pink fairy armadillo (Chlamyphorus truncatus)

Chlamyphoridae is a family of cingulate mammals. While glyptodonts have traditionally been considered stem-group cingulates outside the group that contains modern armadillos, there had been speculation that the extant family Dasypodidae could be paraphyletic based on morphological evidence. In 2016, an analysis of Doedicurus mtDNA found it was, in fact, nested within the modern armadillos as the sister group of a clade consisting of Chlamyphorinae and Tolypeutinae. For this reason, all extant armadillos but Dasypus were relocated to a new family. The genus name comes from Ancient Greek χλαμύς (khlamús), meaning "cloak", and φόρος (phóros), "bearing".

== Classification ==
Below is a taxonomy of the extant species of armadillos in this family.

Family Chlamyphoridae

- Subfamily Chlamyphorinae
  - Genus Calyptophractus
    - Greater fairy armadillo, Calyptophractus retusus
  - Genus Chlamyphorus
    - Pink fairy armadillo, Chlamyphorus truncatus
- Subfamily Euphractinae
  - Genus Euphractus
    - Six-banded armadillo, Euphractus sexcinctus
  - Genus Zaedyus
    - Pichi, Zaedyus pichiy
  - Genus Chaetophractus
    - Screaming hairy armadillo, Chaetophractus vellerosus
    - Big hairy armadillo, Chaetophractus villosus
    - Andean hairy armadillo, Chaetophractus nationi
- Subfamily Tolypeutinae
  - Genus Cabassous
    - Greater naked-tailed armadillo, Cabassous tatouay
    - Chacoan naked-tailed armadillo, Cabassous chacoensis
    - Northern naked-tailed armadillo, Cabassous centralis
    - Southern naked-tailed armadillo, Cabassous unicinctus
  - Genus Priodontes
    - Giant armadillo, Priodontes maximus
  - Genus Tolypeutes
    - Southern three-banded armadillo, Tolypeutes matacus
    - Brazilian three-banded armadillo, Tolypeutes tricinctus

== Phylogeny ==
Chlamyphoridae, like Dasypodidae, is a basal clade within Cingulata, as shown below.

Cingulata cladogram

- Cingulata
  - Chlamyphoridae
    - Euphractinae
      - - Euphractus
          - E. sexcinctus
      - - Zaedyus
          - Z. pichiy
        - Chaetophractus
          - C. villosus
          - - C. nationi
            - C. vellerosus
    - - - †Glyptodontinae
          - - †Doedicurus
              †D. clavicaudatus
          - †(31 other extinct genera)
      - - Chlamyphorinae
          - Chlamyphorus truncatus
          - Calyptophractus retusus
        - Tolypeutinae
          - - Priodontes
              P. maximus
          - - Tolypeutes
              - T. tricinctus
              - T. matacus
            - Cabassous
              - - C. tatouay
              - - C. chacoensis
                - - C. centralis
                  - C. unicinctus
  - Dasypodidae
    - - - Dasypus
          (7 living species)
      - †(26 extinct genera)
