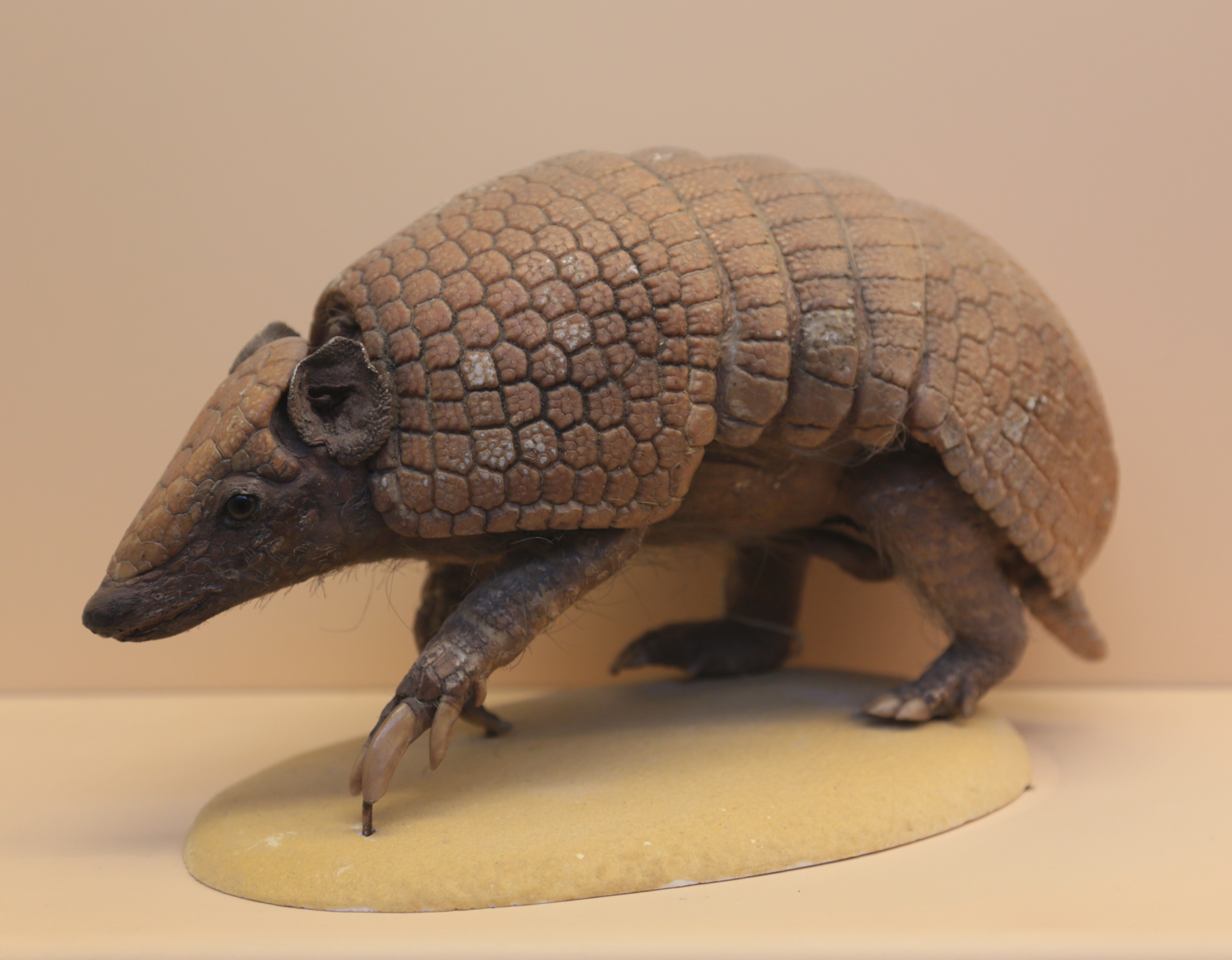

Conservation status
- Vulnerable (IUCN 3.1)

Scientific classification
- Kingdom: Animalia
- Phylum: Chordata
- Class: Mammalia
- Order: Cingulata
- Family: Chlamyphoridae
- Genus: Tolypeutes
- Species: T. tricinctus

Binomial name
- Tolypeutes tricinctus (Linnaeus, 1758)
- Brazilian three-banded armadillo range

Synonyms
- Dasypus tricinctus Linnaeus, 1758; Dasypus quadricinctus Linnaeus, 1758

= Brazilian three-banded armadillo =

Species of mammals

The Brazilian three-banded armadillo (Tolypeutes tricinctus) is an armadillo species endemic to eastern Brazil, where it is known as tatu-bola (Portuguese pronunciation: [tɐˈtu ˈbɔlɐ], lit. ball armadillo). It is one of only two species of armadillo that can roll into a ball (the other is the southern three-banded armadillo).

== Names ==
It was known as kwaráu in the extinct Huamoé language of the Serra Negra in Pernambuco State, Brazil, and as ˈkʌ̨́ñíkį̀ in the extinct Kambiwá language of Barreira, Petrolândia, Pernambuco.

== Anatomy ==
Brazilian three-banded armadillos have a head-and-body length of about 22 to 27 cm (8.7 to 10.6 in) and the tail is between 6 and 8 cm (2.4 and 3.1 in) long. They weigh 1–1.6 kg (2.2–3.5 lb). The armor is composed of ossified dermal scutes covered by nonoverlapping, keratinized epidermal scales, which are connected by flexible bands of skin. This armor covers the back, sides, head, tail, ears, and outside surfaces of the legs. The underside of the body and the inner surfaces of the legs have no armored protection, and are covered instead by long, coarse hair. The genus Tolypeutes, which includes both the Brazilian and southern species of three-banded armadillos, is unique in the ability to roll up in a tight, almost impenetrable ball. This is because their armor is slightly looser than that of other armadillo genera, which allows for greater freedom of movement. The loose armor also creates a layer of air between the shell and the body, which insulates the animal. This higher capacity for thermoregulation allows them to survive in climates too arid for some of the other armadillo species. When the armadillo rolls into a defensive ball, the ears are tucked into the shell and the head and tail interlock to seal the shell completely. The teeth are soft and peg-like, adapted solely for smashing the exoskeletons of insects.

== Ecology ==
=== Range and habitat ===
As its name suggests, the Brazilian three-banded armadillo is indigenous to Brazil, living primarily in the northeastern part of the country, just south of the equator. They are rarely seen west of 50°W longitude. The Brazilian three-banded armadillo lives primarily in open savannahs (Cerrado) and dry woodlands (Caatinga), where low rainfall and poor soil limit the vegetation to tall, woody grasses, scattered bushes, and gnarled trees. There is an abundance of cactus-like plants in the northern reaches of its range. The Brazilian three-banded armadillo builds its own burrows for shelter and survival but takes advantage of reusing existing burrows in its environment.

=== Diet ===
The main staples of its diet are ants and termites, which it can smell through up to 20 cm (8 in) of soil. It finds food by shuffling slowly along with its nose to the ground. When it detects prey, it frantically digs a hole and thrust its nose into it, using its long, sticky tongue to lap up any insects it may find. Other foods include mollusks, worms, fruit, and carrion.

== Behavior ==
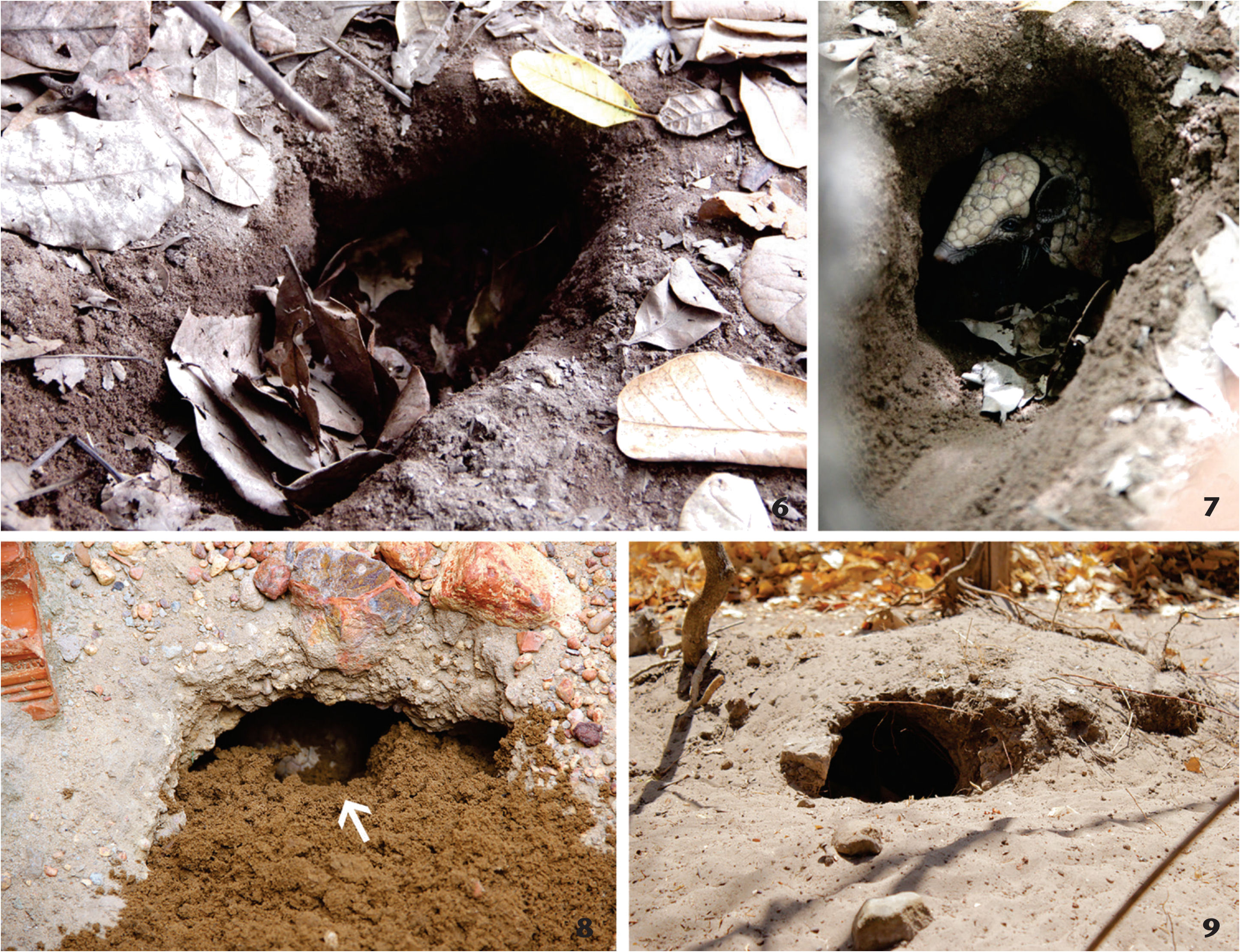
The burrows of Brazilian three-banded armadillo

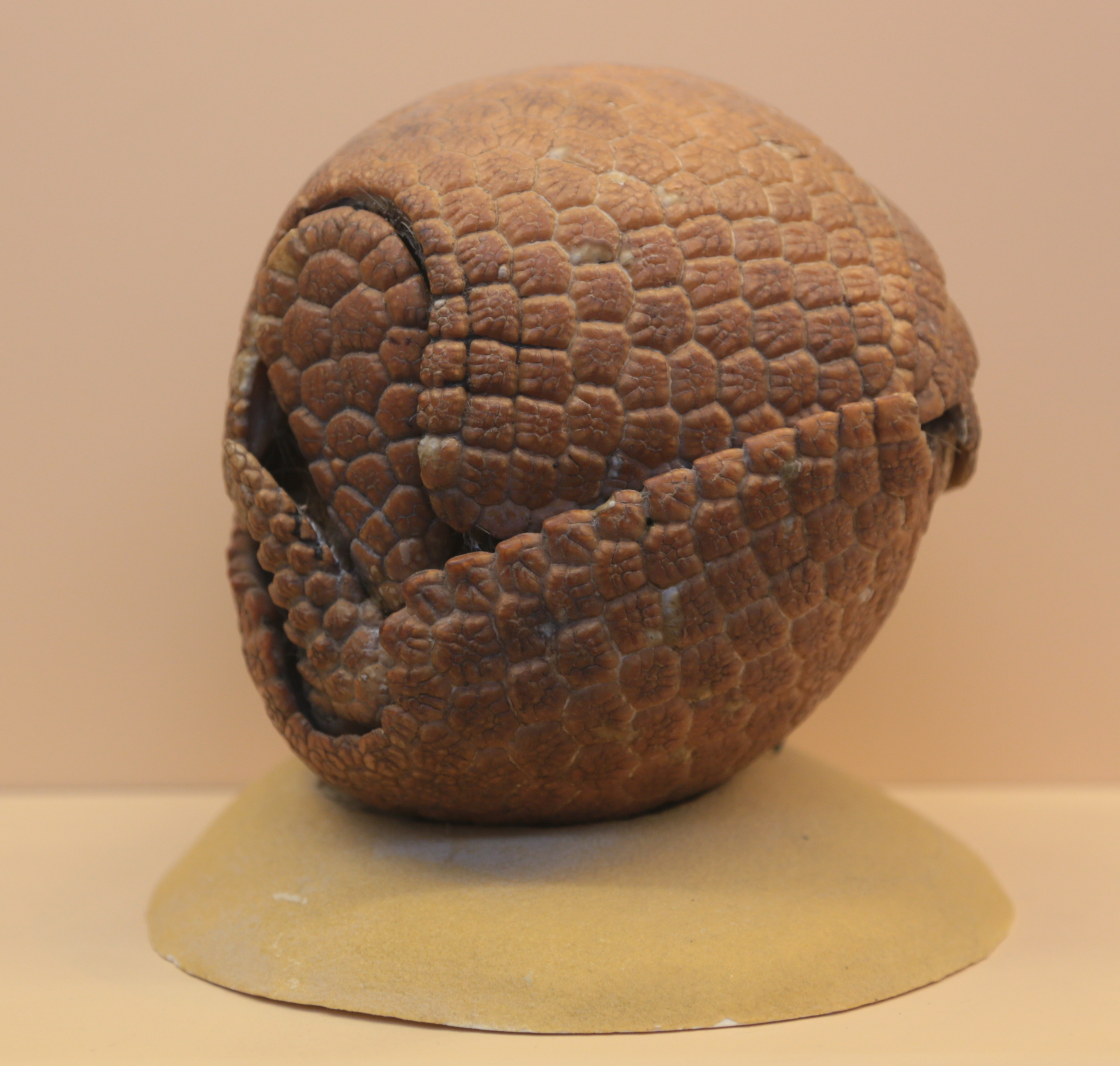
Tolypeutes tricinctus rolled into a defensive ball

Armadillos are chiefly solitary, but this species will occasionally travel in small family groups of up to three members. They are largely nocturnal, but have been known to forage during the day. All the armadillos are spectacular diggers, but unlike most of the other species, three-banded armadillos do not dig in defense or to find shelter. They prefer to rest under bushes, rather than dig burrows, and their ability to roll into a ball makes defensive digging unnecessary. When they are not foraging, they move with a sort of trot, bouncing on the tips of their front toes, while their hind feet slap flatly on the ground. They mark their territories with secretions from glands on their face, feet, and rump. When threatened, they occasionally do not seal their armor completely, but wait until they are touched. They then quickly snap shut in an effort to startle the predator.

=== Reproduction ===
The mating season lasts from October to January, during which there is a brief courtship before mating. The female carries the young for a gestation period of 120 days at the end of which single, blind offspring is born. The newborn’s armor is soft, but its claws are fully developed, and it can walk and roll into a ball within hours of birth. The armor hardens by the third or fourth week, around the same time the eyes and earflaps open. The young armadillo is weaned at 10 weeks and reaches sexual maturity at 9–12 months.

== Threats ==
The defense system of the Brazilian three-banded armadillo makes it safe from the majority of predators such as Ocelots. Adult pumas and jaguars are the only South American mammals powerful enough to be a natural threat. The real danger to armadillos is the destruction of their habitats to make room for livestock. In addition to this, this species is facing a dual threat of heavy hunting pressure and habitat loss. Due to its tendency to ball up when threatened, this species is frequently collected for food, which has resulted in significant population declines across its range. Additionally, growing agriculture, mining, and charcoal collecting have devastated and damaged its habitat.

== 2014 FIFA World Cup mascot ==
The Caatinga Association, a Brazilian environmental NGO, launched in January 2012 a national campaign proposing the three-banded armadillo to become mascot of the 2014 FIFA World Cup hosted by Brazil. In March 2012, the Brazilian weekly, Veja, reported the three-banded armadillo would be the official mascot for the FIFA World Cup. Official announcement came in September 2012.
