= Northern naked-tailed armadillo =

- Near Guápiles, Costa Rica

Conservation status
- Least Concern (IUCN 3.1)

Scientific classification
- Kingdom: Animalia
- Phylum: Chordata
- Class: Mammalia
- Order: Cingulata
- Family: Chlamyphoridae
- Genus: Cabassous
- Species: C. centralis

Binomial name
- Cabassous centralis (Miller, 1899)
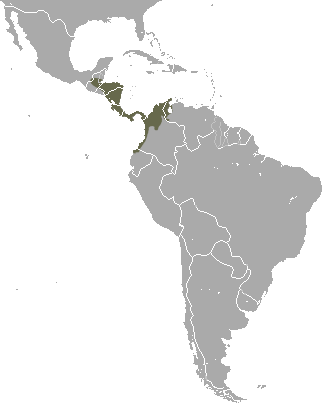
- Northern naked-tailed armadillo range

Species of mammal

The northern naked-tailed armadillo (Cabassous centralis) is a species of armadillo. It is one of only two species of armadillo found outside of South America, the other being the more widely distributed nine-banded armadillo.

== Description ==
The northern naked-tailed armadillo is relatively small for an armadillo, with adults measuring 31 to 42 cm (12 to 17 in) in length, with an 11 to 18 cm (4.3 to 7.1 in) tail, and weighing from 2 to 3.5 kg (4.4 to 7.7 lb). They have a short, broad snout, large, funnel-shaped ears, and small eyes. Unlike other armadillos with which they might be confused, they have no scales on the backs of their ears.

The upper body is covered in multiple, squarish scutes, that are arranged in ten to thirteen bands which allow the animal some flexibility. Compared with some other armadillo species, the bands are indistinct. The carapace is generally dark grey-brown in color, with a yellowish tinge to the lower margin. The tail has thinner plates, which are more widely spaced, and somewhat pinkish. The underside of the animal has numerous tufts of hair arranged in about twenty regular bands. The forefeet have five claws, with the middle claw being greatly enlarged into a sickle shape. They have been described as possessing a pungent, musky odor.

== Distribution and habitat ==
It is found from Chiapas in southern Mexico to western Colombia, northwestern Ecuador and northwestern Venezuela, at altitudes from sea level to 3000 m. Its habitats include tropical dry forest, moderately moist forest, cloud forest and forest edges, including secondary and agriculturally disturbed forest, as well as in dry savanna and Colombian sub-páramo. However, it appears to prefer undisturbed primary forest, and thus may be vulnerable to deforestation and other forms of habitat disturbance. There are no recognised subspecies.

== Behaviour and diet ==
This armadillo is seldom sighted, and may be rare and/or patchily distributed. It is a solitary insectivore, feeding mainly on ants and termites. One of the most fossorial of all armadillos, it spends most of its time underground in tunnels. Unusually, it rotates its body like an auger as it digs, using the large claws on its fore-feet. It has been reported to make low growling sounds and gurgling squeals, doing so loudly when it is captured, as well as urinating and defecating to discourage its captor.

Mothers give birth to only a single young at a time. Newborns are blind, deaf, and hairless, with soft, pink skin, although the scutes are already visible. They have been reported to live for over seven years.
