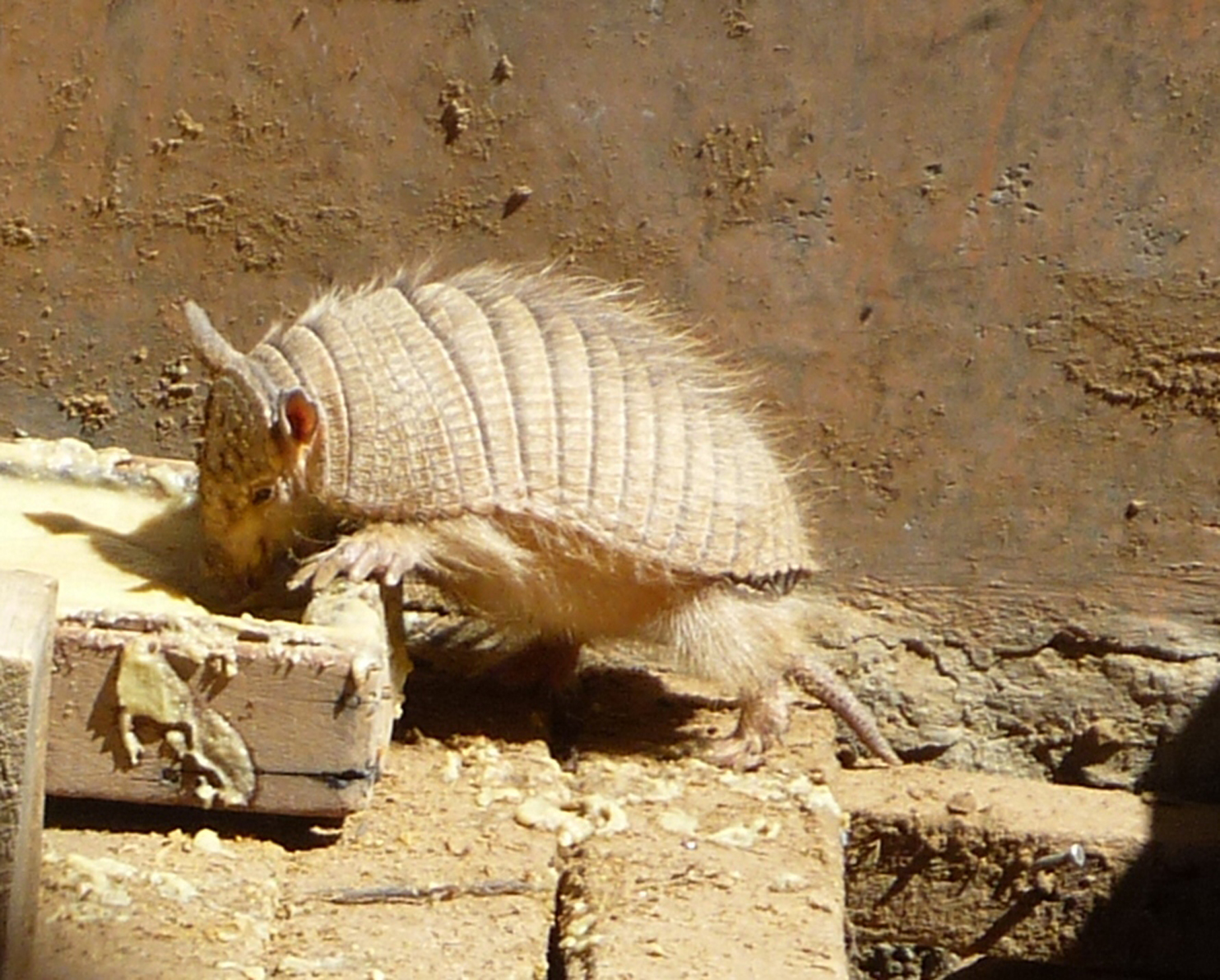
- Near Oruro, Bolivia

Conservation status
- Least Concern (IUCN 3.1)
- CITES Appendix II (Note: Although listed in Appendix II, the CITES Conference of Parties have agreed to deem the species as Appendix I)

Scientific classification
- Kingdom: Animalia
- Phylum: Chordata
- Class: Mammalia
- Order: Cingulata
- Family: Chlamyphoridae
- Genus: Chaetophractus
- Species: C. nationi

Binomial name
- Chaetophractus nationi (Thomas, 1894)
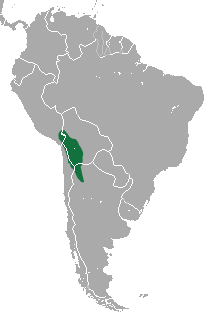
- Andean hairy armadillo range

= Andean hairy armadillo =

Species of mammal

The Andean hairy armadillo (Chaetophractus nationi) is an armadillo found mainly in Bolivia, in the region of the Puna; the departments of Oruro, La Paz, and Cochabamba (Gardner, 1993). Nowark (1991) describes it as distributed in Bolivia and northern Chile. A recent publication of Pacheco (1995) also locates the species in the Puno Region of Peru. This species is also thought to be present in northern Argentina. However, this location may actually only contain a population of C. vellerosus.

== Physical description ==
The Andean hairy armadillo averages a tail length of three to seven inches and a body length of eight to sixteen inches. This armadillo is found to have eighteen dorsal bands, in which eight are considered movable. The Andean hairy armadillo gets its name because this armadillo has hair covering all of its ventral side and its legs as well. This species comes in a variety of colors ranging from light brown to yellow/beige. Their teeth are unique because they are continuously growing and do not contain enamel. Their average weight tends to be four and a half to five pounds. They maintain an internal temperature and use limb countercurrent exchange as well.

== Diet and activity ==
Andean hairy armadillos are considered omnivores because they eat a variety of foods. Their diet can consist of grains, roots, fruits and even small vertebrates. These armadillos have even been found to eat rotting flesh and the maggots found within the corpse. These mammals find their food by digging through leaves and substrates while using their nose to detect possible meals. They prefer open high-altitude grasslands to live in.

This armadillo finds shelter in tunnels and burrows that it digs itself using fore-claws. Their territories are about eight acres in size. The Andean hairy armadillo's sleep schedule depend on the season and temperature of its habitat. In the summer months they are considered nocturnality so they do not overheat. They then switch to diurnality during the winter season to stay warm. The Andean hairy armadillo communicates with other armadillos through the use of chemicals, as well as through touch.

== Reproduction ==
Male Andean hairy armadillos only pair up with a female during mating season. They are a polygynandrous species and each adult lives a solitary life. The male armadillo is known to have the longest penises, in proportion to the body size, of any mammal. Males are called lister and females are called zed. Mating season begins in the fall and young are usually born in the summertime with a total of only two offspring. Females are pregnant for only two months though. This two months pregnancy, but births in the summer is because the family Dasypodidae is known for their ability to have delayed implantation and all the embryos produced are from a single zygote. Embryos within the mother still produce their own placenta. Armadillo's offspring are referred to as pups and are born helpless. They remain with their mother fully dependent for fifty days and are sexually mature by twelve months.

== Threats and conservation aid ==
The Andean hairy armadillo has been given a bad reputation of that with its nine-banded cousin Dasypus novemcinctus and thought to carry leprosy. The main threat to this species is being hunted and having its shell sold for musical instrument making, body parts for medical remedies, and for food. Others, simply are killed because they are seen as a pest in that they cause agriculture destruction with their burrow making. Another threat is the fact that they are losing much of their habitat to road construction, farming, and deforestation. However, there are a few aids out there to try to help this species of armadillo survive. The Convention on International Trade in Endangered Species (CITES) regulates international trade in the Andean hairy armadillo. The demand for the armadillo's products still remain and many are killed regardless.
