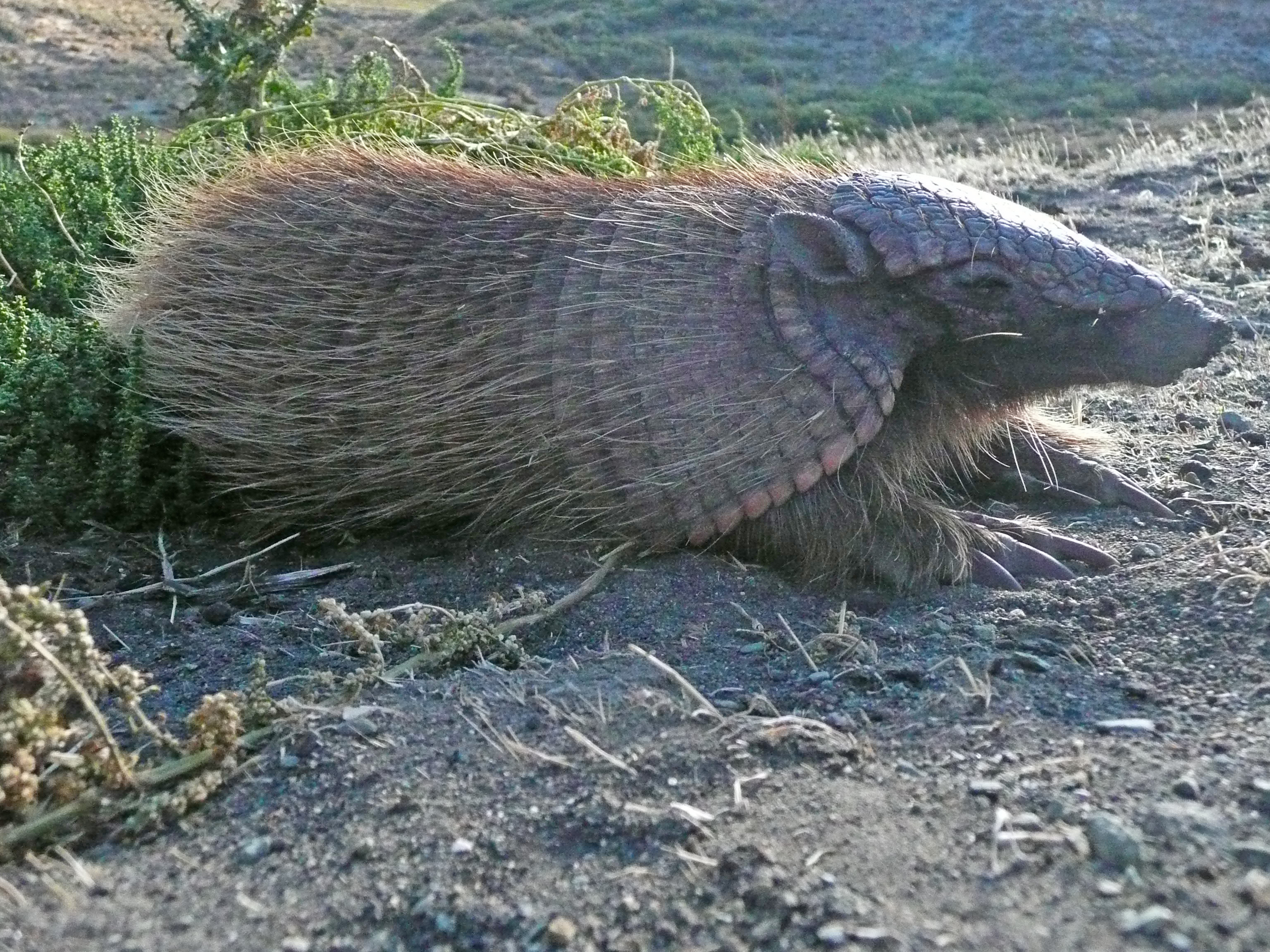

Conservation status
- Least Concern (IUCN 3.1)

Scientific classification
- Kingdom: Animalia
- Phylum: Chordata
- Class: Mammalia
- Order: Cingulata
- Family: Chlamyphoridae
- Genus: Chaetophractus
- Species: C. vellerosus

Binomial name
- Chaetophractus vellerosus (J.E. Gray, 1865)
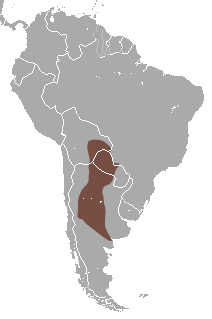
- Screaming hairy armadillo range

Synonyms
- Chaetophractus nationi (Thomas, 1894); Dasypus vellerosus J. E. Gray, 1865

= Screaming hairy armadillo =

Species of armadillo

The screaming hairy armadillo (Chaetophractus vellerosus) is a species of armadillo also known as the small screaming armadillo, crying armadillo or the small hairy armadillo. It is a burrowing armadillo found in the central and southern parts of South America. The adjective "screaming" derives from its habit of squealing when handled.

== Taxonomy ==
The animal was first described by J.E. Gray in 1865 from a specimen in the British Museum collected from Santa Cruz de la Sierra in eastern Bolivia as Dasypus vellerosus. Two subspecies are currently recognized (C. v. vellerosus (Gray, 1865) and C. v. pannosus (Gardner, 2007)) although the taxonomic validity of the split has been called into question.

== Description ==
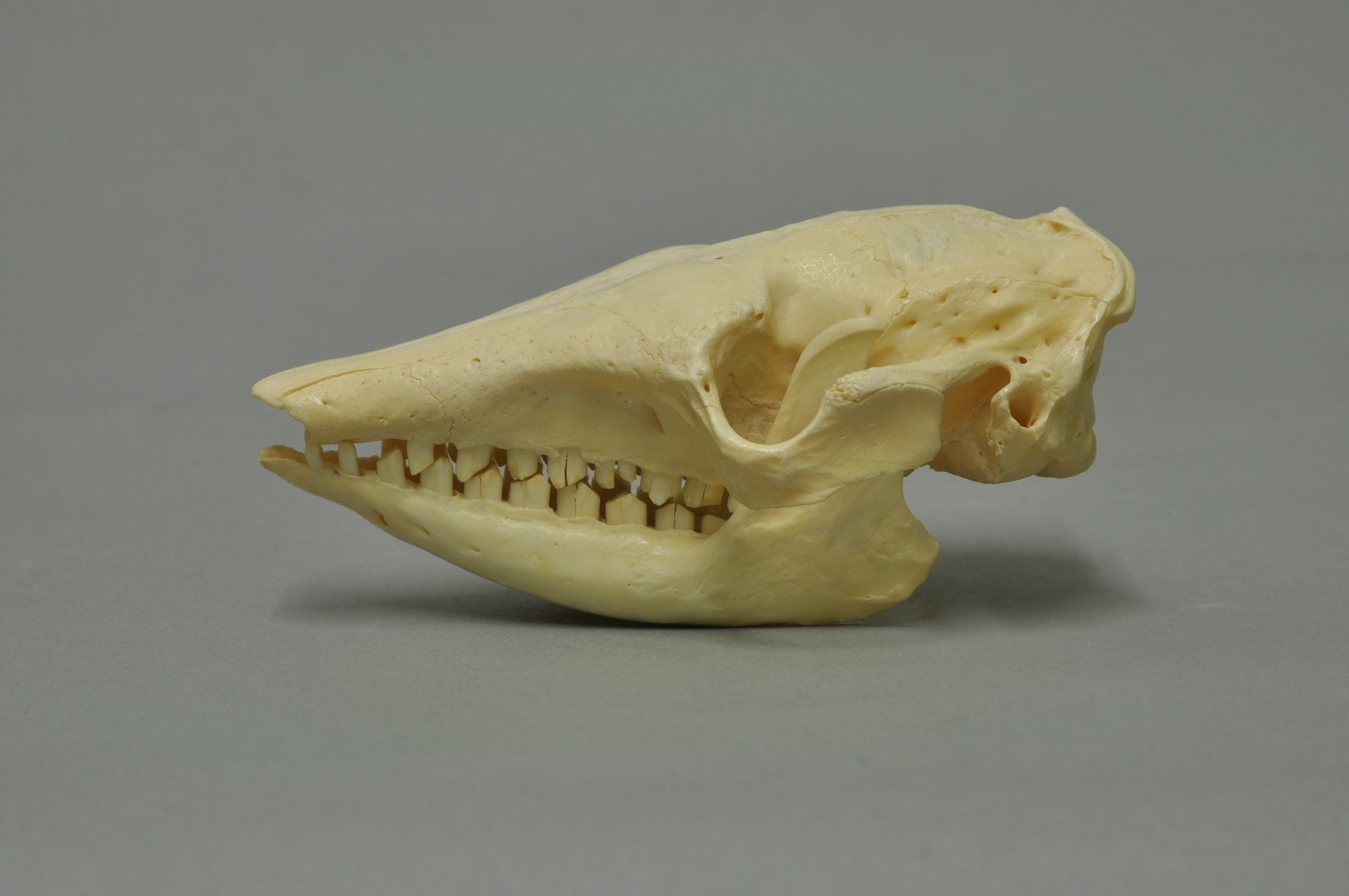
Skull of a screaming hairy armadillo

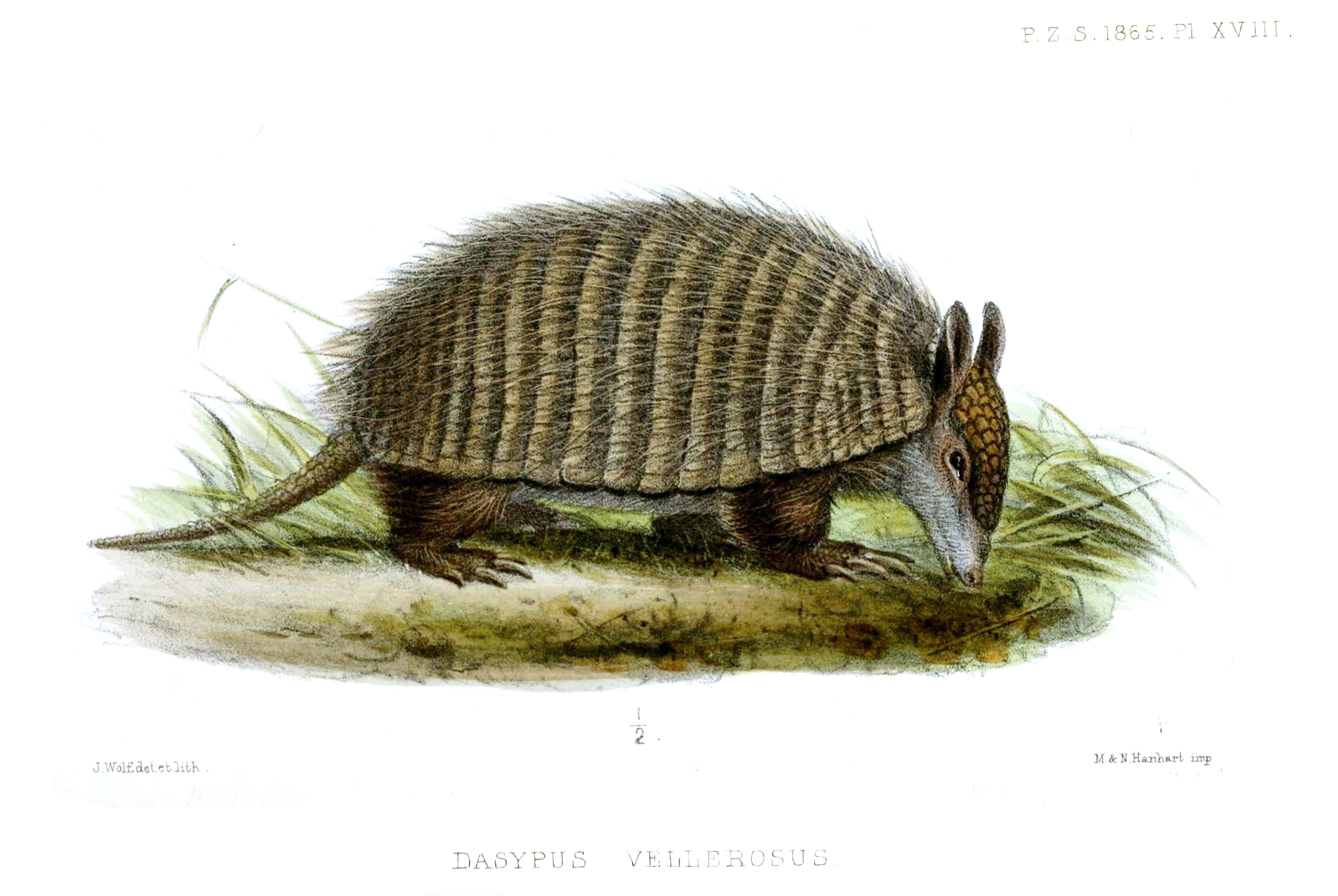
Illustration of the screaming hairy armadillo by Joseph Wolf provided in its first description by Gray in 1865

This is one of the smallest and slenderest species of the genus Chaetophractus, but it has longer ears than others in its genus. The male armadillo has a length ranging from 328 to 400 mm (12.9 to 15.7 in) with an average length of 376 mm (14.8 in), while the length of the female ranges from 265 to 419 mm (10.4 to 16.5 in) with an average length of 368 mm (14.5 in). The male weighs between 543 to 1,329 grams (19.2 to 46.9 oz), with an average of 860 grams (30 oz), while the range of weight for the female is 257 to 1,126 grams (9.1 to 39.7 oz), with average weight as 814 grams (28.7 oz).

The animal was initially described by Gray as follows:
"The forehead convex, with many polygonal shields; the dorsal shield covered with abundant elongated bristly hairs; the underside of the body covered with close hairs. Toes 5/5, the outer and inner hinder small."

These armadillos have more hair growth than other armadillo species. The armadillo has 18 bands of which six to eight are movable bands. The hair on the dorsum is light brown in colour.

== Range and habitat ==
The screaming hairy armadillo is a burrowing armadillo of arid areas from low to high altitudes. It is found in parts of the Gran Chaco and Pampas areas of Argentina, Bolivia, and Paraguay. An isolated population is found in eastern Buenos Aires Province in Argentina.

Its natural habitats are subtropical or tropical dry forests, temperate shrubland, subtropical or tropical dry shrubland, temperate grassland, subtropical or tropical dry lowland grassland, hot deserts, temperate desert, arable land, pastureland, and plantations. It is absent in rocky areas where the armadillo would not be able to burrow. The average annual rainfall in its main range is 200 to 600 mm (7.9 to 23.6 in), while the rainfall averages 1,000 mm (39 in) annually in the area of the Buenos Aires population.

== Behaviour ==
The armadillo is nocturnal by summer and diurnal in winter. It can subsist for long periods without water. It often burrows at the base of bushes and shrubs. It has multiple burrows in its range, and each burrow may have more than one entrance. When an animal is occupying a burrow, the entrance is usually sealed. A burrow may be 20 to 38 cm (7.9 to 15.0 in) in diameter and may be several metres long.

The home range of an armadillo is recorded to consist of a minimum area of 3.4 ha (8.4 acres). The animal does not build a nest in its burrow.

== Diet ==
When not in its burrow, the animal spends most of its time foraging. The armadillo is omnivorous; its diet consists of insects, vertebrates and plant material (especially pods of Prosopis), varying considerably depending upon the season. The animals increase their weight by up to 10% in winter, forming a layer of subcutaneous fat 1 to 2 cm (0.4 to 0.8 in) thick. Vertebrates form a significant part of an armadillo's diet, ranging from 27.7% by volume in summer to 13.9% in winter, the most common prey species being lizards, birds, frogs, and the mice species Eligmodontia typus and Phyllotis griseofulvus. This armadillo ingests a lot of sand while feeding, and it may occupy as much as 50% of the volume of its stomach at a time.

== Reproduction ==
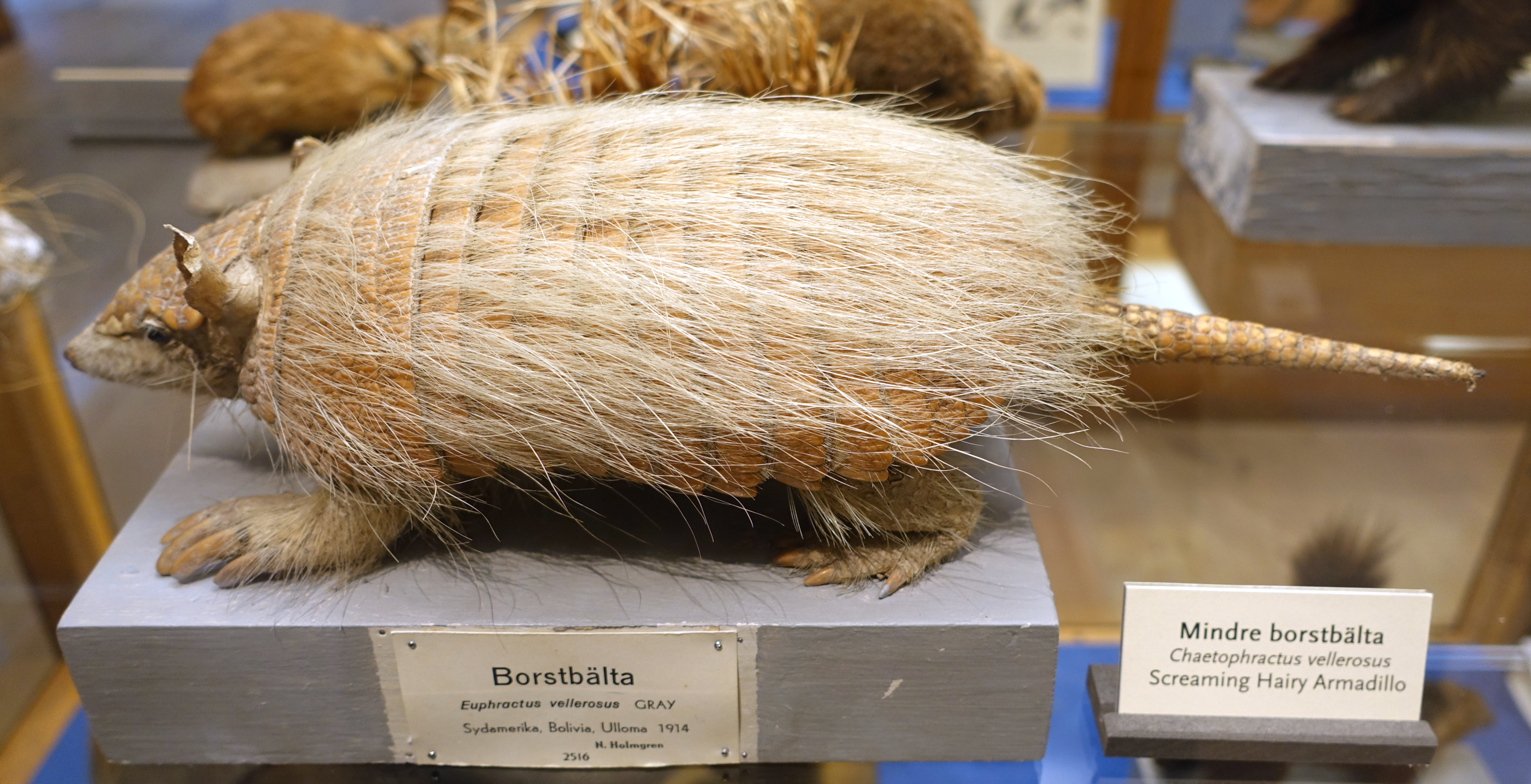
Preserved specimen at the Swedish Museum of Natural History

The gestation period of the armadillo is 60–75 days. The armadillos become sexually mature at 9 months and produce two litters per year.

== Human interaction ==
This armadillo is heavily hunted for its meat in parts of the Chaco region in Bolivia. It is at times considered an agricultural pest and killed by hunting dogs. The disjunct population of coastal Buenos Aires Province, Argentina, is adversely affected by mining activities. The carapace is particularly sought for making charangos, a South American musical instrument akin to a lute.
