= List of cingulates =

Species in mammal order Cingulata

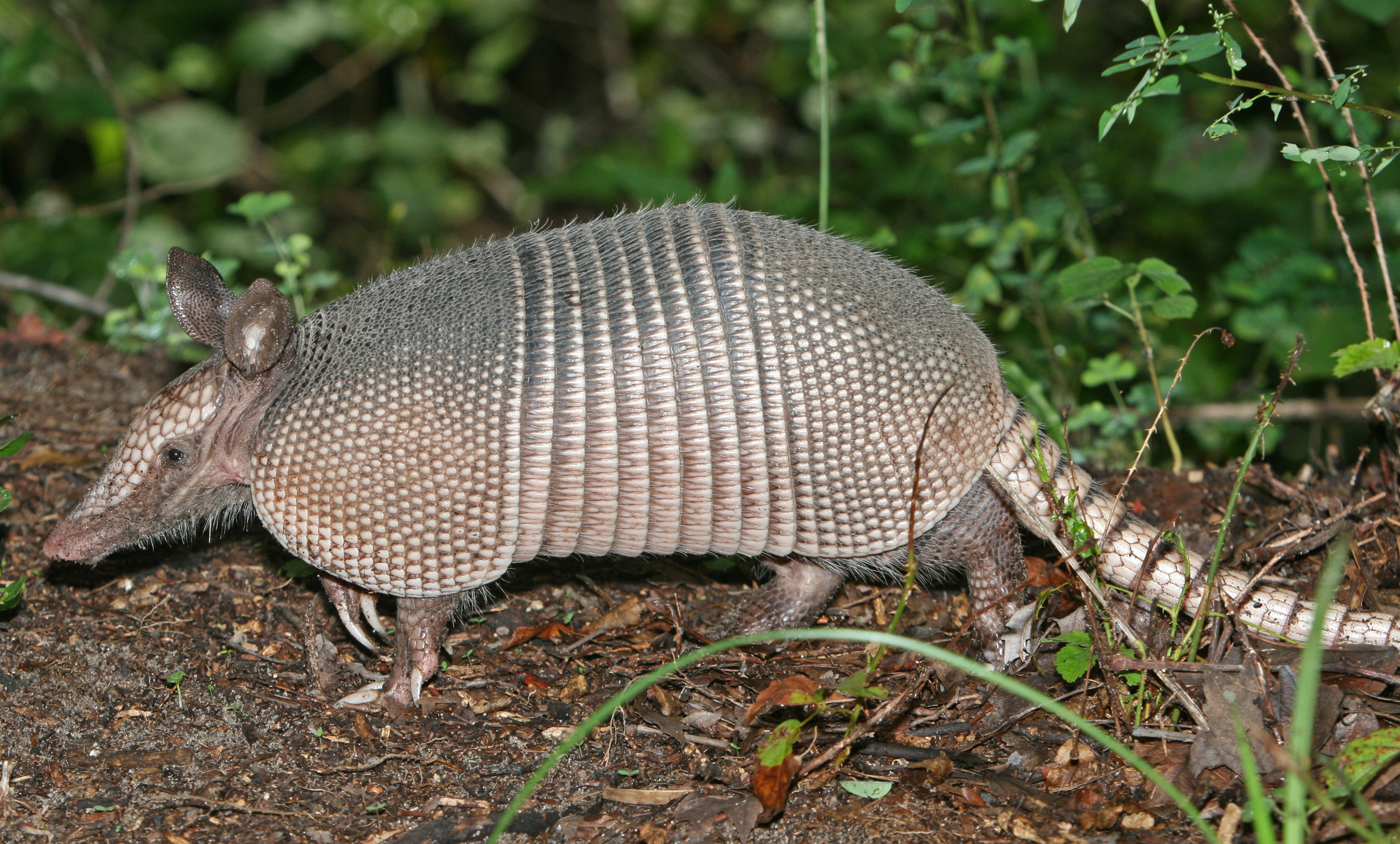
Nine-banded armadillo (Dasypus novemcinctus)

Cingulata is an order of armored placental mammals. Members of this order are called cingulates, or colloquially, armadillos. They are primarily found in South America, though the northern naked-tailed armadillo is found mainly in Central America and the nine-banded armadillo has a range extending into North America. They are generally found in forests, but also savannas, shrublands, and grasslands. They all follow a similar body plan, and range in size from the pink fairy armadillo, at 11 cm (4 in) plus a 2 cm (1 in) tail, to the giant armadillo, at 100 cm (39 in) plus a 50 cm (20 in) tail. No population estimates have been made for any cingulate species, though the giant armadillo and the Brazilian three-banded armadillo are categorized as vulnerable species.

The twenty-two extant species of Cingulata are divided into two families: Dasypodidae, containing a single genus of nine species in the subfamily Dasypodinae, and Chlamyphoridae, containing thirteen species split between the two genera in the subfamily Chlamyphorinae, three in the subfamily Euphractinae, and three in the subfamily Tolypeutinae. Prior to 2016, all four subfamilies were included in Dasypodidae, with Chlamyphoridae containing only extinct species of glyptodonts. Over one hundred extinct Cingulata species have been discovered, though due to ongoing research and discoveries the exact number and categorization is not fixed.

== Conventions ==
IUCN Red List categories
Conservation status
- EX: Extinct (0 species)
- EW: Extinct in the wild (0 species)
- CR: Critically endangered (0 species)
- EN: Endangered (0 species)
- VU: Vulnerable (2 species)
- NT: Near threatened (5 species)
- LC: Least concern (11 species)

Other categories
- DD: Data deficient (4 species)
- NE: Not evaluated (0 species)

The author citation for the species or genus is given after the scientific name; parentheses around the author citation indicate that this was not the original taxonomic placement. Conservation status codes listed follow the International Union for Conservation of Nature (IUCN) Red List of Threatened Species. Range maps are provided wherever possible; if a range map is not available, a description of the cingulate's range is provided. Ranges are based on the IUCN Red List for that species unless otherwise noted. All extinct species or subspecies listed alongside extant species went extinct after 1500 CE, and are indicated by a dagger symbol "†".

== Classification ==
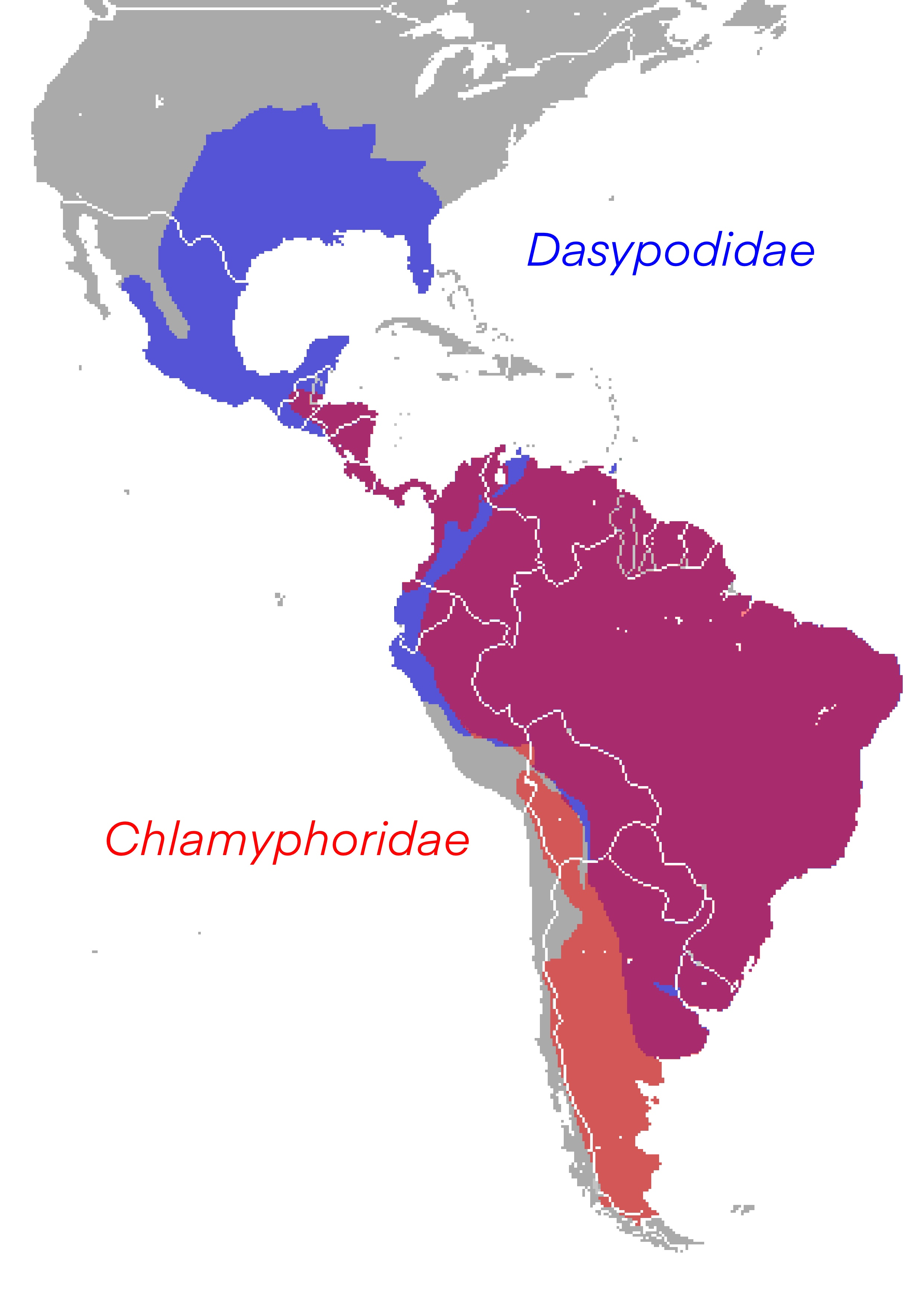
The distribution of Cingulata species

The order Cingulata consists of two families, Dasypodidae and Chlamyphoridae. Dasypodidae contains nine species in a single genus, while Chlamyphoridae contains thirteen species in eight genera, divided into three subfamilies. Many of these species are further subdivided into subspecies. This does not include hybrid species or extinct prehistoric species.

Family Dasypodidae

- Subfamily Dasypodinae
  - Genus Dasypus (long-nosed armadillos): nine species

Family Chlamyphoridae

- Subfamily Chlamyphorinae
  - Genus Calyptophractus (greater fairy armadillo): one species
  - Genus Chlamyphorus (pink fairy armadillo): one species
- Subfamily Euphractinae
  - Genus Chaetophractus (hairy armadillos): two species
  - Genus Euphractus (six-banded armadillo): one species
  - Genus Zaedyus (pichi): one species
- Subfamily Tolypeutinae
  - Genus Cabassous (naked-tailed armadillos): four species
  - Genus Priodontes (giant armadillo): one species
  - Genus Tolypeutes (three-banded armadillos): two species

- Cingulata
  - Dasypodidae
    - Dasypodinae
      - Dasypus
  - Chlamyphoridae
    - Euphractinae
      - Euphractus
      - - Chaetophractus
        - Zaedyus
    - - Chlamyphorinae
        - Calyptophractus
        - Chlamyphorus
      - Tolypeutinae
        - Priodontes
        - - Cabassous
          - Tolypeutes

== Cingulates ==
The following classification is based on the taxonomy described by the reference work Mammal Species of the World (2005), with augmentation by generally accepted proposals made since using molecular phylogenetic analysis.

=== Dasypodidae ===
==== Subfamily Dasypodinae ====
Genus Dasypus – Linnaeus, 1758 – nine species
Common name	Scientific name and subspecies	Range	Size and ecology	IUCN status and estimated population
East Amazonian long-nosed armadillo	D. beniensis Lönnberg, 1942	North-central South America (in orange)	Size: 51–58 cm (20–23 in) long, plus 33–48 cm (13–19 in) tail Habitat: Forest Diet: Insects	LC Unknown
Greater long-nosed armadillo	D. kappleri Krauss, 1862	Northern South America (in green)	Size: 51–58 cm (20–23 in) long, plus 33–48 cm (13–19 in) tail Habitat: Forest Diet: Insects	LC Unknown
Hairy long-nosed armadillo	D. pilosus (Fitzinger, 1856)	Western South America	Size: 32–44 cm (13–17 in) long, plus 23–31 cm (9–12 in) tail Habitat: Forest Diet: Insects	DD Unknown
Llanos long-nosed armadillo	D. sabanicola Mondolfi, 1968	Northern South America	Size: 25–31 cm (10–12 in) long, plus 17–21 cm (7–8 in) tail Habitat: Forest Diet: Termites, as well as ants, beetles, and worms	NT Unknown
Nine-banded armadillo	D. novemcinctus Linnaeus, 1758 Six subspecies: D. n. aequatorialis; D. n. fenestratus; D. n. hoplites; D. n. mexianae; D. n. mexicanus (Mexican long-nosed armadillo); D. n. novemcinctus	Central and northern South America, and central, southern, and eastern North America	Size: 35–57 cm (14–22 in) long, plus 24–45 cm (9–18 in) tail Habitat: Forest, savanna, shrubland, and grassland Diet: Omnivorous, including invertebrates, birds, fruit, and roots	LC Unknown
Seven-banded armadillo	D. septemcinctus Linnaeus, 1758	Eastern South America	Size: 24–31 cm (9–12 in) long, plus 12–17 cm (5–7 in) tail Habitat: Forest, savanna, and grassland Diet: Insects, seeds, and other plant material	LC Unknown
Southern long-nosed armadillo	D. hybridus Desmarest, 1804	Southeastern South America	Size: 26–31 cm (10–12 in) long, plus 15–19 cm (6–7 in) tail Habitat: Forest, savanna, shrubland, and grassland Diet: Ants, termites, and beetles, as well as plant material and small vertebrates	NT Unknown
West Amazonian long-nosed armadillo	D. pastasae (Thomas, 1901)	Northwestern South America (in purple)	Size: 51–58 cm (20–23 in) long, plus 33–48 cm (13–19 in) tail Habitat: Forest Diet: Insects	LC Unknown
Yepes's mulita	D. mazzai Yepes, 1933	South-central South America	Size: About 31 cm (12 in) long, plus 18–23 cm (7–9 in) tail Habitat: Forest Diet: Believed to be omnivorous with a preference for insects	DD Unknown

=== Chlamyphoridae ===
==== Subfamily Chlamyphorinae ====
Genus Calyptophractus – Fitzinger, 1871 – one species
Common name	Scientific name and subspecies	Range	Size and ecology	IUCN status and estimated population
Greater fairy armadillo	C. retusus (Burmeister, 1863)	Central South America	Size: 14–18 cm (6–7 in) long, plus 4 cm (2 in) tail Habitat: Savanna, shrubland, and desert Diet: Insects, worms, snails, roots, and small seeds	DD Unknown

Genus Chlamyphorus – Harlan, 1825 – one species
Common name	Scientific name and subspecies	Range	Size and ecology	IUCN status and estimated population
Pink fairy armadillo	C. truncatus Harlan, 1825	Southern South America	Size: 11–15 cm (4–6 in) long, plus 2–3 cm (1–1 in)tail Habitat: Savanna, shrubland, grassland, and desert Diet: insects, worms and snails, as well as possibly plants	DD Unknown

==== Subfamily Euphractinae ====
Genus Chaetophractus – Fitzinger, 1871 – two species
Common name	Scientific name and subspecies	Range	Size and ecology	IUCN status and estimated population
Big hairy armadillo	C. villosus (Desmarest, 1804)	Southern South America	Size: 22–40 cm (9–16 in) long, plus 9–17 cm (4–7 in) tail Habitat: Forest, savanna, shrubland, grassland, and desert Diet: Omnivorous, including insects, invertebrates, small vertebrates, plants, and carrion	LC Unknown
Screaming hairy armadillo	C. vellerosus (Gray, 1865) Two subspecies: C. v. pannosus; C. v. vellerosus	Southern South America	Size: 20–30 cm (8–12 in) long, plus tail Habitat: Savanna, shrubland, grassland, and desert Diet: Beetles, butterfly larvae, plants, and small vertebrates	LC Unknown

Genus Euphractus – Wagler, 1830 – one species
Common name	Scientific name and subspecies	Range	Size and ecology	IUCN status and estimated population
Six-banded armadillo	E. sexcinctus (Linnaeus, 1758) Five subspecies: E. s. boliviae; E. s. flavimanus; E. s. setosus; E. s. sexcinctus; E. s. tucumanus	Central and eastern South America	Size: 40–50 cm (16–20 in) long, plus 20–25 cm (8–10 in) tail Habitat: Forest, savanna, shrubland, and grassland Diet: Carrion, small vertebrates, insects, spiders, bird eggs, and plants	LC Unknown

Genus Zaedyus – Ameghino, 1889 – one species
Common name	Scientific name and subspecies	Range	Size and ecology	IUCN status and estimated population
Pichi	Z. pichiy (Desmarest, 1804) Two subspecies: Z. p. caurinus; Z. p. pichiy	Southern South America	Size: 26–34 cm (10–13 in) long, plus 10–12 cm (4–5 in) tail Habitat: Shrubland, grassland, and desert Diet: Insects, worms, and other invertebrates, as well as carrion	NT Unknown

==== Subfamily Tolypeutinae ====
Genus Cabassous – McMurtrie, 1831 – four species
Common name	Scientific name and subspecies	Range	Size and ecology	IUCN status and estimated population
Chacoan naked-tailed armadillo	C. chacoensis Wetzel, 1980	South-central South America	Size: 30–35 cm (12–14 in) long, plus 9–10 cm (4–4 in) tail Habitat: Forest, savanna, and shrubland Diet: Ants and termites, as well as seeds and fruit	NT Unknown
Greater naked-tailed armadillo	C. tatouay (Desmarest, 1804)	Eastern South America	Size: 36–49 cm (14–19 in) long, plus 15–20 cm (6–8 in) tail Habitat: Forest and grassland Diet: Ants and termites	LC Unknown
Northern naked-tailed armadillo	C. centralis (Miller, 1899)	Northern South America and Central America	Size: 30–40 cm (12–16 in) long, plus 5–7 cm (2–3 in) tail Habitat: Forest, savanna, and shrubland Diet: Termites and ants	LC Unknown
Southern naked-tailed armadillo	C. unicinctus (Linnaeus, 1758) Two subspecies: C. u. squamicaudis; C. u. unicinctus	Northern and central South America	Size: 35–44 cm (14–17 in) long, plus 16–20 cm (6–8 in) tail Habitat: Forest, shrubland, and grassland Diet: Ants and termites	LC Unknown

Genus Priodontes – F. Cuvier, 1825 – one species
Common name	Scientific name and subspecies	Range	Size and ecology	IUCN status and estimated population
Giant armadillo	P. maximus (Kerr, 1792)	Northern and central South America	Size: 75–100 cm (30–39 in) long, plus 50 cm (20 in) tail Habitat: Forest, savanna, and grassland Diet: Termites and certain ant species	VU Unknown

Genus Tolypeutes – Illiger, 1811 – two species
Common name	Scientific name and subspecies	Range	Size and ecology	IUCN status and estimated population
Brazilian three-banded armadillo	T. tricinctus (Linnaeus, 1758)	Eastern South America	Size: 23–25 cm (9–10 in) long, plus tail Habitat: Savanna and shrubland Diet: Ants, termites, beetles, and other insects, as well as plants	VU Unknown
Southern three-banded armadillo	T. matacus (Desmarest, 1804)	South-central South America	Size: 20–25 cm (8–10 in) long, plus tail Habitat: Savanna and shrubland Diet: Insects, as well as fruit and seeds	NT Unknown

== Sources ==
- Burnie, David (2017). Animal: The Definitive Visual Guide. DK. ISBN 978-1-4654-7086-7.
- Carwardine, Mark (2008). Animal. Sterling Publishing. ISBN 978-1-4027-5623-8.
- Gardner, Alfred L. (2005). Wilson, Don E.; Reeder, DeeAnn M. (eds.). Mammal Species of the World. Vol. 1 (3rd ed.). Johns Hopkins University Press. ISBN 978-0-8018-8221-0.
