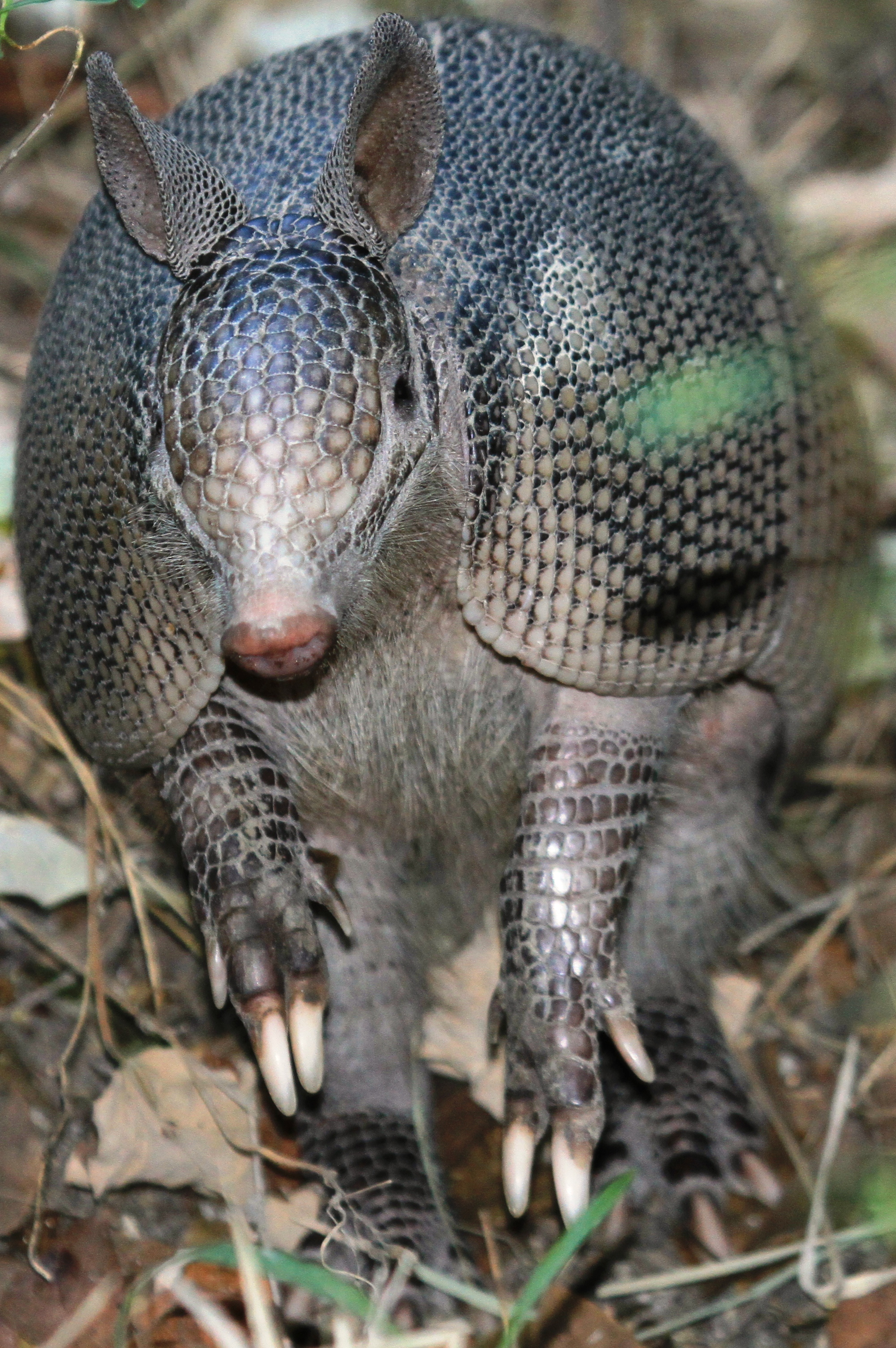
- Female Mexican long-nosed armadillo in Nuevo León, Mexico

Conservation status
- Least Concern (IUCN 3.1)

Scientific classification
- Kingdom: Animalia
- Phylum: Chordata
- Class: Mammalia
- Infraclass: Placentalia
- Order: Cingulata
- Family: Dasypodidae
- Genus: Dasypus
- Species: D. mexicanus

Binomial name
- Dasypus mexicanus W. C. H. Peters, 1865

Synonyms
- Tatusia mexicana (J.E. Gray, 1873)

= Mexican long-nosed armadillo =

Species of armadillo native to the Americas

The Mexican long-nosed armadillo (Dasypus mexicanus) or northern nine-banded armadillo is a species of armadillo native to North and Central America. Until 2024, the species was considered a subspecies of the nine-banded armadillo classified as (Dasypus novemcinctus mexicanus). A study published in Systematic Biology reclassified it as a genetically distinct species.

Its ancestors originated in South America and remained there until the formation of the Isthmus of Panama allowed them to enter North America as part of the Great American Interchange. The Mexican long-nosed armadillo is a solitary, mainly nocturnal animal, found in many kinds of habitats, from mature and secondary rainforests to grassland and dry scrub. It is an insectivore, feeding chiefly on ants, termites, and other small invertebrates. The armadillo can jump 91–120 cm (3–4 ft) straight in the air if sufficiently frightened, making it a particular danger on roads. It is the state small mammal of Texas.

== Description ==
Adult Mexican long-nosed armadillo generally weigh from 6–9 lb (2.7–4.1 kg). Total length may be up to 32 in (81 cm). The outer shell is composed of ossified dermal scutes covered by nonoverlapping, keratinized epidermal scales, which are connected by flexible bands of skin. This armor covers the back, sides, head, tail, and outside surfaces of the legs. The underside of the body and the inner surfaces of the legs have no armored protection. Instead, they are covered by tough skin and a layer of coarse hair. The vertebrae attach to the carapace. The claws on the middle toes of the forefeet are elongated for digging, though not to the same degree as those of the much larger giant armadillo of South America. Their low metabolic rate and poor thermoregulation make them best suited for semitropical environments. Unlike the South American three-banded armadillos, the Mexican long-nosed armadillo cannot roll itself into a ball. It is, however, capable of traversing rivers by inflating its intestines and floating, or by sinking and running across the riverbed. The second is possible due to its ability to hold its breath for up to six minutes, an adaptation originally developed for allowing the animal to keep its snout submerged in soil for extended periods while foraging. Although nine is the typical number of bands on the Mexican long-nosed armadillo, the actual number varies by geographic range. Armadillos possess the teeth typical of all sloths and anteaters. The teeth are all small, peg-like molars with open roots and no enamel. Incisors do form in the embryos, but quickly degenerate and are usually absent by birth.

== Habitat ==
The Mexican long-nosed armadillo evolved in a warm, rainy environment, and is still most commonly found in regions resembling its ancestral home. As a very adaptable animal, though, it can also be found in scrublands, open prairies, and tropical rainforests. It cannot thrive in particularly cold or dry environments, as its large surface area, which is not well insulated by fat, makes it especially susceptible to heat and water loss. Recently, Mexican long-nosed armadillo have been found as far north as Virginia, with several studies suggesting this could get more common as temperatures rise.

== Range ==
The Mexican long-nosed armadillo has been rapidly expanding its range both north and east within the United States, where it is the only regularly occurring species of armadillo. The armadillo crossed the Rio Grande from Mexico in the late 19th century, and was introduced in Florida at about the same time by humans. By 1995, the species had become well established in Texas, Oklahoma, Louisiana, Arkansas, Mississippi, Alabama, Georgia and Florida, and had been sighted as far afield as Kansas, Missouri, Tennessee, Kentucky, and the Carolinas. A decade later, the armadillo had become established in all of those areas and continued its migration, being sighted as far north as southern Nebraska, southern Illinois, and southern Indiana. The primary cause of this rapid expansion is explained simply by the species having few natural predators within the United States, little desire on the part of Americans to hunt or eat the armadillo, and the animals' high reproductive rate. The northern expansion of the armadillo is expected to continue until the species reaches as far north as Ohio, Pennsylvania, New Jersey and Connecticut, and all points southward on the East Coast of the United States. Further northward and westward expansion will probably be limited by the armadillo's poor tolerance of harsh winters, due to its lack of insulating fat and its inability to hibernate. As of 2009, newspaper reports indicated the Mexican long-nosed armadillo seems to have expanded its range northward as far as Omaha, Nebraska, in the west, and Kentucky Dam and Evansville, Indiana, in the east. In 1995, armadillos were only seen in the southern tip of South Carolina, and within two to three years, they had swept across most of the state. In late 2009, North Carolina began considering the establishment of a hunting season for armadillo, following reports that the species has been moving into the southern reaches of the state (roughly between the areas of Charlotte and Wilmington). Outside the United States, the Mexican long-nosed armadillo ranges southward through Costa Rica.

A 2014 genetic study by Shapiro et al. found that a 10,000-12,000 year-old fossil tibia from Medford Cave, central Florida, which was previously thought to belong to the extinct beautiful armadillo (D. bellus), actually belonged to the Mexican long-nosed armadillo. This suggests that the Mexican long-nosed armadillo naturally inhabited the southeastern United States, including Florida, during the Late Pleistocene until its extirpation from the region early in the Holocene. It is unknown why the armadillo did not recolonize the United States until European settlement of the region, but it has been suggested that hunting by Coahuiltecan tribes and habitat clearance by intentionally-set brushfires prevented armadillos from previously recolonizing the region. Armadillo movement patterns also often follow corridors such as railroads and roads, which likely helped to facilitate its rapid expansion into and throughout the United States.

== Diet ==
Mexican long-nosed armadillos are generally insectivores. They forage for meals by thrusting their snouts into loose soil and leaf litter and frantically digging in erratic patterns, stopping occasionally to dig up grubs, beetles (perhaps the main portion of this species' prey selection), ants, termites, grasshoppers, other insects, millipedes, centipedes, arachnids, worms, and other terrestrial invertebrates, which their sensitive noses can detect through 8 in (20 cm) of soil. They then lap up the insects with their sticky tongues. Mexican long-nosed armadillo have been observed to roll about on ant hills to dislodge and consume the resident ants. They supplement their diets with amphibians and small reptiles, especially in more wintery months when such prey tends to be more sluggish, and occasionally bird eggs and baby mammals. Carrion is also eaten, although perhaps the species is most attracted to the maggots borne by carcasses rather than the meat itself. Less than 10% of the diet of this species is composed by nonanimal matter, though fungi, tubers, fruits, and seeds are occasionally eaten.

== Behavior ==
Mexican long-nosed armadillo are solitary, largely nocturnal animals that come out to forage around dusk. They are extensive burrowers, with a single animal sometimes maintaining up to 12 burrows on its range. These burrows are roughly 20 cm (8 in) wide, 210 cm (7 ft) deep, and 760 cm (25 ft) long. Armadillos mark their territory with urine, feces, and excretions from scent glands found on the eyelids, nose, and feet. Males hold breeding territories and may become aggressive in order to keep other males out of their home range to increase chances of pairing with a female. Territorial disputes are settled by kicking and chasing. When they are not foraging, armadillos shuffle along fairly slowly, stopping occasionally to sniff the air for signs of danger.

=== Predation ===
If alarmed, Mexican long-nosed armadillo can flee with surprising speed. Occasionally, a large predator may be able to ambush the armadillo before it can clear a distance, and breach the hard carapace with a well-placed bite or swipe. If the fleeing escape fails, the armadillo may quickly dig a shallow trench and lodge itself inside. Predators are rarely able to dislodge the animal once it has burrowed itself, and abandon their prey when they cannot breach the armadillo's armor or grasp its tapered tail. Due to their softer carapaces, juvenile armadillos are more likely to fall victim to natural predation and their cautious behavior generally reflects this. Young Mexican long-nosed armadillo tend to forage earlier in the day and are more wary of the approach of an unknown animal (including humans) than are adults. Their known natural predators include cougars (perhaps the leading predator), coyotes, black bears, red wolves, jaguars, alligators, bobcats, and large raptors. Many thousands fall victim to roadkill caused by auto accidents every year.

== Reproduction ==
Mating takes place during a two-to-three month long mating season, which occurs from July–August. A single egg is fertilized and develops into a blastocyst, but implantation is delayed for three to four months to ensure the young will not be born during an unfavorable time. Once the blastocyst does implant in the uterus it splits into four identical embryos via collapse of the common amnion and subsequent division of the embryonic shield. Each of the four embryos has a separate amnion and umbilical cord, but all four are attached to a common placenta. The gestation period is four months. They are born in March and weigh 85 g (3 oz). After birth, the quadruplets remain in the burrow, living off the mother's milk for about three months. They then begin to forage with the mother, eventually leaving after six months to a year.

Mexican long-nosed armadillo reach sexual maturity at the age of one year, and reproduce every year for the rest of their 12-to-15-year lifespans. A single female can produce up to 56 young over the course of her life. This high reproductive rate is a major cause of the species' rapid expansion.

== Effect on the environment ==
The foraging of Mexican long-nosed armadillo can cause mild damage to the root systems of certain plants. Skunks, cotton rats, burrowing owls, pine snakes, and rattlesnakes can be found living in abandoned armadillo burrows. Occasionally, the armadillo may threaten the endangered gopher tortoise by aggressively displacing them from their burrows and claiming the burrows for themselves. Studies have shown the fan-tailed warbler habitually follows armadillos to feed on insects and other invertebrates displaced by them.

They are typically hunted for their meat, which is said to taste like pork, but are more frequently killed as a result of their tendency to steal the eggs of poultry and game birds. They are also valuable for use in medical research, as they are among the few mammals other than humans susceptible to leprosy. In Texas, Mexican long-nosed armadillo are raised to participate in armadillo racing, a small-scale, but well-established sport in which the animals scurry down a 12-metre (40 ft) track.

=== Hoover hog ===
During the Great Depression, the species was hunted for its meat in East Texas, where it was known as "poor man's pork", or the "Hoover hog" by those who considered President Herbert Hoover to be responsible for the Depression. Earlier, German settlers in Texas would often refer to the armadillo as Panzerschwein ("armored pig"). In 1995, the Mexican long-nosed armadillo was, with some resistance, made the state small mammal of Texas, where it is considered a pest and is often seen dead on the roadside.
