= Dasypus neogaeus =

Dasypus neogaeus Temporal range: Late Miocene (Huayquerian) ~9–6.8 Ma

Scientific classification
- Kingdom: Animalia
- Phylum: Chordata
- Class: Mammalia
- Order: Cingulata
- Family: Dasypodidae
- Genus: Dasypus
- Species: †D. neogaeus

Binomial name
- †Dasypus neogaeus Ameghino, 1891

Extinct species of armadillo

Dasypus neogaeus is an extinct species of armadillo, belonging to the genus Dasypus, alongside the modern nine-banded armadillo. The only known fossil is a single osteoderm, though it has been lost, that was found in the Late Miocene strata of Argentina.

== History and classification ==
Fossils of Dasypus neogaeus were first collected from the Late Miocene “Osiferous Conglomerate” of the Ituzaingo Formation of Parana, Entre Rios Province in northern Argentina by paleontologist Florentino Ameghino. However, some authors recently have stated that the fossils may have come from the Pleistocene. The fossils consisted only of a single, mobile osteoderm from the dorsal carapace. The osteoderm was then sent to the Bernardino Rivadavia Natural Sciences Argentine Museum in Buenos Aires, where it was described and named Dasypus neogaeus by Ameghino in 1891. Since then, no additional fossils have been assigned to the taxon, although fossils of the same age have been unearthed in other areas of Argentina.

== Description ==
The holotype osteoderm measures only around 13 millimeters long, but indicates a species larger than Dasypus hybridus but smaller than D. novemcinctus. The osteoderm also differs from that of other species in that it bears more piliferous foramina, 8 in total, on the posterior end than D. novemcinctus. Although it only bears 2 physical diagnostic features and is known from very fragmentary fossils, more diagnostic characters could be in the histological anatomy of the osteoderm.

== Paleobiology ==
Based on the taphonomic and environmental information provided by the “Osiferous Conglomerate” the holotype was found in, D. neogaeus lived in areas with gallery forests near water. This is contrary to the modern Dasypus species, which live in grasslands, suggesting that Dasypus and other smaller armadillos recently underwent an ecological change.

== Paleoenvironment ==
Fossils have only been unearthed from the Ituzaingó Formation of Entre Rios, Argentina, which preserves vast tidal flats similar to those in the modern day Amazon and a warm climate. Large, herbivorous notoungulate mammals in the Ituzaingó Formation were widespread, including the toxodontids Xotodon and Adinotherium, and litopterns such as Brachytherium, Cullinia, Diadiaphorus, Neobrachytherium, Oxyodontherium, Paranauchenia, Promacrauchenia, Proterotherium and Scalabrinitherium. Large, armored glyptodonts like Palaehoplophorus, Eleutherocercus, and Plohophorus lived in the area as well as other cingulates like the pampatheres Kraglievichia and Scirrotherium. Carnivores included the phorusrhacids Devincenzia and Andalgalornis and sparassodonts, with giant crocodilians like Gryposuchus and Mourasuchus in the freshwater. Bamboos, coconut palms, and other palms were prevalent.
