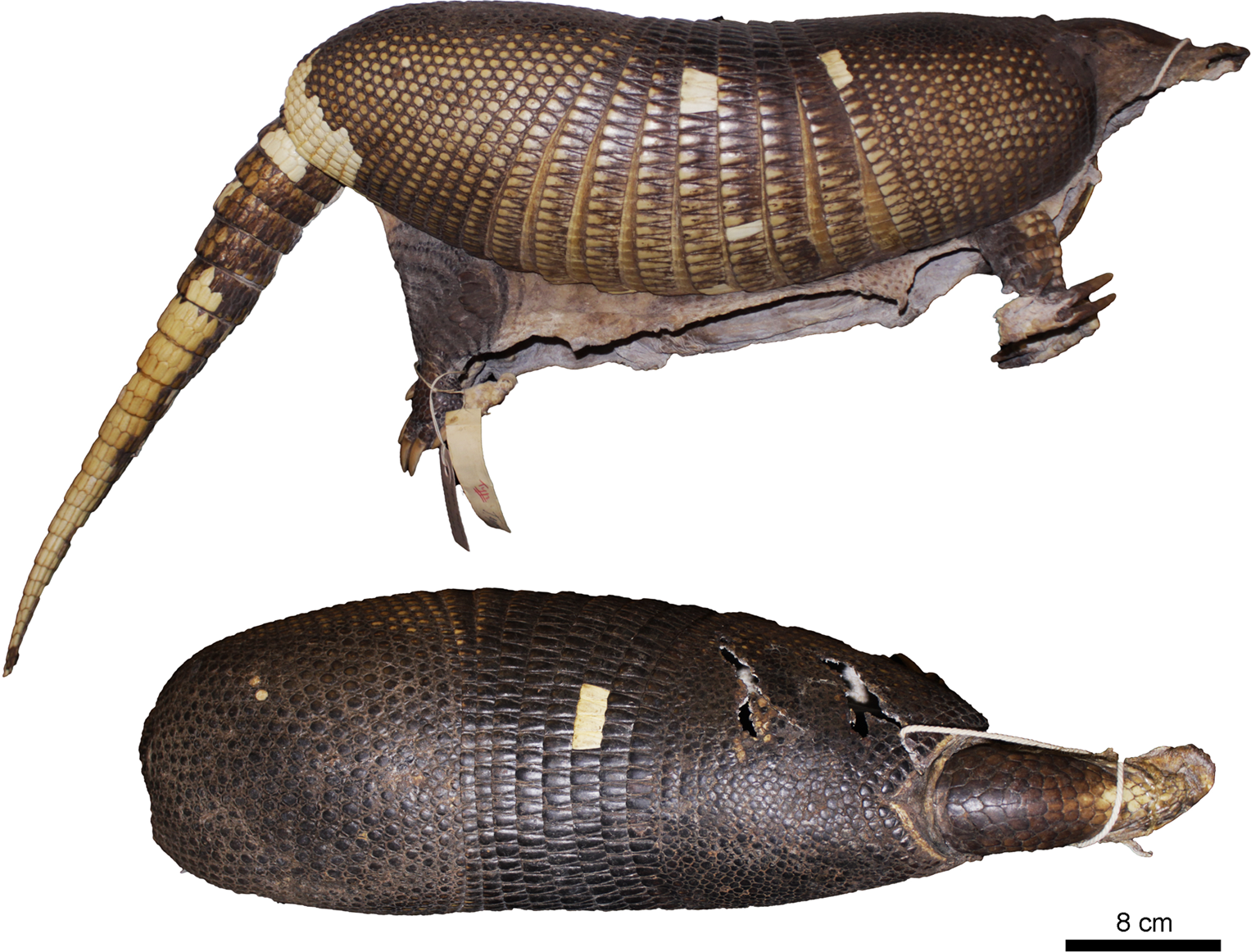

Conservation status
- Least Concern (IUCN 3.1)

Scientific classification
- Kingdom: Animalia
- Phylum: Chordata
- Class: Mammalia
- Infraclass: Placentalia
- Order: Cingulata
- Family: Dasypodidae
- Genus: Dasypus
- Species: D. beniensis

Binomial name
- Dasypus beniensis (Lönnberg, 1942)

Synonyms
- Dasypus kappleri beniensis Lönnberg, 1942

= East Amazonian long-nosed armadillo =

Species of mammal

The East Amazonian long-nosed armadillo (Dasypus beniensis) is a species of armadillo found in the jungles between the Amazon, Madeira, and Madre de Dios rivers in northern Brazil and Bolivia.

== Taxonomy ==
Specimens of D. beniensis were first recorded in 1937, when on October 25 of that year an adult female (catalog number NRM 583386) was collected by A. M. Olalla from a site 3 kilometres (1.9 mi) from the confluence of the Rio Madre de Dios with Rio Beni in Victoria, northern Bolivia. It was then taken to the Swedish Museum of Natural History in Stockholm where it was later described by Swedish naturalist Einar Lönnberg in 1942 as a subspecies of the previously named species Dasypus kappleri. The name derives from the Rio Beni, where the type specimen had been collected. D. beniensis was later considered a junior synonym of the earlier named species D. pastasae by mammalogist Angel Cabrera in 1948, a sentiment subsequently followed without comment by authors until 2018. The distinct nature of the anatomy of D. beniensis was briefly noted by Feijo & Cordiero-Estrela (2016), but a much more detailed reassessment was published by Feijo and colleagues in 2018 which saw the revalidation of D. beniensis on a species level.

== Description ==
Dasypus beniensis, as in other species of armadillo, was adorned with a carapace composed of bony osteoderms which were especially rough in D. beniensis and D. pastasae. It had a long, straight tail enraptured in caudal osteoderms that formed rings around the underlying skin. The limbs were short and stout, bearing large claws and movable elbows to assist with digging. The skull is elongated with a triangular outline in dorsal view, which narrowed towards the tip of the snout. The cranium was taller topped by a cephalic shield, with a maxilla lined with small, peg-like teeth adapted for the consumption of insects and small animals. In the skull, it is well-distinguished from other species of the genus which were overlooked for many years. The cephalic shield, a cap on the skull made up of osteoderms, lacks a occipital lobe that is well-formed which is usually prominent in other members of the genus. The lacrimal on the posterior part of the skull is greatly smoothed with a curve, while it is straighter in other forms. The palatine has a crest on its lateral face, while at the posterior margin it is convex. The parietals are weakly-developed and pentagonal in outline instead of broad in D. pastasae.
