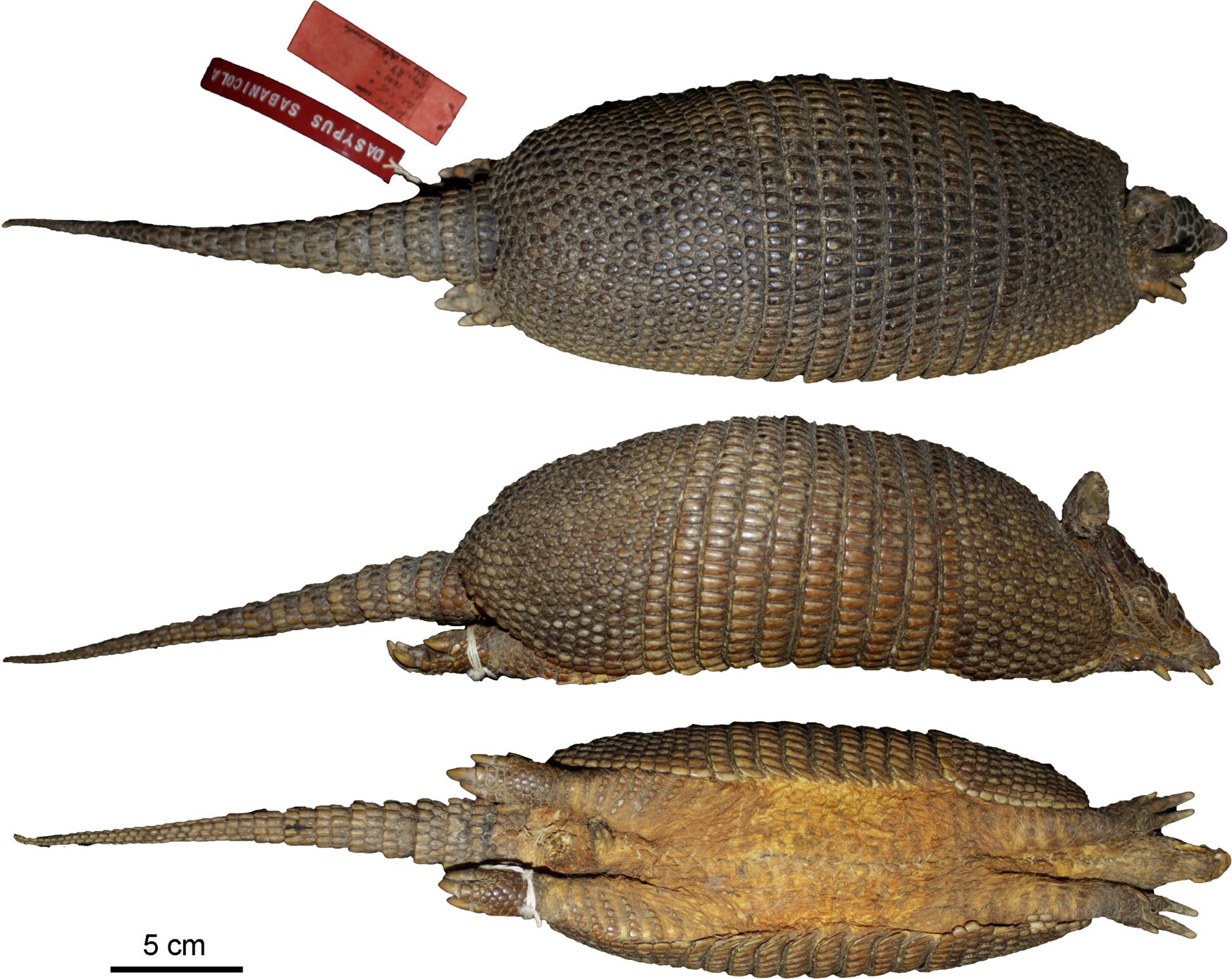

Conservation status
- Near Threatened (IUCN 3.1)

Scientific classification
- Kingdom: Animalia
- Phylum: Chordata
- Class: Mammalia
- Infraclass: Placentalia
- Order: Cingulata
- Family: Dasypodidae
- Genus: Dasypus
- Species: D. sabanicola

Binomial name
- Dasypus sabanicola Mondolfi, 1968
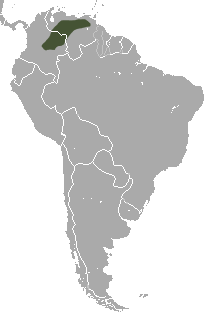
- Llanos long-nosed armadillo range

= Llanos long-nosed armadillo =

Species of mammal

The Llanos long-nosed armadillo (Dasypus sabanicola) or northern long-nosed armadillo is a species of armadillo in the family Dasypodidae. It is endemic to Colombia and Venezuela, where its habitat is the intermittently flooded grassland of the Llanos. The species is closely related to the nine-banded armadillo and the great long-nosed armadillo. It has very little hair and can weigh up to 22 pounds (9.5 kg), and can grow to about 2.1 feet (60 cm) long. It lives in dense cover near limestone formations. Like most other armadillos, it eats ants.

== Description ==
Like other members of its genus, the Llanos long-nosed armadillo has a carapace, a hard armour-like covering consisting of ossified dermal plates covered with leathery skin. The hind part of the body is covered by six to eleven moveable bands which give the animal flexibility. The tail is armoured, but the face, neck and underparts lack armour and are sparsely covered with pale fur. The legs are short and the four toes on the forefeet and five on the hind feet are long with strong claws. Adults grow to a maximum head-and-body length of around 570 mm (22 in) with a tail of up to 483 mm (19 in), and a weight of up to 10 kg (22 lb).

== Distribution and habitat ==
This armadillo is endemic to the tropical northern part of South America. Its range includes lowland parts of Venezuela and Colombia where its altitudinal range is 25 to 500 m (82 to 1,640 ft) above sea level. Its habitat is the Llanos, a vast grassy plain that periodically floods.

== Ecology ==
The species has a home range somewhere between 1.7 and 11.6 hectares (4.2 and 28.7 acres). It emerges to forage at dawn and dusk and feeds on small invertebrates such as ants, termites and beetles. In Venezuela, it breeds between October and March. The litter size is usually four. As is the case with other members of Dasypus, all the embryos develop from a single zygote, making them identical quadruplets.

== Status ==
The floodplains on which D. sabanicola lives are increasingly being used for the production of biofuels, for agro-industry and for tree plantations. This reduces the quantity and the quality of the habitat available to the armadillo. Population counts have not been done, but the animal is hunted for food, and there are reports from people living in the area that it is being seen less often. For these reasons, and as a precautionary measure, the International Union for Conservation of Nature has assessed the animal's conservation status as "near-threatened".
