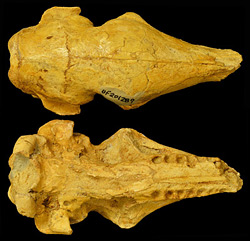
- Skull seen from two angles

Scientific classification
- Kingdom: Animalia
- Phylum: Chordata
- Class: Mammalia
- Infraclass: Placentalia
- Order: Cingulata
- Family: Dasypodidae
- Genus: Dasypus
- Species: †D. bellus

Binomial name
- †Dasypus bellus Simpson 1930

Synonyms
- Tatu bellus Simpson 1930

= Dasypus bellus =

Dasypus bellus Temporal range: Mid-Late Pleistocene (Irvingtonian-Rancholabrean) ~1.8–0.012 Ma

Extinct species of mammal

Dasypus bellus, the beautiful armadillo, is an extinct armadillo species endemic to North America and South America from the Pleistocene, living from 1.8 mya—11,000 years ago, existing for approximately 1.789 million years.

Slightly larger than its living relative, the nine-banded armadillo, its fossils are known from Florida and records extend west to New Mexico and north to Iowa and Indiana.

== Description ==
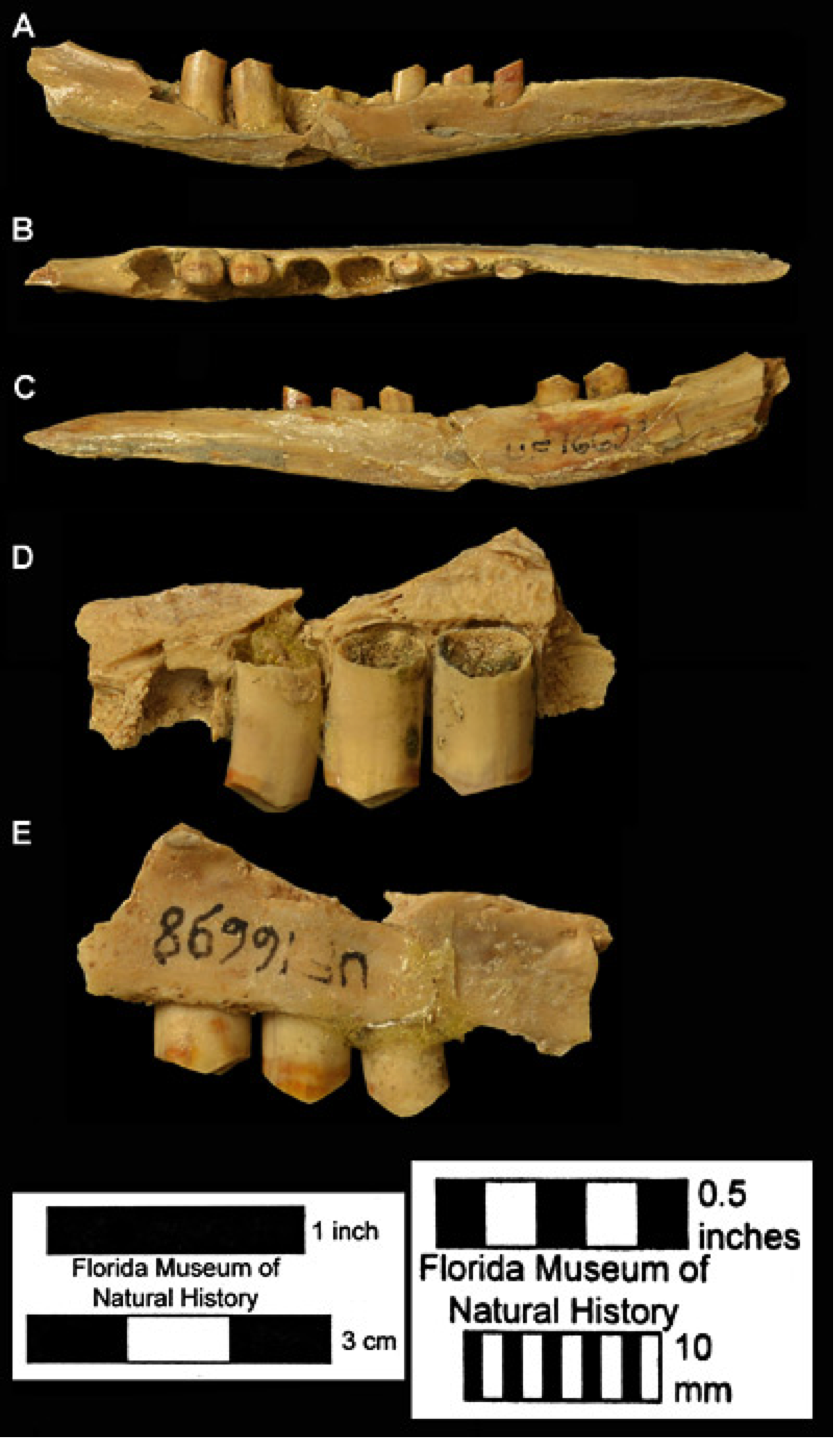

D. bellus had small, simple, peg-like teeth similar to D. novemcinctus. Its maximum length was approximately 1.2 metres (3.9 ft) long, twice the size of the nine-banded armadillo. The osteoderms of the shell and the limb bones of D. bellus are about two to two and a half times the extent of those of the living modern nine-banded armadillo D. novemcinctus. The small D. bellus overlapped in size with the D. novemcinctus. The body size of D. bellus decreased during the late Pleistocene, suggesting that its body size was variable.

== Relations ==
=== DNA ===
DNA testing of two D. bellus fossils and modern armadillos has proved the species are not genetically the same. However, one of the D. bellus fossils proved to be a specimen of D. novemcinctus. The mistake was due to the high morphological similarities between the two species. It also proved that D. novemcinctus was in Florida much earlier than previously thought.

=== Fossils ===
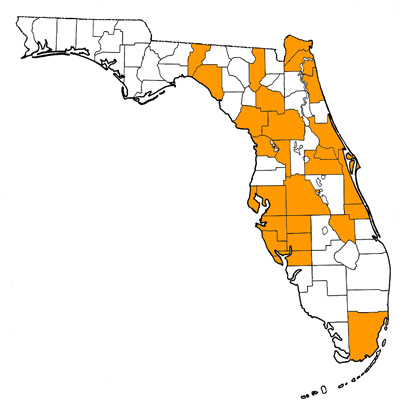
Dasypus bellus fossil occurrence in Florida

The earliest fossils are found in early Pleistocene South America, and would emigrate into southern North America. They have been found at many sites in Florida, including caves, sinkholes, river sites, coastal, and lake deposits. By the late Pleistocene, D. bellus spread into the American Southwest. The living animals apparently preferred dry scrub environments. The most frequent type of fossil found are isolated osteoderms. The most common types of osteoderms that have been found are the hexagonal elements, which include most of osteoderms covering the shoulder or pectoral regions. Other types of osteoderms include those covering the pelvic region of the carapace or the so-called buckler or immovable osteoderms and the elongate rectangular elements from the movable bands, the imbricating or movable osteoderms.

=== Modern descendants ===
The beautiful armadillo likely shares a common lineage with numerous species of large armadillos from the Pleistocene of South America. This includes Propraopus sulcatus and Propraopus grandis. D. kappleri, the great long-nosed armadillo, which is the largest living species of Dasypus from tropical South America, has the same features of osteoderms as D. bellus. They also share a large, unreduced fifth digit on the manus. The range of D. novemcinctus, the smaller nine-banded armadillo, has expanded out of Mexico and into much of the former range of Dasypus bellus. The two species are morphologically similar to each other. This had led many to believe that they might be a single, highly adaptable species that has gone through a course of phenotypical changes along with geographical range fluctuations causing from environmental changes. However, as previously stated, DNA research has proved D. bellus and D. novemcinctus to be separate species.
