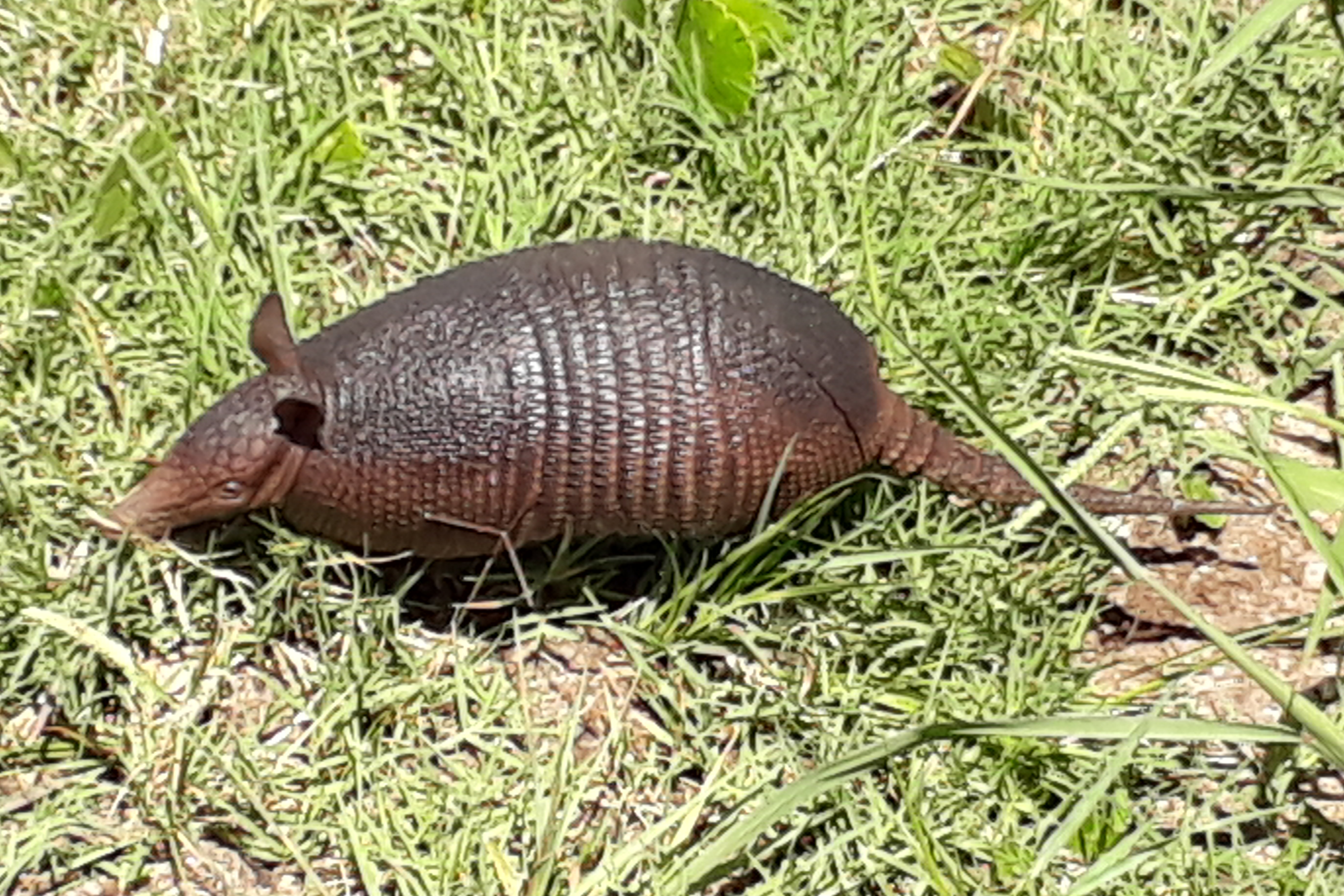
- Near Barra de Valizas, Uruguay

Conservation status
- Least Concern (IUCN 3.1)

Scientific classification
- Kingdom: Animalia
- Phylum: Chordata
- Class: Mammalia
- Order: Cingulata
- Family: Dasypodidae
- Genus: Dasypus
- Species: D. septemcinctus

Binomial name
- Dasypus septemcinctus Linnaeus, 1758
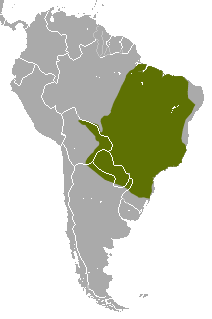
- Seven-banded armadillo range

= Seven-banded armadillo =

Species of armadillo

The seven-banded armadillo (Dasypus septemcinctus), also known as the Brazilian lesser long-nosed armadillo, is a species of armadillo from South America found in Paraguay, Argentina, Bolivia and Brazil. It is a solitary nocturnal, terrestrial animal, living mostly in dry habitats, outside of rainforest regions.

== Description ==
Long-nosed armadillos have a broad, depressed body, an obtusely pointed rostrum, long, pointed ears and short legs. The carapace consists of two immobile plates, separated by six or seven movable bands, which are connected to each other by a fold of hairless skin. The carapace is mostly blackish, hairless and with the scales of the anterior edge of the movable bands not notably different in colour from the rest of the dorsum. Lateral scutes have dark blackish-pink centres only slightly discernible from the rest of the carapace, but never as obviously pale as in the nine-banded armadillo. Scutes on the movable bands are triangular in shape, but those on the main plates are rounded. The number of scutes present on the fourth movable band varies from 44 to 52, with a mean of 48.4. Seven-banded armadillo possesses a variety of unique biological and neurological features. Its brain is characterized by a strongly developed sense of smell, big olfactory bulbs, and big pyriform cortex, specialized for its carnivorous and nocturnal lifestyle. Furthermore, the species has a particularly large induseum griseum, a brain structure that relates to the olfactory system, which might prove it useful in neurobiological research.

== Reproduction ==
Females give birth to seven to nine genetically identical offspring.
