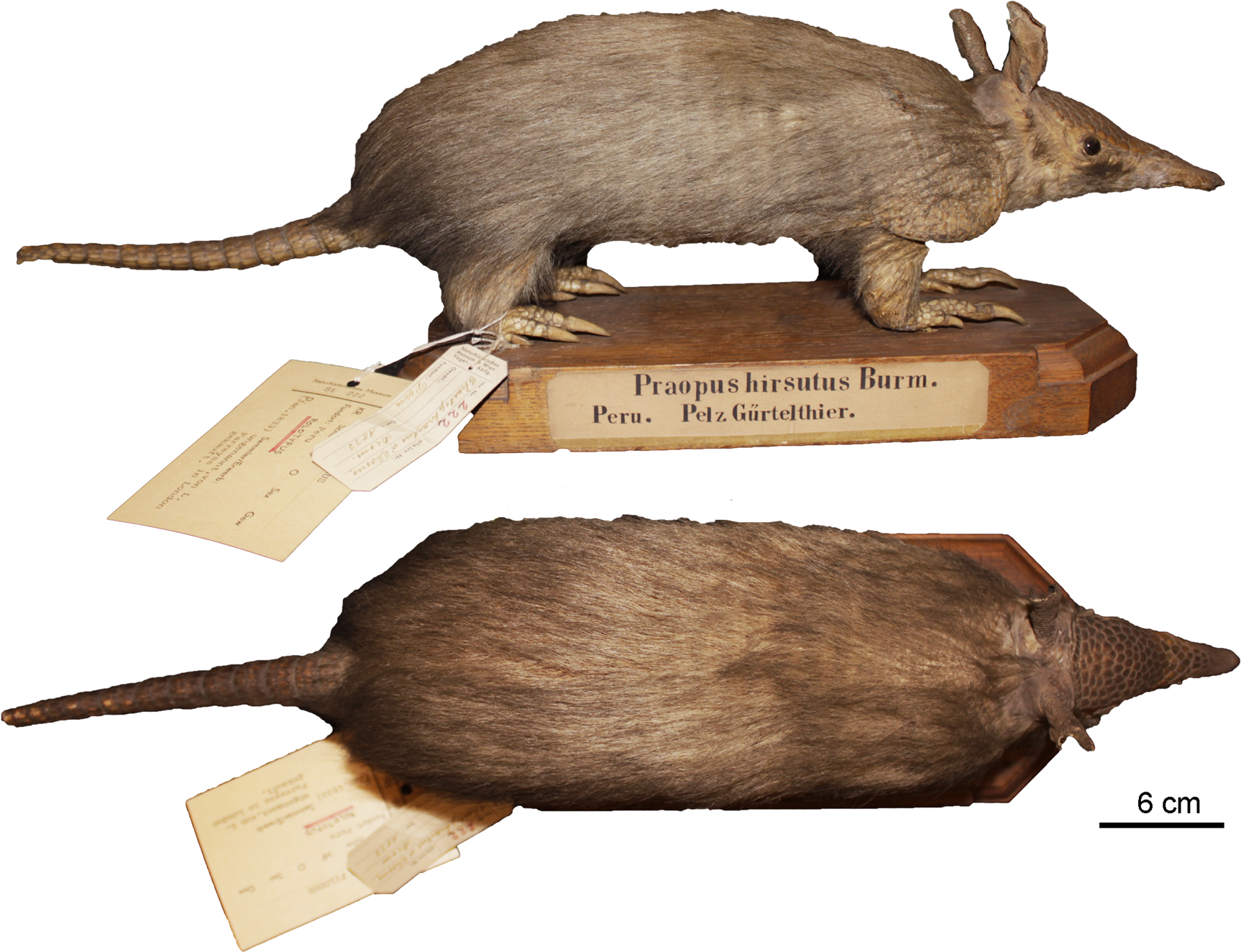

Conservation status
- Data Deficient (IUCN 3.1)

Scientific classification
- Kingdom: Animalia
- Phylum: Chordata
- Class: Mammalia
- Order: Cingulata
- Family: Dasypodidae
- Genus: Dasypus
- Species: D. pilosus

Binomial name
- Dasypus pilosus (Fitzinger, 1856)
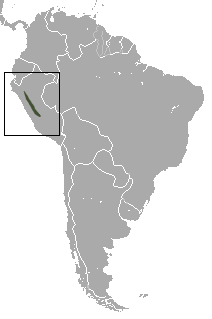
- Hairy long-nosed armadillo range

Synonyms
- Cryptophractus pilosus Fitzinger, 1856; Dasypus hirsutus (Burmeister, 1862)

= Hairy long-nosed armadillo =

Species of mammal

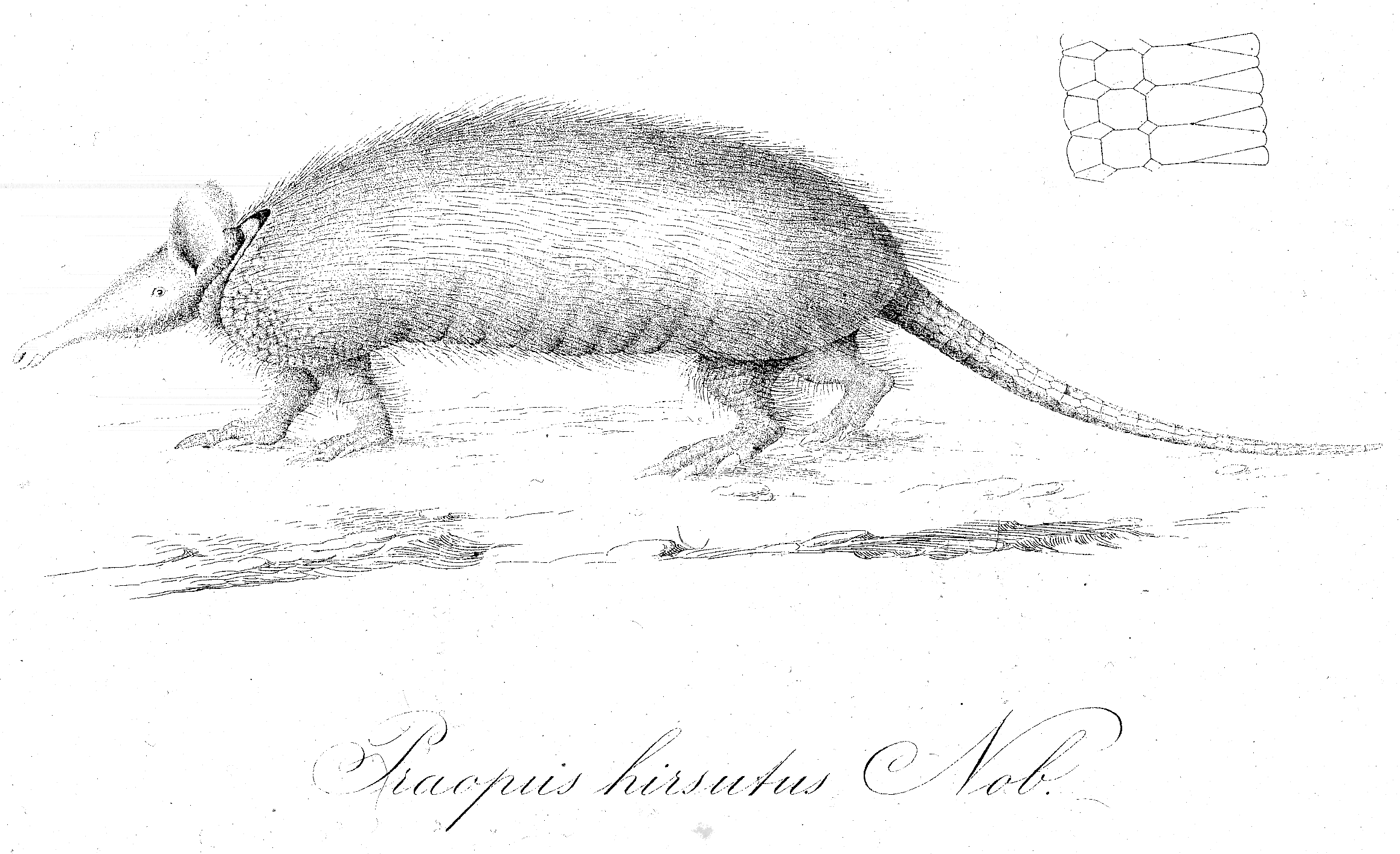
Drawing by Hermann Burmeister

The hairy long-nosed armadillo or woolly armadillo (Dasypus pilosus) is a species of armadillo in the family Dasypodidae. It is endemic to Peru. Its natural habitats are subtropical or tropical moist lowland forest and subtropical or tropical moist montane forest. The International Union for Conservation of Nature used to consider it a "vulnerable species" but has changed this assessment to "data deficient" because so little is known about the animal and the threats it faces.

== Description ==
The hairy long-nosed armadillo is poorly known. Like other species of Dasypus, it has a hard armour-like shell, called a carapace. The armour consists of ossified dermal plates composed of a number of movable bands covered by leathery skin. The rostrum is long and slender and is more than half the length of the head. There are long, hairless ears and a slender tail, tapering to a point. The front part of the tail is protected by keratinised rings of scales. The front feet have four strong claws and the hind feet five. It has a distinctive coat of long reddish-brown or grayish-brown fur which grows through tiny pores in its armour. It has similar bodily proportions to other armadillos but is unlikely to be confused with any other species. One male individual studied had a total length of 575 mm (23 in) including a tail of 252 mm (10 in).

== Distribution and habitat ==
This armadillo is endemic to Peru, where it is found on the eastern side of the Andes Mountains. It is present in the department of San Martín, where it may be found in Rio Abiseo National Park, and in the departments of La Libertad, Huánuco and Junín. It has also been reported in the department of Amazonas. Its habitat is the Yungas, a stretch of subtropical, deciduous and evergreen forests along the eastern slopes of the mountains. It seems to frequent dense undergrowth in limestone areas.
