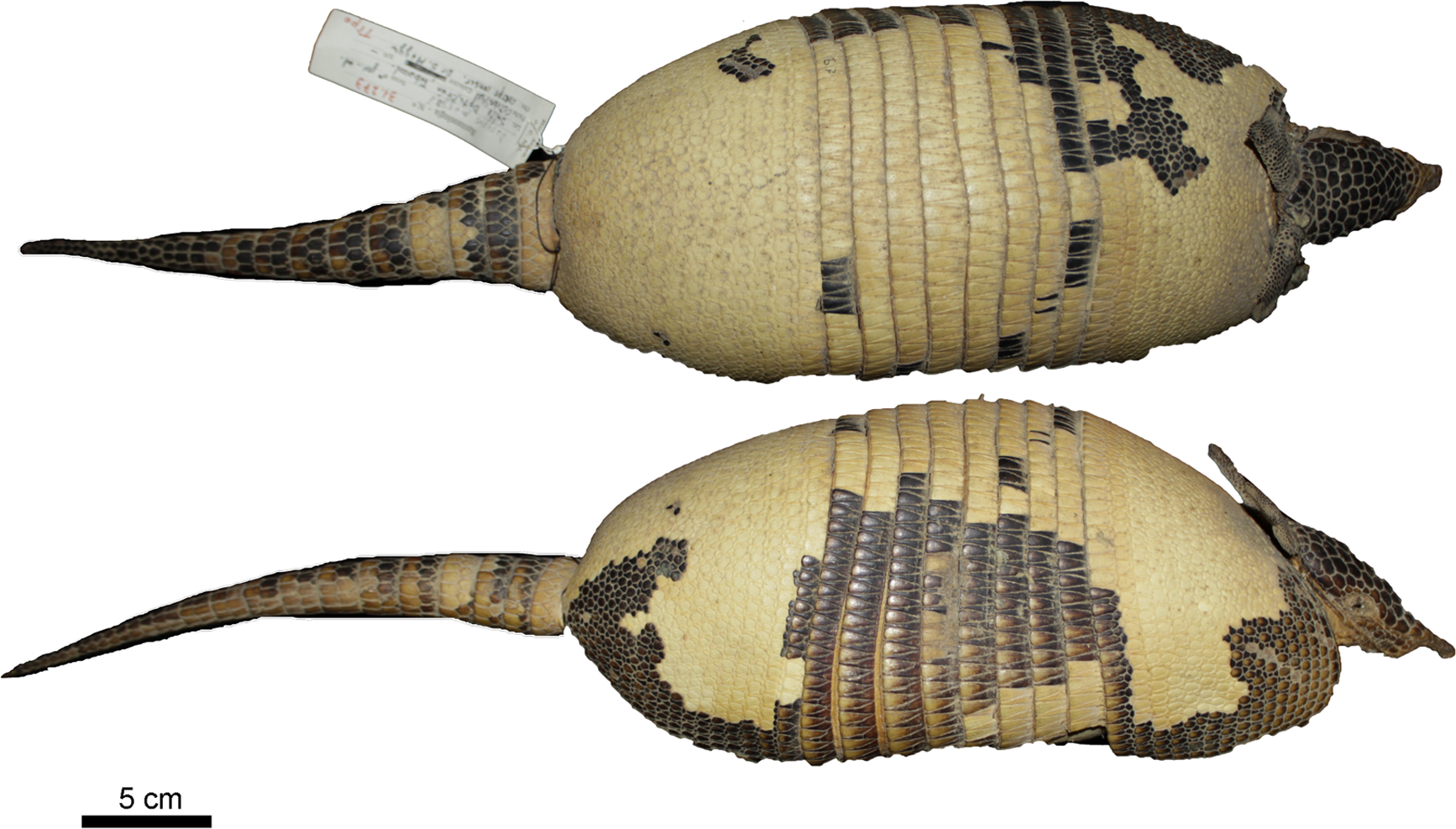

Conservation status
- Data Deficient (IUCN 3.1)

Scientific classification
- Kingdom: Animalia
- Phylum: Chordata
- Class: Mammalia
- Order: Cingulata
- Family: Dasypodidae
- Genus: Dasypus
- Species: D. mazzai

Binomial name
- Dasypus mazzai José Yepes, 1933
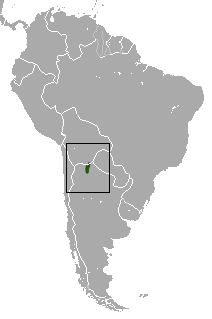
- Yepes's mulita range

Synonyms
- Dasypus yepesi

= Yepes's mulita =

Species of mammal

Yepes's mulita or the Yungas lesser long-nosed armadillo (Dasypus mazzai) is a species of armadillo in the family Dasypodidae. It is endemic to Argentina and Bolivia. Its natural habitat is subtropical dry forests. The species was renamed D. yepesi because the type of D. mazzai was suspected to correspond of other species of Dasypus, which it was later proved wrong, becoming D. yepesi a synonym of D. mazzai.

== Geographic range ==
Yepes's mulita is found in the Jujuy and Salta provinces of Argentina, however its range may extend to parts of Bolivia and Paraguay. Due to the lack of data on the species, no more than nine populations are known. It is mostly found in altitudes of 450–1800 m (1476–5905 ft). Its habitat ranges from deserts to humid forests.

== Use and trade ==
The species is known to be hunted locally for food.

== Conservation ==
Because so little is known about Yepes's mulita, it is listed as "Data Deficient" by the IUCN. There is ongoing deforestation in its range and its habitat is considered fragmented, which adds to the conservation concerns. The species has been designated for protection in Parque Nacional Calilegua and Parque Nacional El Rey in northern Argentina.
