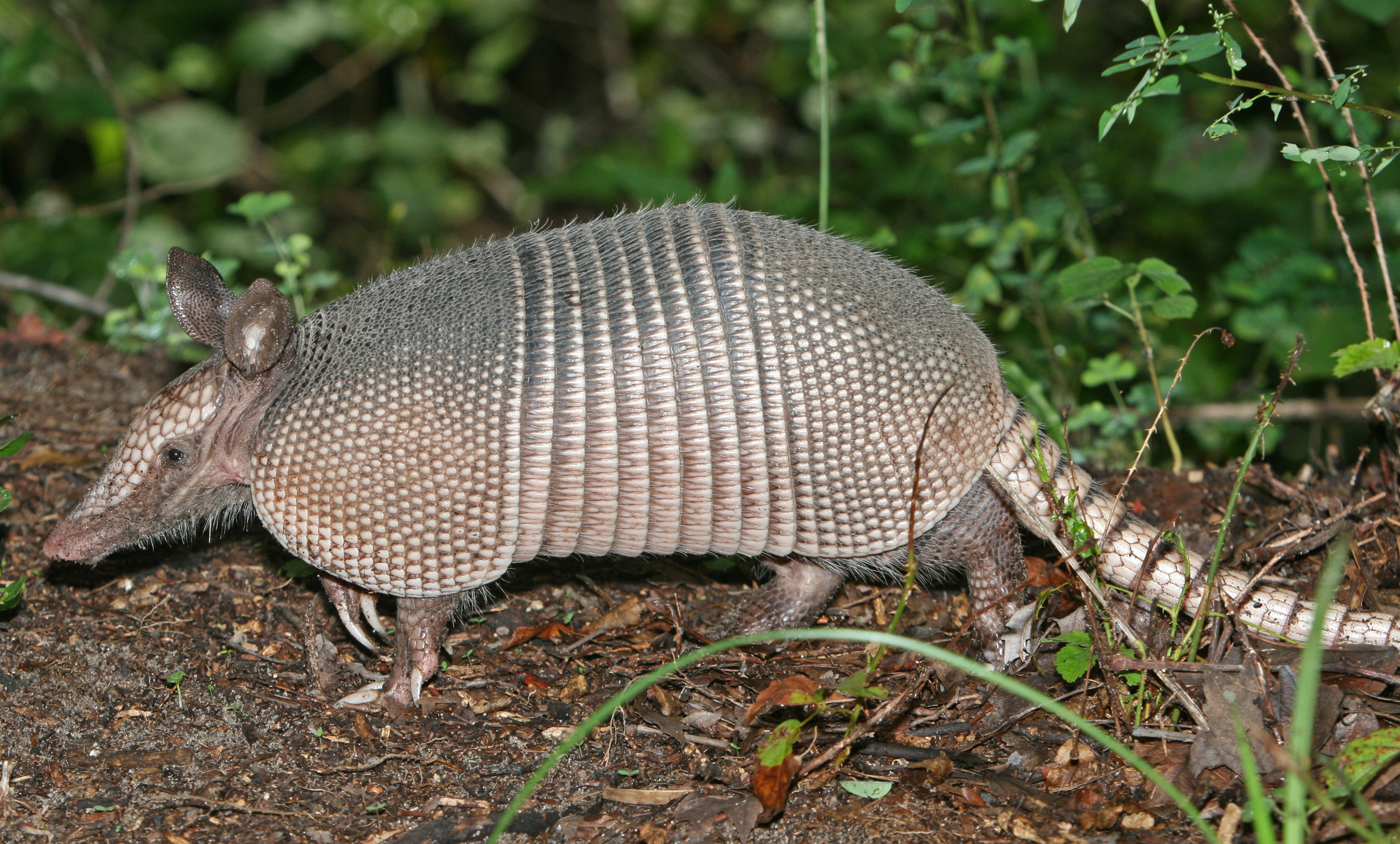

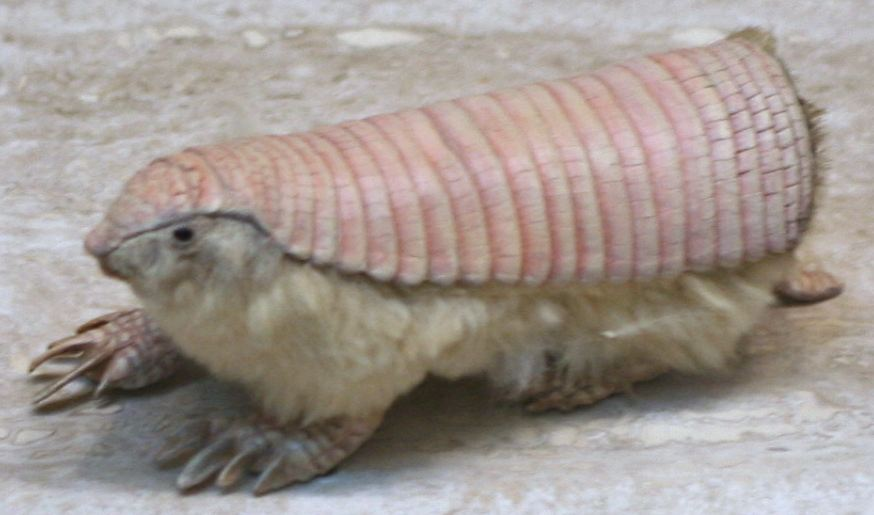
- From top to bottom: nine-banded armadillo (Dasypus novemcinctus), pink fairy armadillo (Chlamyphorus truncatus)

Scientific classification
- Kingdom: Animalia
- Phylum: Chordata
- Class: Mammalia
- Superorder: Xenarthra
- Order: Cingulata

Families
- Chlamyphoridae; Chlamyphorinae; Euphractinae; Tolypeutinae; †Glyptodontinae; Dasypodidae

Cladistically included but traditionally excluded taxa
- †Pampatheriinae; †Pucatheriidae; †Paracingulata Casali et al., 2026; †Palaeopeltidae; †Peltephilidae

= Armadillo =

Armadillo Temporal range: 58.7–0 Ma Late Paleocene – Recent

Placental mammals in the order Cingulata

Armadillo

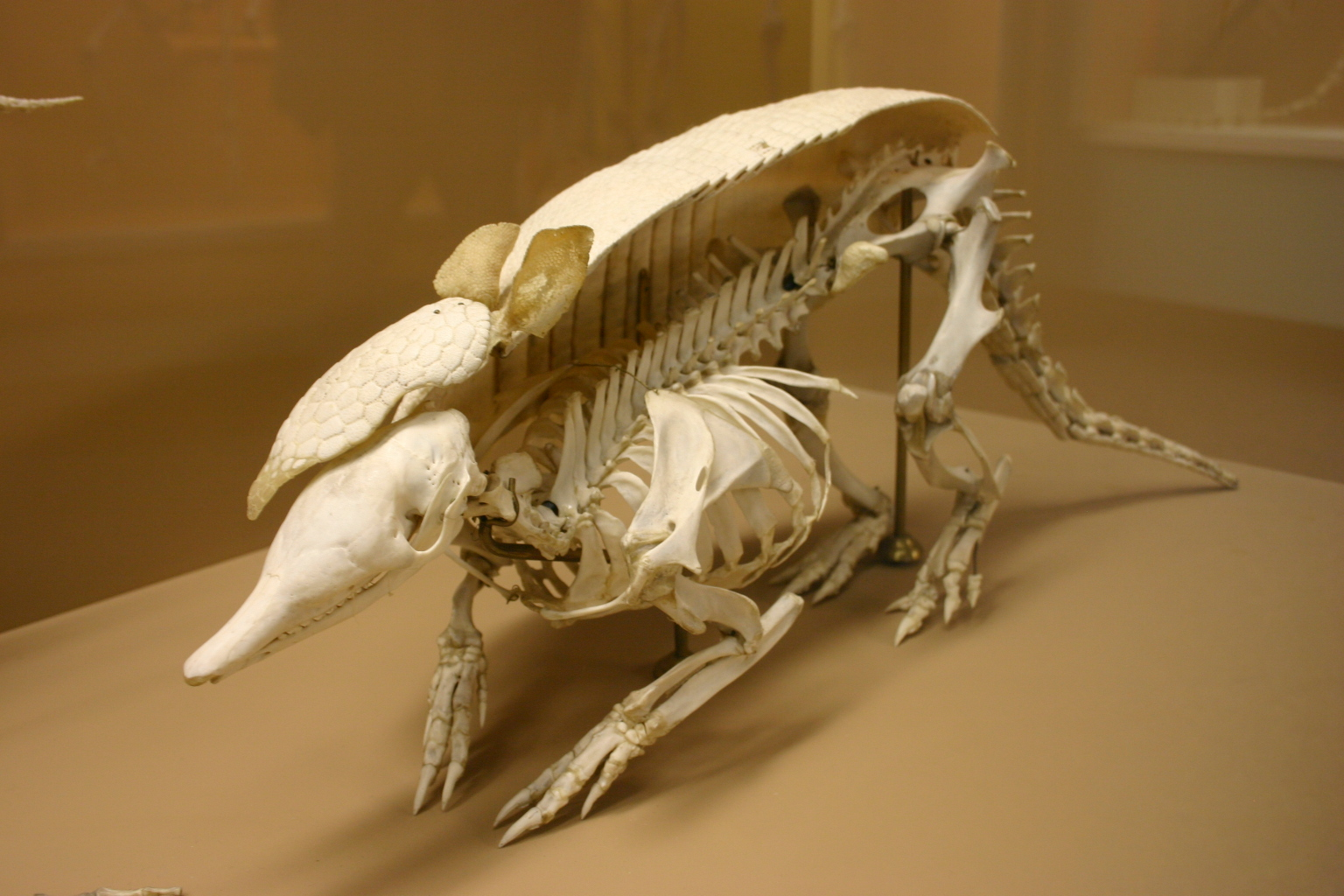
Nine-banded armadillo skeleton

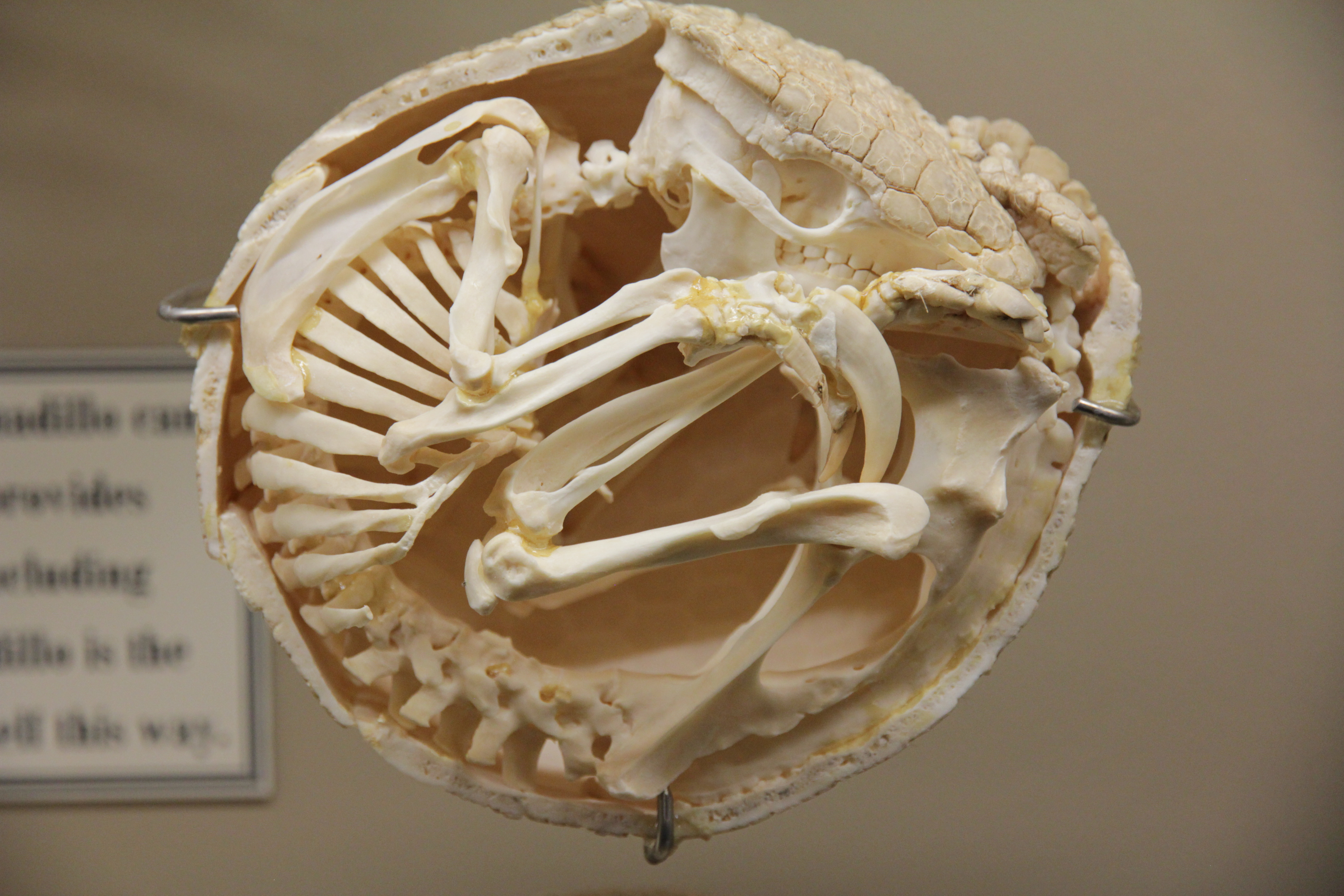
Three-banded armadillo skeleton on display at the Museum of Osteology

Armadillos (Spanish for 'little armored ones') are placental mammals in the order Cingulata. They form part of the superorder Xenarthra, along with the anteaters and sloths. Twenty-one extant species of armadillo have been described, some of which are distinguished by the number of bands on their armor. All species are native to the Americas, where they inhabit a variety of environments.

Living armadillos are characterized by a leathery armor shell and long, sharp claws for digging. They have short legs, but can move quite quickly. The average length of an armadillo is about 75 cm (30 in), including its tail. The giant armadillo grows up to 150 cm (59 in) and weighs up to 54 kg (119 lb), while the pink fairy armadillo has a length of only 13–15 cm (5–6 in). When threatened by a predator, Tolypeutes species frequently roll up into a ball; they are the only species of armadillo capable of this.

Recent genetic research has shown that the megafaunal glyptodonts (up to 1.5 metres (4.9 ft) tall with maximum body masses of around 2 tonnes), which became extinct around 12,000 years ago are true armadillos more closely related to all other living armadillos than to Dasypus (the long-nosed or naked-tailed armadillos). Armadillos are currently classified into two families, Dasypodidae, with Dasypus as the only living genus, and Chlamyphoridae, which contains all other living armadillos as well as the glyptodonts.

== Etymology ==
The word armadillo means 'little armored one' in Spanish; it is derived from armadura 'armor', with the diminutive suffix -illo attached. The Aztecs called them āyōtōchtli [aːjoːˈtoːt͡ʃt͡ɬi], Nahuatl for 'turtle-rabbit': āyōtl [ˈaːjoːt͡ɬ] 'turtle' and tōchtli [ˈtoːt͡ʃt͡ɬi] 'rabbit'. The Portuguese word for 'armadillo' is tatu which is derived from the Tupi language ta' 'bark, armor' and tu 'dense'; and used in Argentina, Bolivia, Brazil, Paraguay and Uruguay; similar names are also found in other, especially European, languages.

Other various vernacular names given are:

- quirquincho (from Quechua: kirkinchu) in Argentina, Bolivia, Chile, Colombia and Peru;
- cuzuco (from Nahuatl) in Costa Rica, El Salvador, Honduras and Nicaragua;
- mulita in Argentina and Uruguay;
- peludo in Argentina, Chile, Colombia and Uruguay;
- piche in Argentina, Brazil, Chile, Colombia and Paraguay;
- cachicamo in Colombia and Venezuela
- gurre in Tolima, Caldas and Antioquia, Colombia;
- jerre-jerre in Caribbean Colombia;
- jueche in southeast Mexico;
- toche in the state of Veracruz, Mexico;
- carachupa in Perú.

== Classification ==
Family Dasypodidae

- Subfamily Dasypodinae
  - Genus Dasypus
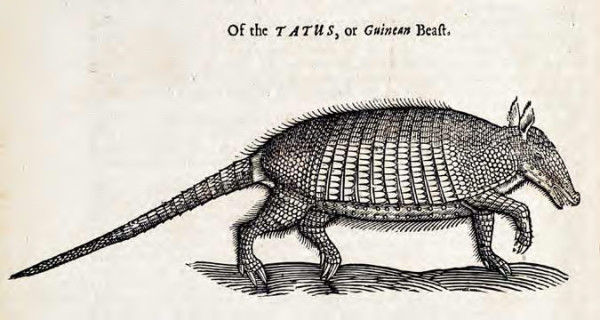
    1658 woodcut of an armadillo
    - Nine-banded armadillo or long-nosed armadillo, Dasypus novemcinctus
    - Mexican long-nosed armadillo Dasypus mexicanus
    - Seven-banded armadillo, Dasypus septemcinctus
    - Southern long-nosed armadillo, Dasypus hybridus
    - Llanos long-nosed armadillo, Dasypus sabanicola
    - Greater long-nosed armadillo, Dasypus kappleri
    - Hairy long-nosed armadillo, Dasypus pilosus
    - Yepes's mulita, Dasypus yepesi
    - †Beautiful armadillo, Dasypus bellus
    - †Dasypus neogaeus
  - Genus †Stegotherium

Family Chlamyphoridae

- Subfamily Chlamyphorinae
  - Genus Calyptophractus
    - Greater fairy armadillo, Calyptophractus retusus
  - Genus Chlamyphorus
    - Pink fairy armadillo, Chlamyphorus truncatus
- Subfamily Euphractinae
  - Genus Chaetophractus
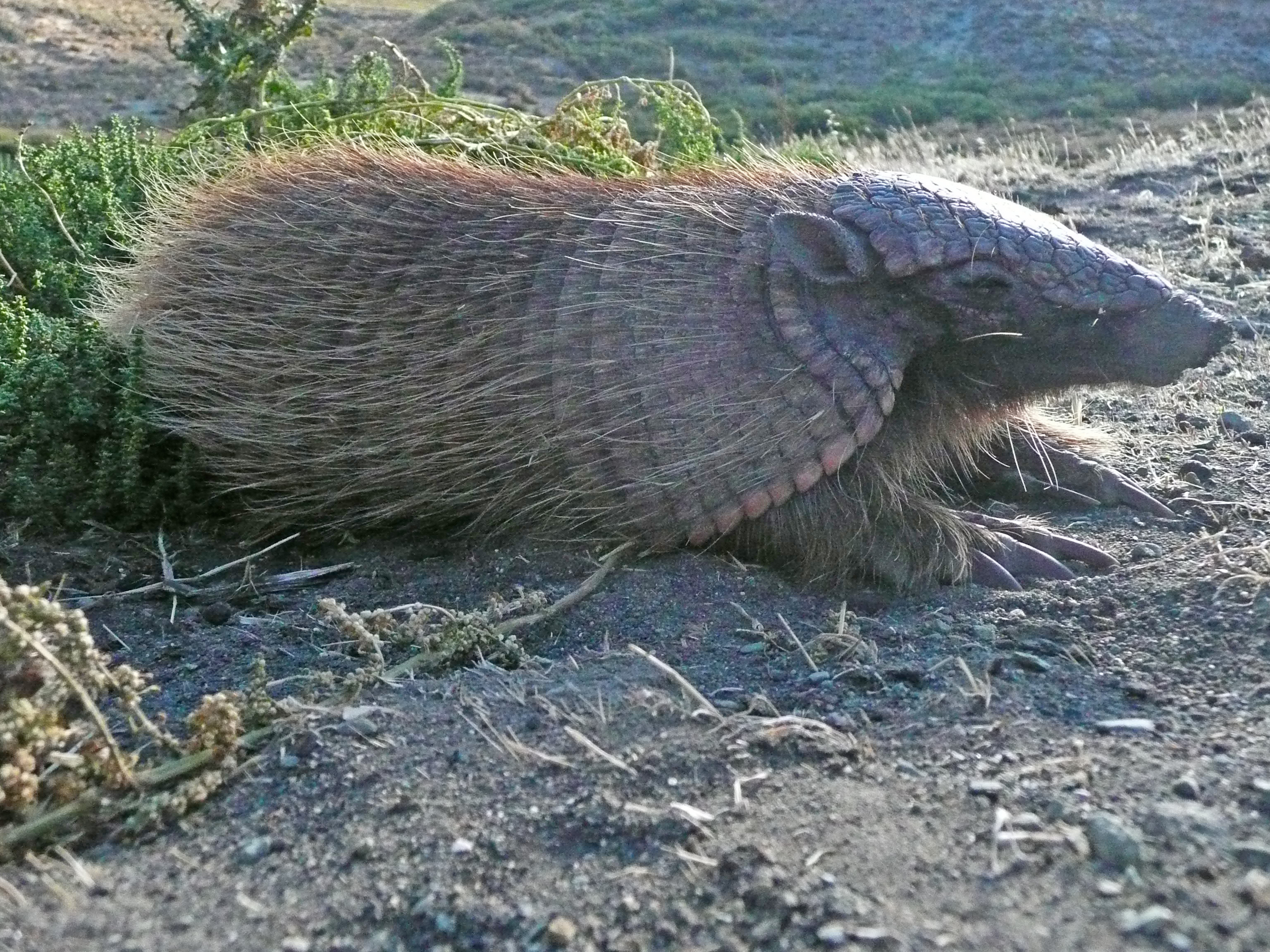
    Screaming hairy armadillo
    - Screaming hairy armadillo, Chaetophractus vellerosus
    - Big hairy armadillo, Chaetophractus villosus
    - Andean hairy armadillo, Chaetophractus nationi
  - Genus †Macroeuphractus
  - Genus †Paleuphractus
  - Genus †Proeuphractus
  - Genus †Doellotatus
  - Genus †Peltephilus
    - †Horned armadillo, Peltephilus ferox
  - Genus Euphractus
    - Six-banded armadillo, Euphractus sexcinctus
  - Genus Zaedyus
    - Pichi, Zaedyus pichiy
- Subfamily Tolypeutinae
  - Genus †Kuntinaru
  - Genus Cabassous
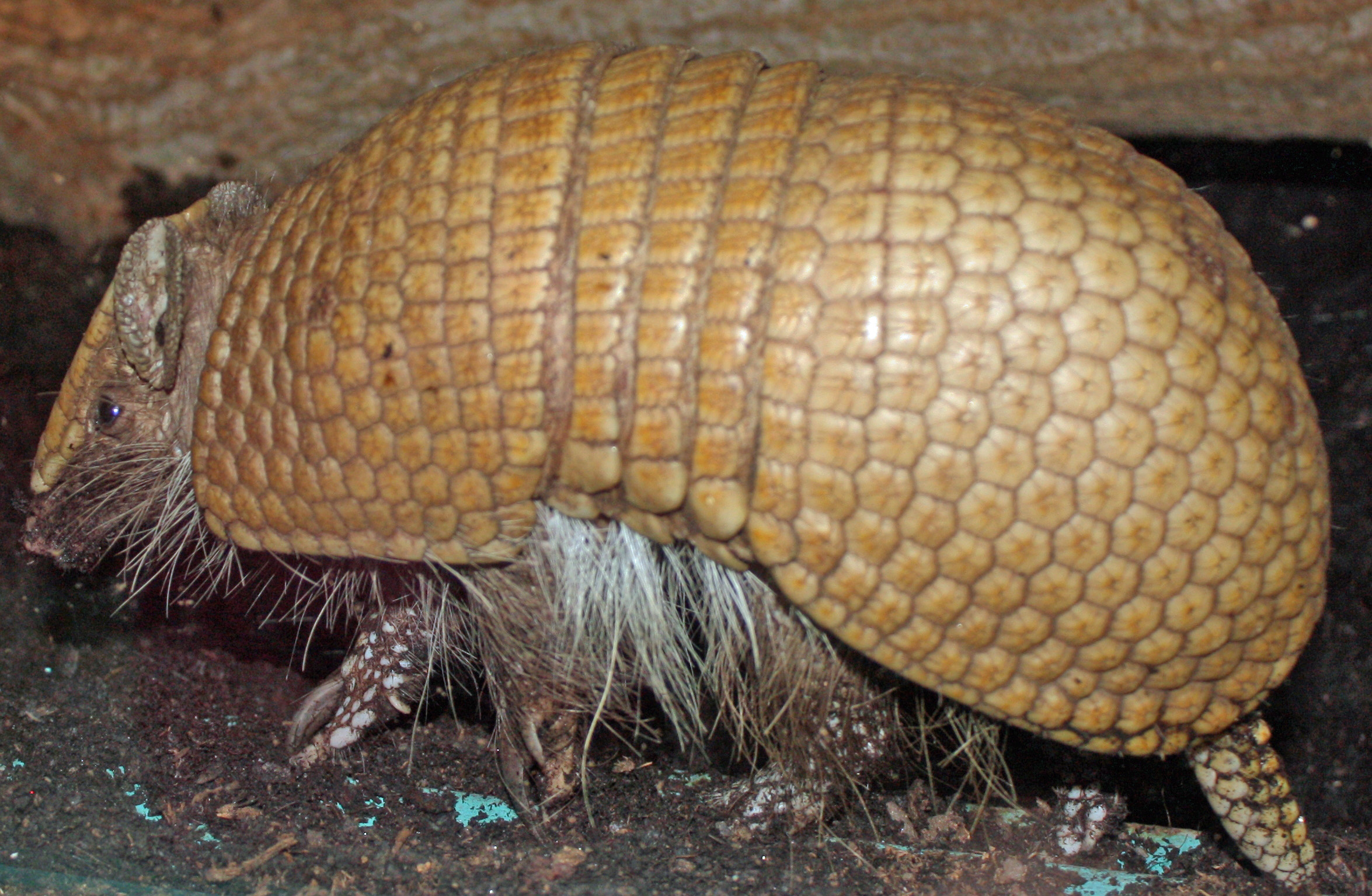
    Southern three-banded armadillo
    - Northern naked-tailed armadillo, Cabassous centralis
    - Chacoan naked-tailed armadillo, Cabassous chacoensis
    - Southern naked-tailed armadillo, Cabassous unicinctus
    - Greater naked-tailed armadillo, Cabassous tatouay
  - Genus Priodontes
    - Giant armadillo, Priodontes maximus
  - Genus Tolypeutes
    - Southern three-banded armadillo, Tolypeutes matacus
    - Brazilian three-banded armadillo, Tolypeutes tricinctus

† indicates extinct taxon

== Evolution ==
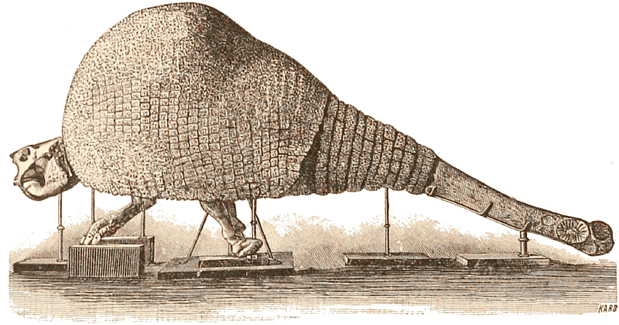
Illustration of the skeleton of the glyptodont Doedicurus

The earliest armadillos appeared in South America during the early Eocene epoch, around 52–55 million years ago. The modern groups of armadillos are thought to have diverged from each other in the Eocene. Recent morphological and genetic evidence indicates that the large glyptodonts and pampatheres, both of which went extinct as part of the end-Pleistocene extinction event around 12,000 years ago, are nested within the diversity of living armadillos. Below is a recent simplified phylogeny of the Cingulata based on genetics and analysis of the inner ear. The dagger symbol, "†", denotes extinct groups.

- Cingulata
  - Dasypodidae
  - - Euphractinae
    - - Chlamyphorinae
      - Tolypeutinae
      - - †Pampatheres
        - †Glyptodonts

== Distribution ==
Like all of the Xenarthra lineages, armadillos originated in South America. Due to the continent's former isolation, they were confined there for most of the Cenozoic. The recent formation of the Isthmus of Panama allowed a few members of the family to migrate northward into southern North America by the early Pleistocene, as part of the Great American Interchange. (Some of their much larger cingulate relatives, the pampatheres and chlamyphorid glyptodonts, made the same journey.)

Today, all extant armadillo species are still present in South America. They are particularly diverse in Paraguay (where 11 species exist) and surrounding areas. Many species are endangered. Some, including four species of Dasypus, are widely distributed over the Americas, whereas others, such as Yepes's mulita, are restricted to small ranges. Two species, the northern naked-tailed armadillo and nine-banded armadillo, are found in Central America; the latter has also reached the United States, primarily in the south-central states (notably Texas), but with a range that extends as far east as North Carolina and Florida, and as far north as southern Nebraska, Indiana and Ohio. Their range has consistently expanded in North America over the last century due to a lack of natural predators. Nine-banded armadillos are increasingly documented in southern Illinois and are tracking northwards due to climate change.

== Characteristics ==
=== Size ===
The smallest species of armadillo, the pink fairy armadillo, weighs around 85 g (3.0 oz) and is 13–15 cm (5.1–5.9 in) in total length. The largest species, the giant armadillo, can weigh up to 54 kg (119 lb), and can be 150 cm (59 in) long.

=== Body temperature ===
In common with other xenarthrans, armadillos, in general, have low body temperatures of 33–36 °C (91–97 °F) and low basal metabolic rates (40–60% of that expected in placental mammals of their mass). This is particularly true of types that specialize in using termites as their primary food source (for example, Priodontes and Tolypeutes).

=== Skin ===
The armor is formed by plates of dermal bone covered in relatively small overlapping epidermal scales called "scutes" which are composed of keratin. The scutes are held together by collagen fibres that can contract to curve following the armadillo's body shape. The skin of an armadillo can glow under ultraviolet light. Most species have rigid shields over the shoulders and hips, with a number of bands separated by flexible skin covering the back and flanks. Additional armor covers the top of the head, the upper parts of the limbs, and the tail. The underside of the animal is never armored and is simply covered with soft skin and fur. This armor-like skin appears to be an important defense for many armadillos, although most escape predators by fleeing (often into thorny patches, from which their armor protects them) or digging to safety. Only the South American three-banded armadillos (Tolypeutes) rely heavily on their armor for protection.

== Behaviour ==
=== Diet and predation ===
The diets of different armadillo species vary, but consist mainly of insects, grubs, and other invertebrates. Some species, however, feed almost entirely on ants and termites.

They are prolific diggers. Many species use their sharp claws to dig for food, such as grubs, and to dig dens. The nine-banded armadillo prefers to build burrows in moist soil near the creeks, streams, and arroyos around which it lives and feeds.

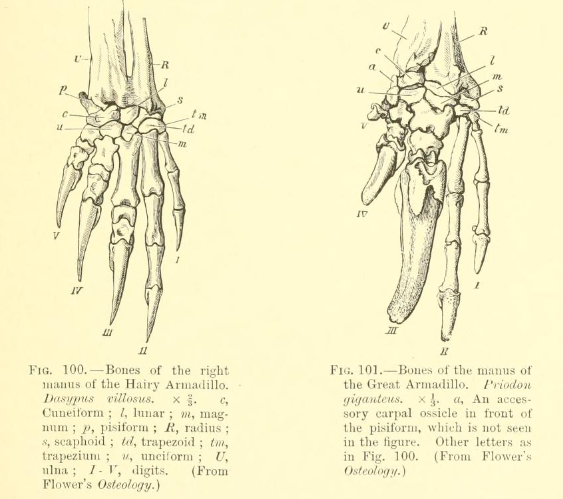
Paws of a hairy and a giant armadillo

Armadillos have very poor eyesight, and use their keen sense of smell to hunt for food. They use their claws not only for digging and finding food but also for digging burrows for their dwellings, each of which is a single corridor the width of the animal's body. They have five clawed toes on their hind feet, and three to five toes with heavy digging claws on their fore feet. Armadillos have numerous cheek teeth which are not divided into premolars and molars, but usually have no incisors or canines. The dentition of the nine-banded armadillo is P 7/7, M 1/1 = 32.

=== Defense ===
When threatened by a predator, Tolypeutes species frequently roll up into a ball. Other armadillo species cannot roll up because they have too many plates. When surprised, the North American nine-banded armadillo tends to jump straight in the air, which can lead to a fatal collision with the undercarriage or fenders of passing vehicles.

Only the three-banded armadillo can fully curl into a hard ball, because it can contort its shell by curling its head and back feet inward.

=== Movement ===
Armadillos have short legs, but can move quite quickly. The nine-banded armadillo is noted for its movement through water, which is accomplished via two different methods: it can walk underwater for short distances, holding its breath for as long as six minutes; or, to cross larger bodies of water, it can increase its buoyancy by swallowing air to inflate its stomach and intestines.

=== Reproduction ===
Gestation lasts from 60 to 120 days, depending on species, although the nine-banded armadillo also exhibits delayed implantation, so the young are not typically born for eight months after mating. Most members of the genus Dasypus give birth to four monozygotic young (that is, identical quadruplets), but other species may have typical litter sizes that range from one to eight. The young are born with soft, leathery skin which hardens within a few weeks. They reach sexual maturity in three to twelve months, depending on the species. Armadillos are solitary animals that do not share their burrows with other adults.

== Armadillos and humans ==
=== Science and education ===
Armadillos are often used in the study of leprosy, since they, along with mangabey monkeys, rabbits, and mice (on their footpads), are among the few known species that can contract the disease systemically. They are particularly susceptible due to their unusually low body temperature, which is hospitable to the leprosy bacterium, Mycobacterium leprae. (The leprosy bacterium is difficult to culture and armadillos have a body temperature of 34 °C (93 °F), similar to human skin.) Humans can acquire a leprosy infection from armadillos by handling them or consuming armadillo meat. Armadillos are a presumed vector and natural reservoir for the disease in Texas, Louisiana and Florida. Prior to the arrival of Europeans in the late 15th century, leprosy was unknown in the New World. Given that armadillos are native to the New World, at some point they must have acquired the disease from old-world humans.

The armadillo is also a natural reservoir for Chagas disease.

The nine-banded armadillo also serves science through its unusual reproductive system, in which four genetically identical offspring are born, the result of one original egg. Because they are always genetically identical, the group of four young provides a good subject for scientific, behavioral, or medical tests that need consistent biological and genetic makeup in the test subjects. This is the only reliable manifestation of polyembryony in the class Mammalia, and exists only within the genus Dasypus and not in all armadillos, as is commonly believed. Other species that display this trait include parasitoid wasps, certain flatworms, and various aquatic invertebrates.

Even though they have a leathery, tough shell, armadillos (mainly Dasypus) are common roadkill due to their habit of jumping 3–4 ft vertically when startled, which puts them into collision with the underside of vehicles. Wildlife enthusiasts are using the northward march of the armadillo as an opportunity to educate others about the animals, which can be a burrowing nuisance to property owners and managers.

=== Culture ===
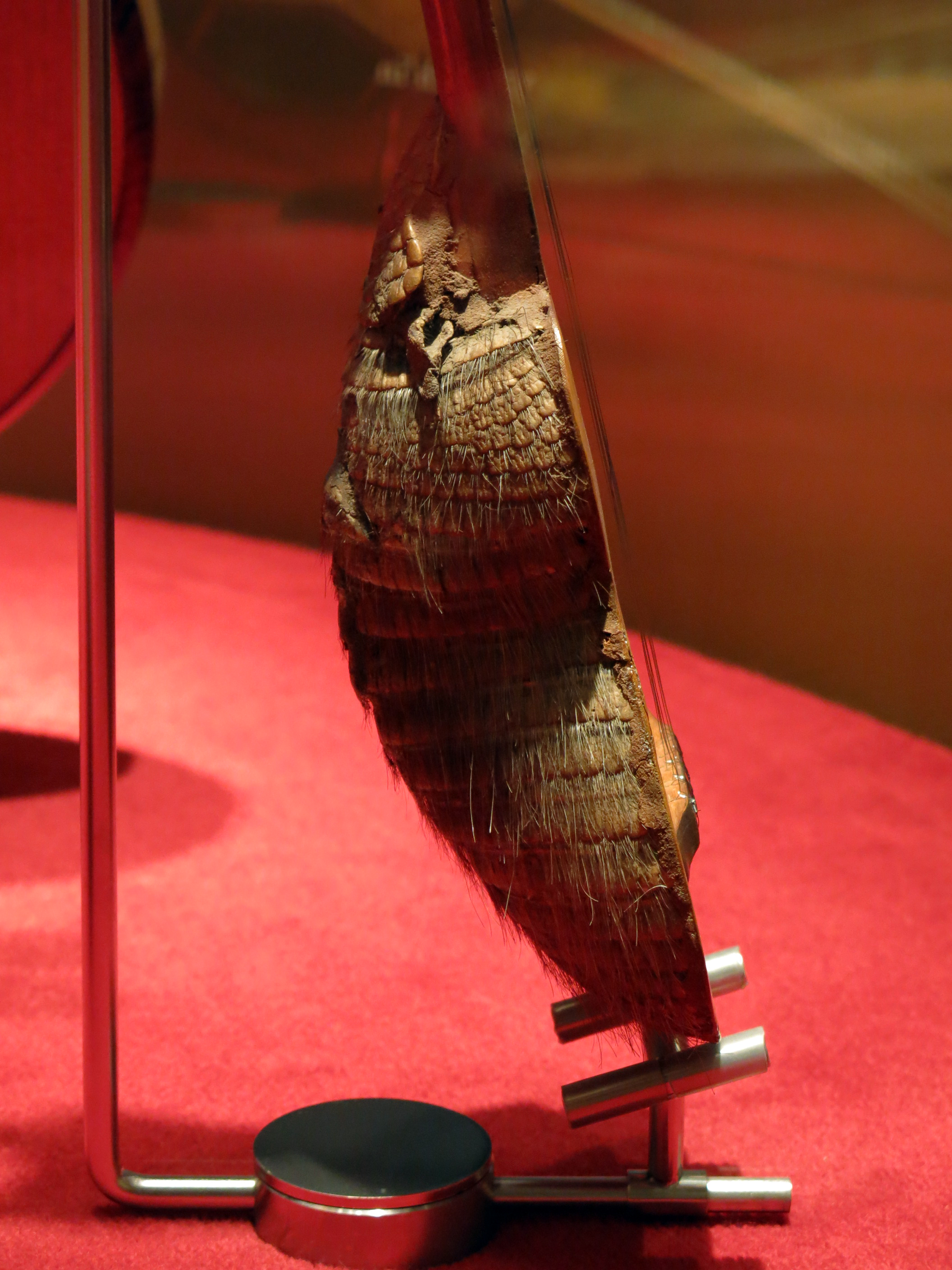
A traditional charango made of armadillo, today superseded by wooden charangos, in Museu de la Música de Barcelona

Armadillo shells have traditionally been used to make the back of the charango, an Andean lute instrument.

In certain parts of Central and South America, armadillo meat is eaten; it is a popular ingredient in Oaxaca, Mexico. During the Great Depression, Americans were known to eat armadillo, known begrudgingly as "Hoover hogs", a nod to the belief that President Herbert Hoover was responsible for the economic despair facing the nation at that time.

A whimsical account of "The Beginning of the Armadillos" is one of the chapters of Rudyard Kipling's Just So Stories 1902 children's book. The vocal and piano duo Flanders and Swann recorded a humorous song called "The Armadillo".

Shel Silverstein wrote a two-line poem called "Instructions" on how to bathe an armadillo in his collection A Light in the Attic. The reference was "use one bar of soap, a whole lot of hope, and 72 pads of Brillo."

== See also ==
- Armadillo shoe
- Echidnas, a type of monotreme with a defensive keratin body covering
- Hedgehogs, another mammal group with defensive keratin body coverings
- Pangolins, another mammal group with defensive keratin body coverings
- Porcupines, another mammal group with defensive keratin body coverings
