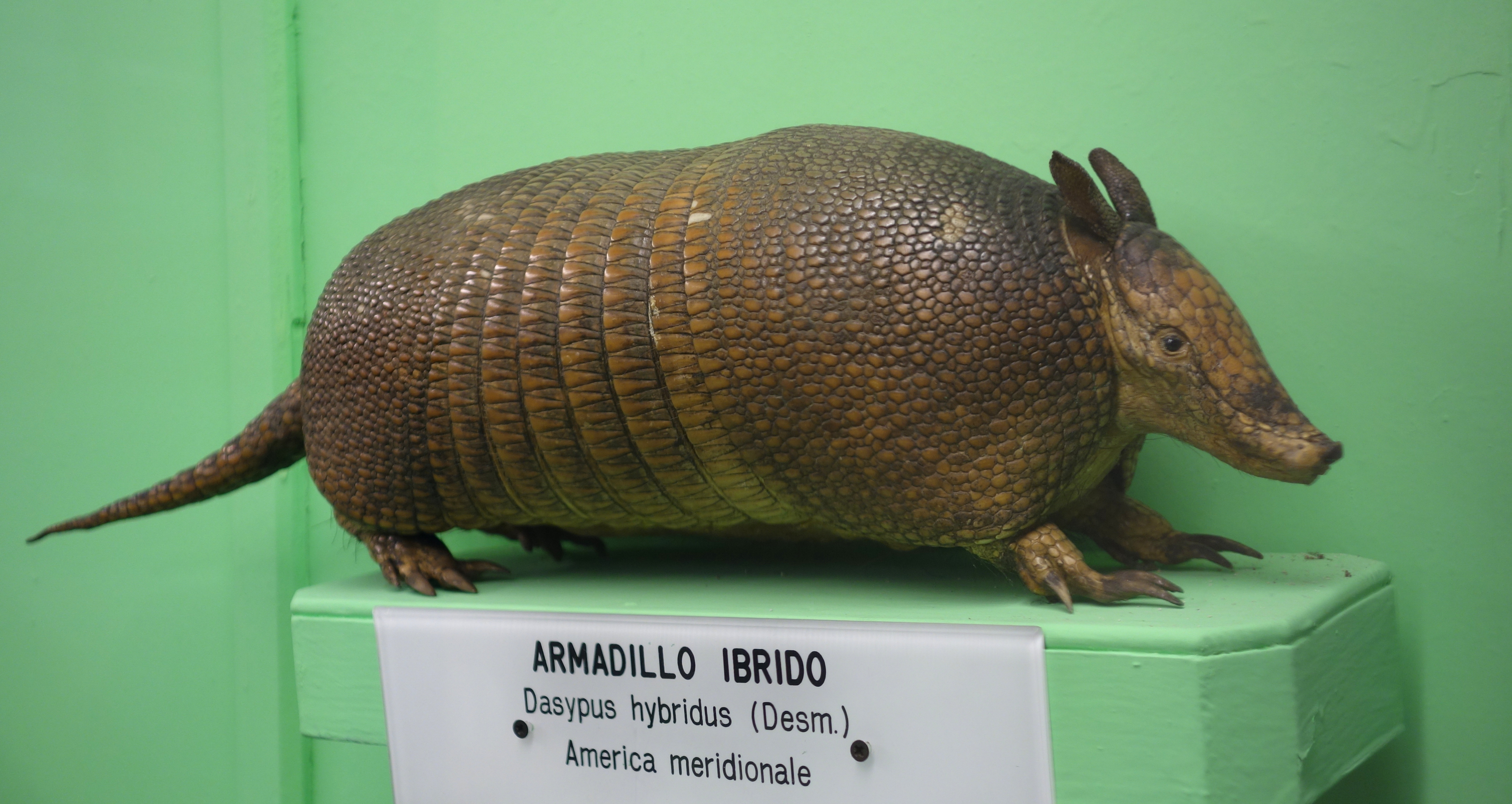
- Model at the Museo Civico di Storia Naturale Giacomo Doria

Conservation status
- Near Threatened (IUCN 3.1)

Scientific classification
- Kingdom: Animalia
- Phylum: Chordata
- Class: Mammalia
- Order: Cingulata
- Family: Dasypodidae
- Genus: Dasypus
- Species: D. hybridus

Binomial name
- Dasypus hybridus (Desmarest, 1804)
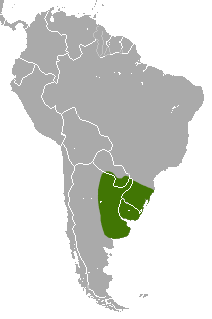
- Southern long-nosed armadillo range

= Southern long-nosed armadillo =

Species of mammal

The southern long-nosed armadillo (Dasypus hybridus) is a species of armadillo native to South America.

== Description ==
Among the smallest of the long-nosed armadillos, individuals of the southern species measure about 30 cm (12 in) in head-body length, with a tail about 17 cm (6.7 in) long. With no discernible sexual dimorphism, both males and females weigh about 2 kg (4.4 lb). The upper body, tail, and upper surface of the head are covered by a dark grey carapace of bony scales and have very little hair. The central part of the carapace is divided into a number of movable bands; there are usually seven such bands, but many individuals have just six, while a few have eight. The scales on the main shields, over the shoulders and hips, are hexagonal and about 5 mm (0.20 in) across, while those on the bands are rectangular and marked with a V-shaped groove that divides them into three triangular sections. The scales on the head are variable in shape.

The tail has a number of distinct rings for about two-thirds of its length, and a slender tip. They have a narrow snout and long ears, measuring about a quarter to a third of the length of the head. There are four toes on the front feet and five on the hind feet; all have powerful curved claws. The underside of the animal has sparse dark-brown hair, and skin that is wrinkled on the abdomen, but smoother on the inside of the legs.

== Distribution and habitat ==
The southern long-nosed armadillo inhabits southern Brazil, in the states of Paraná, Rio Grande do Sul, and Santa Catarina, southern Paraguay, north-eastern Argentina, and almost the whole of Uruguay. There are no recognised subspecies. Within this region, they live in grasslands up to 2,300 m (7,500 ft) in elevation, preferring relatively undisturbed habitats and avoiding agricultural cropland, although they may be found on cattle ranches.

== Behaviour and biology ==
About 60% of the species' diet consists of ants and termites, although they also eat other small invertebrates, the occasional small mouse, and some vegetables and scraps. They are diurnal and active throughout the year, being solitary outside of the breeding season.

They spend the night in burrows, which consist of a single passage with an average length of 120 cm (47 in) and depth of 43 cm (17 in), although individual burrows vary greatly. They are typically built on flat or gently sloping terrain and angled so that the entrance faces away from the prevailing winds. The entrance is usually concealed beneath bushes or rocks, and may be lined with dried plant matter, which is also often found deeper within the burrow, where it forms a nest.

Breeding begins in March, with the young being born from October to early December. From six to ten young are born in each litter, and are relatively precocial at birth, with their eyes already open and the bony scutes of their carapace already partially developed. Newborn young weigh about 48 g (1.7 oz), and are weaned at about two months.
