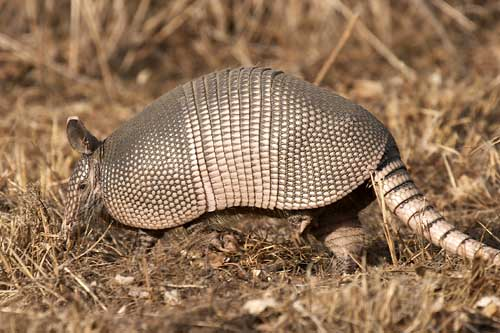
- Dasypus novemcinctus

Scientific classification
- Kingdom: Animalia
- Phylum: Chordata
- Class: Mammalia
- Order: Cingulata
- Family: Dasypodidae
- Subfamily: Dasypodinae
- Genus: Dasypus; Linnaeus, 1758

Type species
- Dasypus novemcinctus Linnaeus, 1758

Species
- †D. bellus; D. beniensis; D. hybridus; D. kappleri; D. mazzai; †D. neogaeus; D. novemcinctus; D. pilosus; D. sabanicola; D. septemcinctus
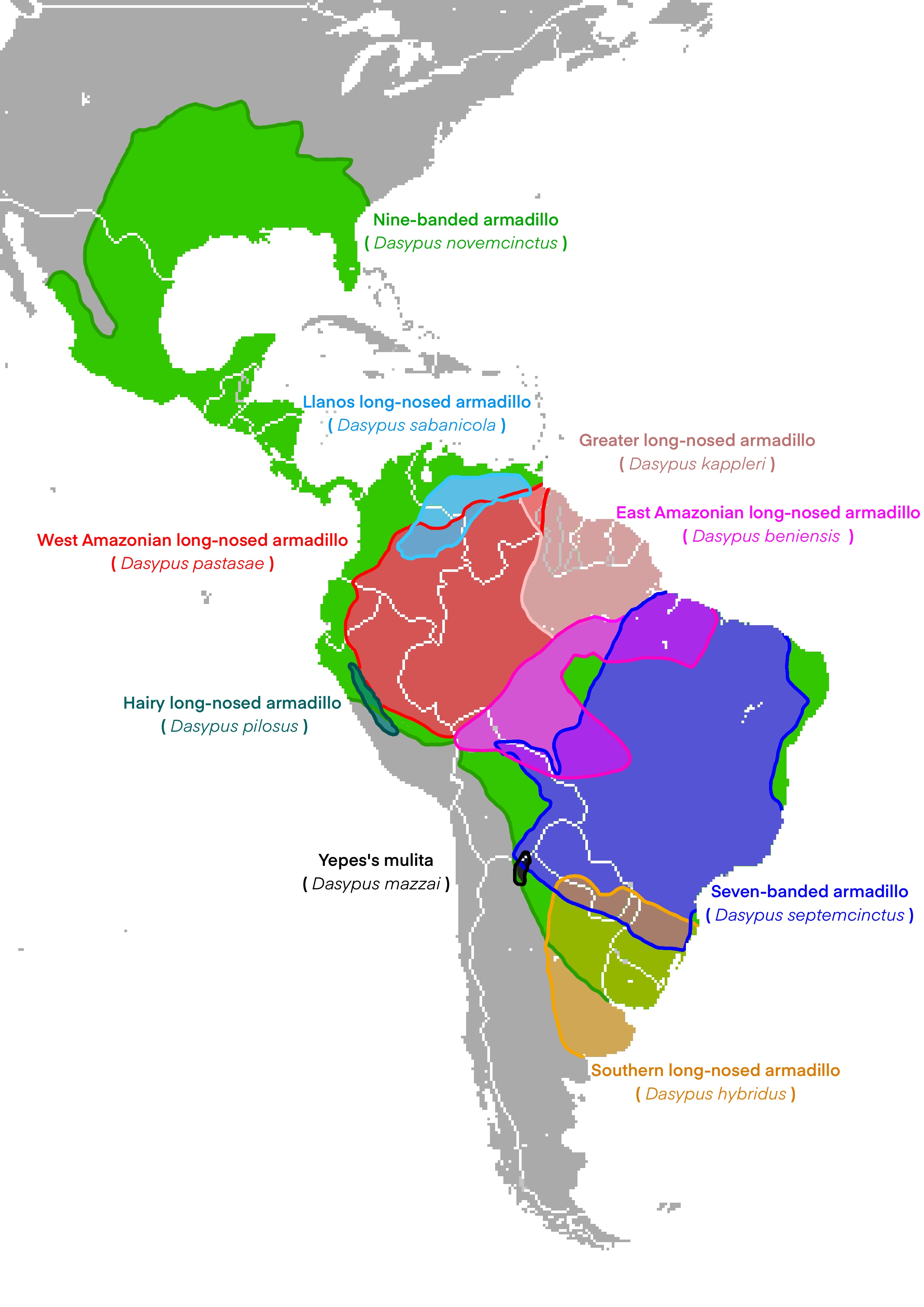

Synonyms
- Hyperoambon Peters, 1864

= Dasypus =

Dasypus Temporal range: Late Miocene-Recent, 9–0 Ma

Genus of mammals belonging to the armadillo order of xenarthrans

Dasypus is the only extant genus in the family Dasypodidae. Its species are known as long-nosed or naked-tailed armadillos. They are found in South, Central, and North America, as well as on the Caribbean islands of Grenada, Trinidad and Tobago. Members of Dasypus are solitary and primarily nocturnal to avoid temperature extremes and predation. They exist in numerous habitats ranging from brush to grassland areas and are mainly insectivorous. The name is derived from the Ancient Greek words δασύς (dasús), meaning "hair", and πούς (poús), meaning "foot".

The most common and widespread of the Dasypus species is the nine-banded armadillo (Dasypus novemcintus), which is commonly used in the study of leprosy due to its unique ability to contract the disease.

== Description ==
Dasypus are xenarthran mammals known for their hard armor-like shell, called a carapace. Their ossified dermal plates compose a series of six to eleven movable bands covered by leathery keratinous skin, which surrounds and protects the body. A thin epidermal layer separates each of the armor bands, and joints in the shell allow for flexibility. The face, neck, and underside lack a bony covering and are instead covered with small bunches of hair.

Dasypus species are grey or brown in color and possess long and sharp claws for scavenging and digging burrows. Although they have a very diverse range, armadillos are typically found near bodies of water, and their burrows are often dug into stream banks, tree stumps, or rock or brush piles.

When threatened, armadillos run to the nearest burrow or crevice and tightly wedge themselves inside with their back alongside the wall. If no such burrow or shelter is available, armadillos curl up to protect their vulnerable underside. Dasypus species are unable to roll into a complete ball like the Brazilian three-banded armadillo due to their excessive number of dermal plates.

Because they lack significant hair covering, armadillos are particularly sensitive to climate and are therefore most active during summer nights and winter days. Due to their low fat storage, they spend most of their activity foraging for food, which primarily consists of insects, small reptiles, and amphibians, and plants. Armadillos have a small, flattened skull with a long lower jaw and narrow snout. They do have small, rudimentary teeth, but lack incisors, canines, and enamel. Their tongue is particularly long and sticky and is used to forage for ants and termites. They have very poor eyesight and instead rely on their keen sense of smell and enhanced hearing to locate buried insects and detect predators.

Armadillos are fully capable of climbing, swimming, and jumping. Dasypus have a unique ability to build up an oxygen debt and hold their breath for up to six minutes. This allows them to cross streams and ponds underwater by simply walking or running along the bottom. If the water body is too large for this, Dasypus can instead gulp in air, inflating their stomachs and intestines and increasing buoyancy. This allows them to float and more easily swim across the water.

== Taxonomy and distribution ==
Dasypus are non-territorial, have large progeny, have few predators, and are capable of living in various environments, thus accounting for their large distribution. They are, though, limited by a lack of sufficient insects as a food source and their low metabolic rate, which prevents them from living in cold climates. Dasypus originated from South America but has expanded and diversified across numerous countries. The existence of human developments and construction has generally increased the armadillo's ability to expand by facilitating the crossing of previous obstacles. As of 2011, within the United States, they have not yet migrated south due to the lack of rainfall or water availability.

Cladogram of living Dasypus

- Dasypus
  - D. (Hyperoambon)
    - D. kappleri
  - D. (Dasypus)
    - - D. septemcinctus
      - D. hybridus
    - - - D. mazzai
        - D. sabanicola
      - - D. novemcinctus
        - D. pilosus

There are currently seven recognized extant Dasypus species:

Image	Scientific name	Common name	Description	Distribution
	D. hybridus	Southern long-nosed armadillo or southern lesser long-nosed armadillo	Like many Dasypus species, the exact limits of its range are uncertain due to morphological similarities. It weighs about 1–2 kg (2.2–4.4 lb) and is one of the few Dasypus species considered to be near threatened due to significant habitat loss and hunting.	Eastern Paraguay, southern Brazil, Argentina, and Uruguay
	D. kappleri	Greater long-nosed armadillo	A larger species at 8–10 kg (18–22 lb) and distinguished by spurs located on its hind legs. It is one of the few Dasypus species that gives birth to two young instead of four. There are two subspecies: D. k. kappleri and D. k. pastasae.	Venezuela, Ecuador, Guyana, Suriname, French Guiana, Peru, Bolivia, and Brazil
Dasypus pilosus - Feijo et al 2018 holotype	D. pilosus	Hairy long-nosed armadillo	A small species of about 1.3 kg (2.9 lb). It was initially listed as vulnerable, but it has been judged that there is not enough data for evaluation.	Peru
Dasypus sabanicola - Feijo et al 2018 holotype	D. sabanicola	Llanos long-nosed armadillo or northern long-nosed armadillo	About 1.5 kg (3.3 lb) in size. It is considered near threatened due to hunting and extreme habitat loss from biofuel production and other agrochemical productions.	Venezuela and Colombia
	D. septemcinctus	Seven-banded armadillo or Brazilian lesser long-nosed armadillo	Very similar in appearance to D. hybridus, D. mazzai, and young D. novemcinctus, making the southern limits uncertain. It is about 1.5–1.8 kg (3.3–4.0 lb) and unlike most Dasypus species that prefer scrub brush areas, it tends to live in grassland areas. Gives birth to 8–12 young instead of the typical four.	Brazil, Paraguay, Bolivia, and northern Argentina
	D. novemcinctus	Nine-banded armadillo or long-nosed armadillo	Best known and most widely distributed species. It is the only species that is increasing in range and number. Average weight is about 2–6 kg (4.4–13 lb). There are six subspecies: D. n. novemcinctus, D. n. aequatorialis, D. n. fenestratus, D. n. hoplites, D. n. mexianae and D. n. mexicanus.	Found throughout the southern United States, Central America, and South America. Within the United States, it currently inhabits Texas, Louisiana, Arkansas, Oklahoma, Alabama, Mississippi, Florida, Tennessee and Georgia. It is found in the Lesser Antilles, Tobago, Grenada and Trinidad. It can also be found in numerous islands of the Caribbean, where it may have arrived on trading ships.
	D. mazzai	Yepes's mulita or Yunga's lesser long nosed armadillo	About 1.5–2 kg (3.3–4.4 lb) in weight	Argentina and possibly Bolivia

An additional Dasypus species that is of medium size with noticeably shorter ears and tail is speculated to exist in Paraguay.

=== Fossils ===
- †Beautiful armadillo (Dasypus bellus) is an extinct armadillo species found in North and South America about 2.5 million to 11,000 years ago. It is much larger than current-day species, at about 2.5 times the size of the normal nine-banded armadillo, and had much thicker, more robust armor.
- †Dasypus neogaeus, from the Huayquerian Ituzaingó Formation of the Paraná Basin in northeastern Argentina

== Habitat ==
Armadillos are most often found in shady forests and brush areas in temperate regions. They thrive in high rainfall habitats, most likely due to better soil conditions for burrowing and a higher abundance of food. They are also known to inhabit various other environments, ranging from grassland to swamp areas, and are able to adapt to numerous regions as long as adequate food and water are available. It has been noted that armadillo species are extremely fond of water and will not only use streams for feeding and drinking but also for mud baths.

Most Dasypus species are sensitive to temperature due to poor insulation. Because of this, they currently are not found in regions with temperatures below −2 °C (28 °F) or 24 annual freeze-over days. They are, however, able to withstand short cold periods by remaining in their burrows.

Armadillo's burrow systems may be up to ten meters in length and two meter deep, and are complex systems with a conjoined central den. Armadillos are known to have as many as twelve burrow sites and multiple entrances for each. They often have a primary burrow for nesting and additional shallow burrows within their territory as food traps. In certain coastal prairies, armadillos dig additional burrows for flood protection. Armadillos have been documented to occasionally share burrows with other animals such as rabbits or skunks. However, they very rarely share their burrow with another armadillo except during the mating season. One such incidence of adult armadillos sharing burrows is during extreme cold weather, in which sharing may enhance thermoregulation.

== Ecology and behavior ==
Dasypus are typically non-aggressive, solitary animals. They are, however, known to occasionally show slight aggressive behavior during the mating season or while a female is nursing. Such behavior often includes kicking or chasing and does not cause substantial injury. Armadillos are more likely to respond to threats by freezing, jumping into the air, or sprinting away.

Armadillos use olfaction as their main perception for foraging. The nine-banded armadillos are capable of smelling food as much as 20 cm (7.9 in) below the ground surface. Once a food item is detected, it digs a small hole using its forefeet. Armadillos are also known to stand on their hind legs using their tail to brace themselves and sniff the air to either locate food or orient themselves.

Because of armadillos' low body temperature, scavenging habits, and damp living environments, they are susceptible to certain infections and parasites. Some of these include the bacterium Mycobacterium leprae, which is the causative of leprosy, the organism Trypanosoma cruzi, which is the causative of Chagas' disease, and the fungus Paracoccidiodies brasiliensis, which is the causative of mycosis in humans. Despite these predispositions, however, armadillos are still considered less prone to getting parasites than other common small mammals such as skunks, opossums, and raccoons. No diagnosis of rabies within Dasypus species in Florida has been recorded yet.

In some locations in Florida, Dasypus have more recently been noted to raid and destroy sea turtle nests, specifically those belonging to the endangered leatherback (Dermochelys coriacea), loggerhead (Caretta caretta), and the green (Chelonia mydas). This accounts for 95% of nest raids in the area and may present a large invasive problem. In order to protect the endangered sea turtles, National Wildlife Refuge staff and the USDA Wildlife Services have actively trapped and removed armadillos from nesting locations. However, though the growth of armadillos in Florida may be contributing to sea turtle extinction, they are also serving as an important primary food source to maintain the endangered Florida panther (F. concolor coryi).

Armadillos have a life expectancy of 7 to 20 years. Juveniles lack fully developed and strengthened armor and are much more susceptible to predation, thereby having a much higher mortality rate than adults. Adult armadillos, however, have shown a significant increase in physical damage compared to juveniles. Since juvenile mortality rates are much higher, this most likely indicates an increased ability of adults to escape from predators. Strangely, various physical damages caused to armadillos do not appear to have any significant consequences in breeding or other physical functions. In captivity, armadillos have a much higher life expectancy, with one recorded D. novemcinctus species living 23 years.

One of the largest causes of death of armadillos within North America is highway accidents. This is most likely due to their common response of jumping into the air when startled, which causes a direct collision with a passing automobile. Armadillos are also killed by dogs or coyotes, as well as hunted by humans as a food source. Despite hunting, predation, and highway accidents, the IUCN lists the majority of Dasypus species as a least concern endangered animal due to its very large distribution, living tolerance, and large progeny and population. A few species are considered at risk due to habitat loss.

=== Feeding ===
Most Dasypus are opportunistic feeders. They are insectivores to omnivores, but are also known to eat small vertebrates. A study conducted on the nine-banded armadillo's stomach content concluded that their diet consists of approximately 7% plant matter and 93% animal matter. Plants include fruit, seeds, mushroom and fungi and animal matter includes beetles, snails, ants, worms, reptiles, and amphibians. They also occasionally eat small mammals, bird eggs, and carrion. However, it is believed that carrion is more readily eaten by the maggots and fly pupae within. Armadillos swallow their food with small soil particles and usually avoid chewing altogether.

=== Reproduction ===
Armadillos of the genus Dasypus often pair during the breeding season, whereas they are usually solitary animals. While pairing, the male and female intermittently interact while foraging. These interactions include tail wagging, dorsal touching, sniffing, and tail lifting of the female.

Females have an external clitoris and a urogenital sinus, which acts as both a urethra and vagina. Males are slightly larger than females in size and have testes that descend into the pelvis and a prominent penis. They lack a scrotum. To copulate, the female has to lie on her back due to the high amount of bony armor and the ventrally located genitalia.

After conception, there is a fourteen-week period before the blastocyst is actually implanted. The blastocyst is fully developed and remains healthy through oxygen and nutrients received from uterine secretions during this time. Gestation is about five months long, and the implantation delay allows the armadillos to give birth at a more opportune time during the spring.

Members of Dasypus are unique among mammals in possessing the reproductive trait of monozygotic polyembryony, meaning their offspring are genetically identical due to the division of a single fertilized egg into four matching embryos. This development of identical quadruplets has been utilized as a tool for genetic research. It is possible that the monozygotic polyembryony was an adaptation to accommodate the female's inability to carry more than one egg during the preimplantation stage. Delaying the implantation further does not affect the number of offspring produced.

The armadillo's young are fully developed at birth. Their eyes are already open, and they are capable of walking after a few hours. However, the skin takes a few weeks to harden. The baby armadillos nurse for two months, and by month three or four, they are completely independent. Young armadillos have been noted to occasionally share burrows with siblings during their first summer and fall. Armadillos born in the spring can breed during the very next season and the following summer.

== Leprosy ==
Leprosy is a chronic infectious disease caused by the bacteria Mycobacterium leprae. M. leprae is unculturable on artificial media, and only after years of research was the ability to culture the bacteria on the footpads of mice discovered. However, the development of the bacteria and study was still very limited until the successful infection of lepromatous leprosy in the nine-banded armadillo (Dasypus novemcinctus) by Kirchheimer and Storrs in 1971. Soon after, Convit and Pinardi incurred a second successful inoculation of M. leprae into Dasypus sabanicola. The armadillo became the only known animal other than primates to regularly develop leprosy and has since largely advanced the disease study through the use of in vivo propagation of M. leprae. Dasypus was also an ideal model due to the ability to replicate experiments on their genetically identical siblings. Despite the discovery of additional Dasypus species capable of infection (D. septemcinctus and D. pilosus), the nine-banded armadillo remains a favored animal model due to its availability and ideal body temperatures for bacterial hosting. D. sabanicola is also continually used in research due to its adaptability to the lab environment and ease of handling. The nine-banded armadillo's enhanced ability to grow M. leprae has led to suggestions that armadillo species are more susceptible to the disease due to their generally lower body temperatures.

While temperature enhances susceptibility, the actual infection source and mode of transmission are very poorly understood. This is primarily due to the bacteria's slow multiplication rate and long incubation period, making specific infection period identification difficult. The incubation period itself may range from ten months to four years in the nine-banded armadillo, compared to three to six years in humans. The long life of armadillos is particularly useful in the study of chronic effects of leprosy as well as the propagation of M. leprae outside of humans. The armadillo model has been useful for biochemical, immunological, and vaccine research.

Though the majority of nine-banded armadillos contract leprosy, about 15% of the species are resistant. The resistant specimens are used as a study model to develop a possible genetic linkage.
