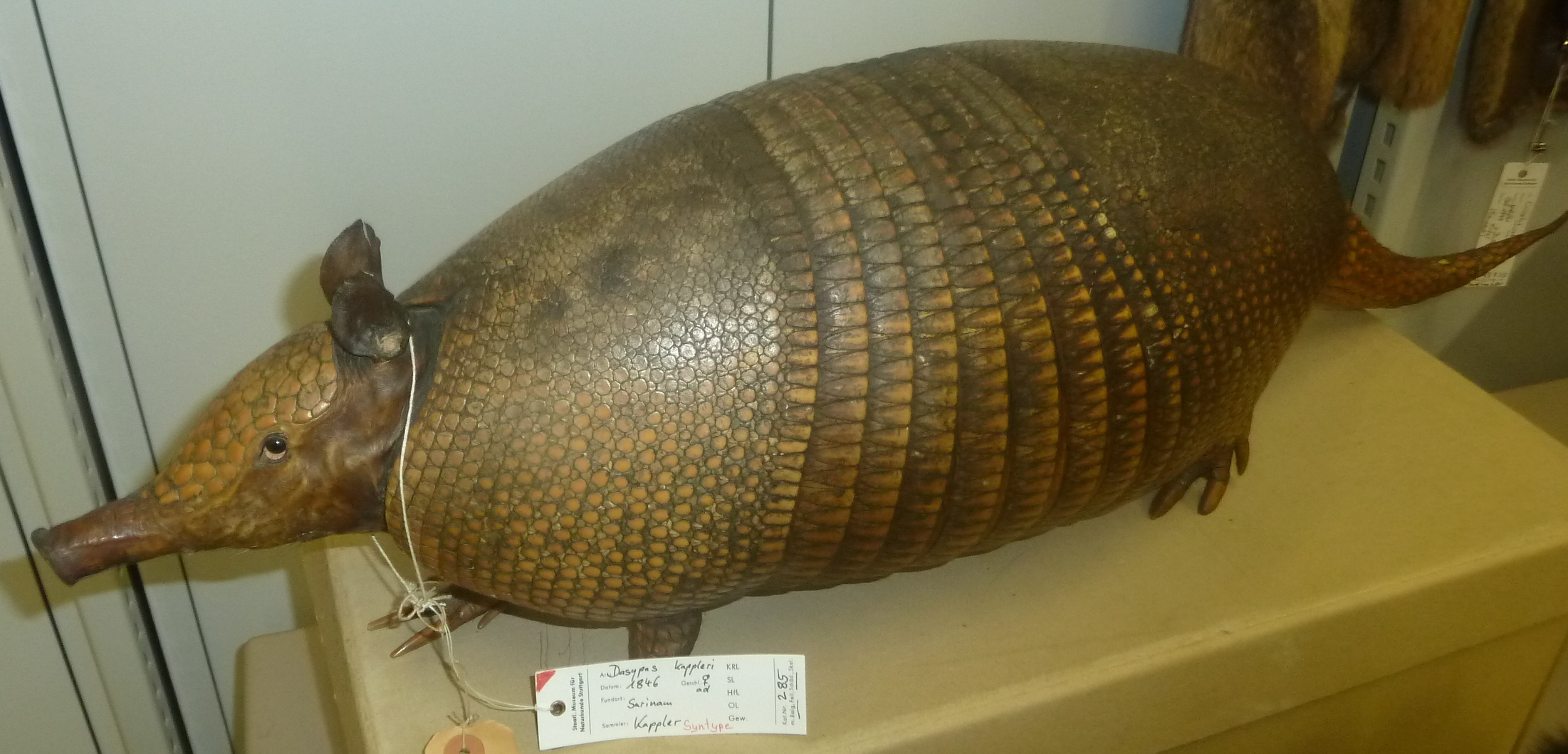

Conservation status
- Least Concern (IUCN 3.1)

Scientific classification
- Kingdom: Animalia
- Phylum: Chordata
- Class: Mammalia
- Order: Cingulata
- Family: Dasypodidae
- Genus: Dasypus
- Species: D. kappleri

Binomial name
- Dasypus kappleri Krauss, 1862
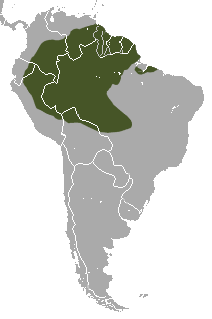
- Greater long-nosed armadillo range

= Greater long-nosed armadillo =

Species of mammal

The greater long-nosed armadillo (Dasypus kappleri) is a South American species of armadillo found in Colombia, Venezuela, Ecuador, Guyana, Suriname, French Guiana, Peru, Bolivia and Brazil. It is a solitary, nocturnal, terrestrial animal that feeds on arthropods and other invertebrates, usually living in the vicinity of streams and swamps.

One of the larger species of armadillo, it measures 83 to 106 cm (33 to 42 in) in total length and generally weighing 8.5 to 10.5 kg (19 to 23 lb), though it can reach as much as 15 kg (33 lb). Spurs on its hind legs allow it to crawl on its knees into narrow tunnels.

== Subspecies ==
Two subspecies are recognised:

- D. k. kappleri (Krauss, 1862), also called the Guianan Shield long-nosed armadillo, is found from southeastern Colombia, southern Venezuela, French Guiana, Guyana and Suriname to the lower part of the Amazon Basin in Brazil.
- D. k. pastasae (Thomas, 1901), also called the West Amazonian long-nosed armadillo, is from eastern Ecuador, eastern Peru, northeastern Bolivia and the upper part of the Amazon basin in Brazil.

== Description ==
The greater long-nose armadillo is the largest armadillo in its genus. Its head-and-body length is between 51 and 57 cm (20 and 22 in) and its tail between 32 and 48 cm (13 and 19 in), with a weight usually varying between 8.5 and 10.5 kg (19 and 23 lb). Like other armadillos, the forequarters and the hindquarters are each protected by an armoured shield, and in this species, there are seven or eight ossified rings between the two. A distinguishing characteristic of this species is the transverse rows of large projecting scales on the hind side of the rear legs.

== Distribution and habitat ==
This armadillo is native to tropical northeastern South America. Its range includes Guyana, Suriname, French Guiana, Colombia to the east of the Andes, Venezuela to the south of the Orinoco River, and the Amazon Basin of Brazil, Ecuador, Peru and northeastern Bolivia. It is a mammal of humid lowland forest in the basins of the Orinoco and Amazon. It also occurs in patches of forest in savannah areas. It is common in forested areas in the uplands, where less hunting takes place, and forages on floodplains near headwater streams, in palm swamps, and on hillsides and hilltops.

== Ecology ==
The species has been little studied by researchers and its natural history is poorly known. However, the Matsés people, an indigenous tribe from the upper Amazon basin, were able to tell researchers a great deal about the animals. This armadillo is solitary and nocturnal. It spends the day in a burrow dug in the bank of a gully or beside a stream on the flood plain. The burrow has a single entrance, a pungent, leaf-lined sleeping chamber and a long retreat tunnel, often sloppy with a little water. Each animal has several burrows which it occupies on different days. Small white flies live in association with this armadillo. They are present by day at the entrance of active burrows, and are more numerous when an armadillo is in residence. This armadillo is hunted for food by the Matsés people and is much esteemed, especially in April and May when it is at its fattest. It is usually caught by flooding its burrow and digging it out. When disturbed it makes a rumbling growl, and when attacked, growls more loudly.

Before dusk the armadillo starts to stir. When it is fully dark it rushes out of the burrow and sets off along one of its paths; these run along hill tops and across foraging areas. The armadillo stops at intervals to hunt around for beetles and their larvae, millipedes and centipedes, digging in soft ground for earthworms, and also consuming fallen fruit. It is very fond of the fruits of the Oenocarpus bataua palm, and also eats the ants that climb on these fruits, as well as any other invertebrates it may chance upon. It may swim across streams and wallow in mud holes. When dawn is approaching it finds its path and follows it to one of its burrows. Here it gathers some leaf litter to add to its resting chamber and retires underground. It moves around, compressing its bed for a while before settling down. It sometimes emerges from its burrow by day during heavy rain.

Mating may take place when two animals encounter each other at night. The female usually has two offspring which are born in the burrow, and follow her around when they are old enough to do so. When out at night, jaguars (Panthera onca) and pumas (Puma concolor) are the greatest danger to the armadillo. When it crosses streams, the armadillo may be seized by a black caiman (Melanosuchus niger) or a green anaconda (Eunectes murinus). It can also be killed by tayras (Eira barbara) when several hunt together. During the day, bush dogs (Speothos venaticus) sometimes enter the burrow and pull the armadillo out, eating it beside the entrance.

== Status ==
D. kappleri has a very wide range and is present in a number of protected areas. The chief threat it faces is from deforestation as it is unable to live in open countryside. It is hunted for meat in some areas but no other significant threats have been identified. The International Union for Conservation of Nature has rated its conservation status as being of "least concern". In the Llanos region of Colombia, the organisation Fundación Omacha is undertaking an education and awareness campaign among local people featuring this species.

== See also ==
- Emmons, Louise H.; Feer, François (1997-09-02). Neotropical rainforest mammals. A field guide (2nd ed.). Chicago: University of Chicago Press. p. 50. ISBN 978-0-226-20721-6. OCLC 44179508.
