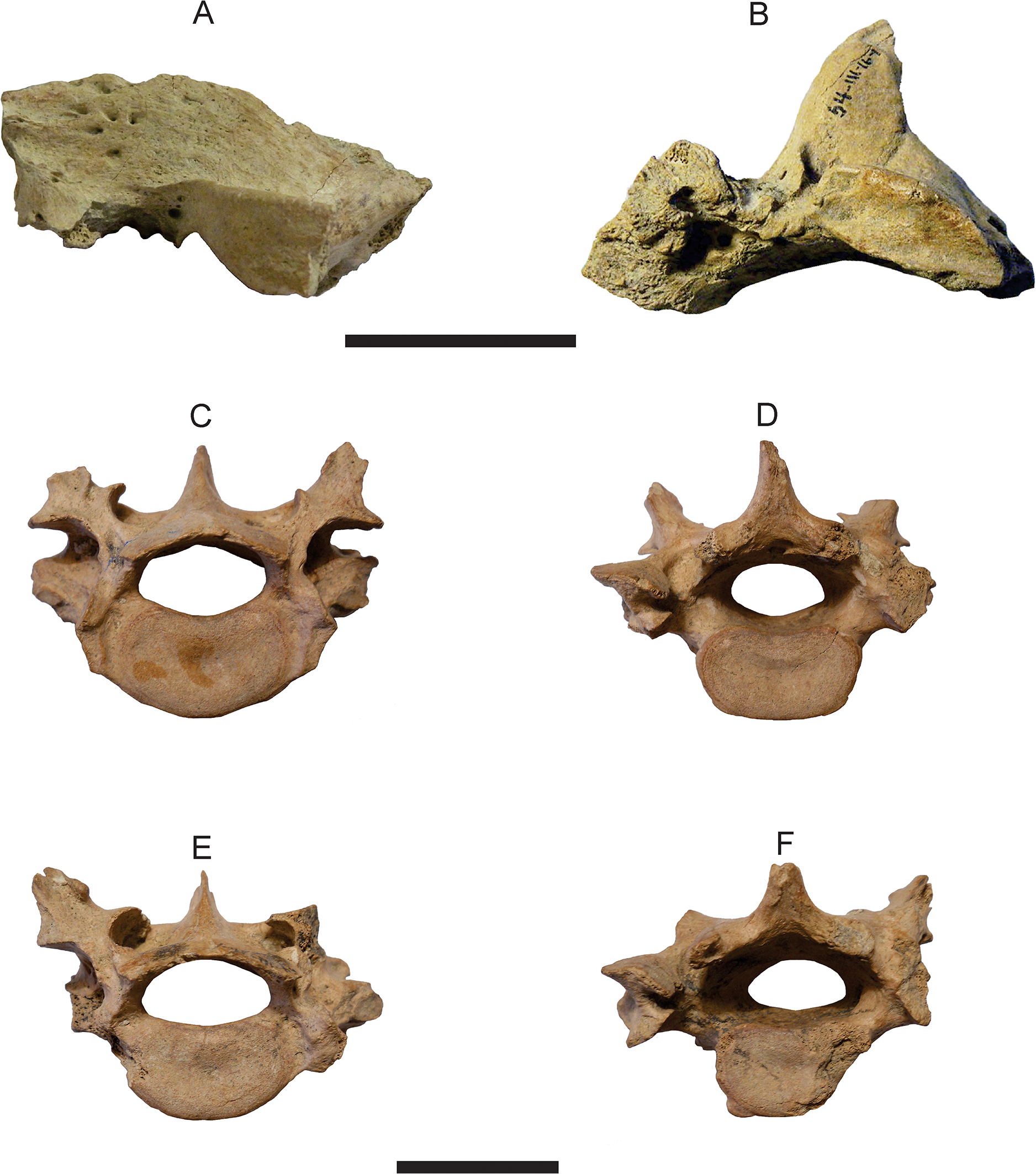

Scientific classification
- Kingdom: Animalia
- Phylum: Chordata
- Class: Mammalia
- Order: Cingulata
- Family: †Pampatheriidae
- Genus: †Tonnicinctus; Góis et al., 2015
- Species: †T. mirus

Binomial name
- †Tonnicinctus mirus Góis et al., 2015

= Tonnicinctus =

Tonnicinctus Temporal range: Pleistocene - Holocene 1.8–0.01 Ma

Extinct genus of mammals

Tonnicinctus is an extinct species of pampatheriid that lived in Argentina during the Pleistocene and Holocene.

== Description ==
Tonnicinctus inhabited cool grassland regions. It was a medium-sized pampatheriid, smaller than its better-known relatives like Pampatherium and Holmesina. It is distinguishes from other Pampathreres by: osteoderms which are intermediate in thickness between Pampatherium and Holmesina; very wide anterior and lateral margins with several large and deep foramina; wide and uniform marginal elevation in the fixed osteoderms and very narrow marginal elevation in movable and semi-movable osteoderms of the scapular and pelvic buckler.
