= Phlyctaenopyga =

Phlyctaenopyga Temporal range: Late Miocene-Early Pliocene ~8–4 Ma

Scientific classification
- Kingdom: Animalia
- Phylum: Chordata
- Class: Mammalia
- Order: Cingulata
- Family: Chlamyphoridae
- Subfamily: †Glyptodontinae
- Genus: †Phlyctaenopyga; Cabrera, 1944

Type species
- Phlyctaenopyga ameghini Moreno, 1882

Species
- P. ameghini Moreno 1882; P. trouessarti Moreno 1888

Synonyms
- Hoplophorus philippii Moreno & Mercerat 1891; Neuryurus compressidens Moreno & Mercerat 1891

Extinct genus of mammals

Phlyctaenopyga is an extinct genus of glyptodont. It lived from the Late Miocene to the Early Pliocene, and its fossilized remains were discovered in South America.

== Description ==
Like all glyptodonts, this animal had a robust carapace, formed by osteoderms fused together, covering a large part of its body. Phlyctaenopyga was a medium-sized glyptodont, not exceeding two meters in length. Its carapace was made of osteoderms whose central figure was surrounded by two or three rows of peripheral figures; the second row was complete only in a few osteoderms in Phlyctaenopyga ameghini, while the third row was always incomplete. The central figure of the osteoderms was convex and protruding, almost hemispherical. The skull was very short and broad, especially in the snout area. The osteoderms covering the head were practically devoid of ornamentation.

== Classification ==
The genus Phlyctaenopyga was first described in 1944 by Cabrera, for a species of Late Miocene glyptodont first ascribed to the genus Plohophorus, P. ameghini. Cabrera also attributed the species Nopachthus trouessarti to this genus, as Phlyctaenopyga trouessarti. Those two species were mainly distinguished by details of their osteoderms.

Phlyctaenopyga was a glyptodont, a clade of cingulates related to the modern armadillos, with a rigid carapace. Phlyctaenopyga seems to have been close to the genera Nopachthus and Plohophorus, within the tribe Sclerocalyptini.

== Bibliography ==
- Moreno, F.P. 1888. Informe preliminar de los progresos del Museo La Plata durante el primer semestre de 1888 presentado al señor ministro de Obras Públicas de la provincia de Buenos Aires. Boletín del Museo La Plata.
- Ameghino, F. 1889. Contribución al conocimiento de los mamíferos fósiles de la República Argentina. Actas Academia Nacional de Ciencias de Córdoba 6: 32 + 1028 y Atlas de 98 láms.
- Cabrera, A. 1944. Los Gliptodontoideos del Araucaniano de Catamarca. Revista del Museo de La Plata (N. Serie), Paleontología 3: 5-76.
- Zamorano, M.; Scillato-Yané G.; Gonzalez-Ruiz, L.R. & Zurita, A.E, (2011). Revisión de los géneros Nopachtus Ameghino y Phlyctaenopyga Cabrera (Xenarthra, Glyptodontidae, Hoplophorinae) del Mioceno tardío y Plioceno de Argentina. Revista del Museo Argentino de Ciencias Naturales "Bernardino Rivadavia", 13 (1): 59–68.
