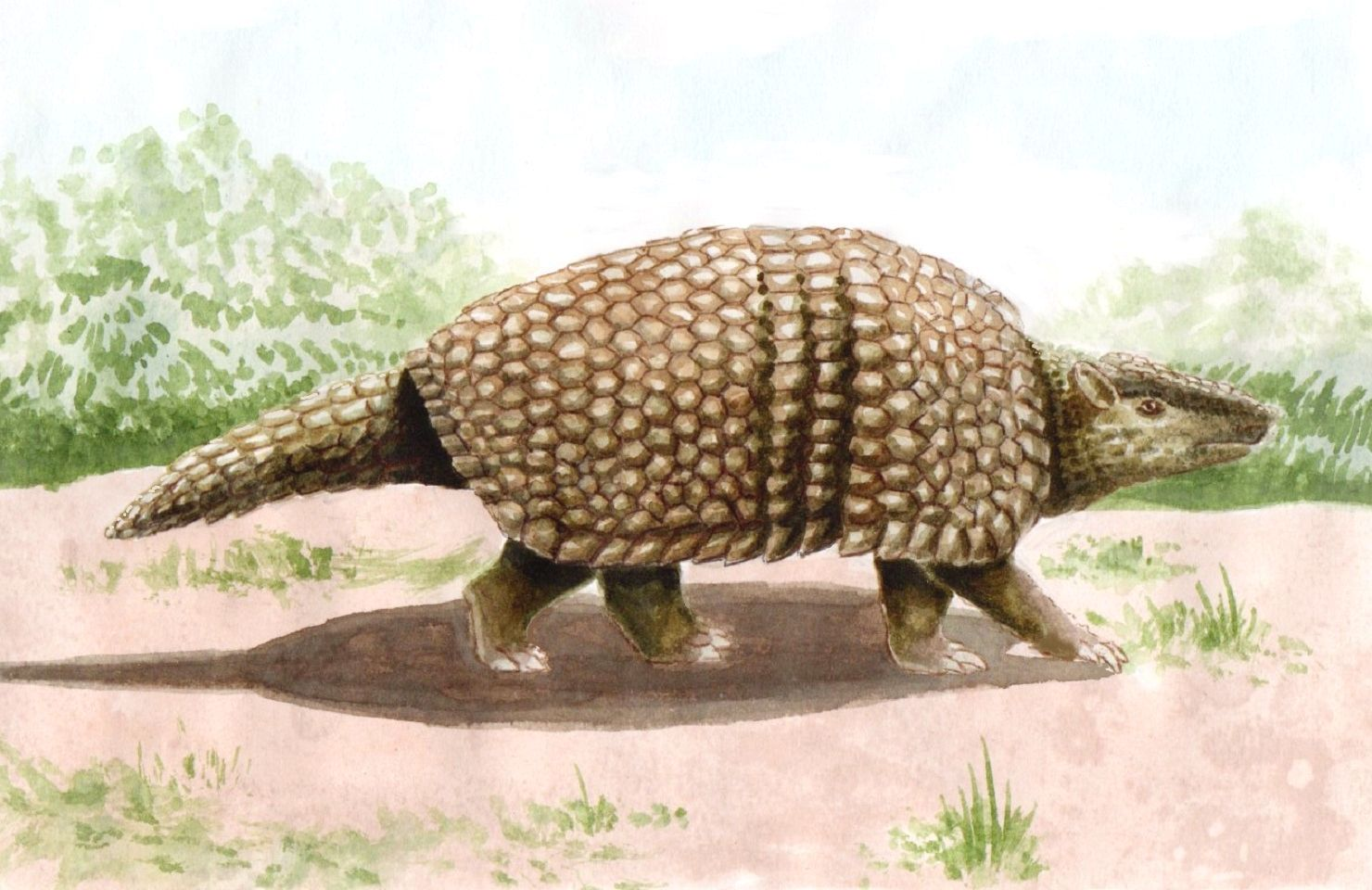
- Life reconstruction of Scirrotherium

Scientific classification
- Kingdom: Animalia
- Phylum: Chordata
- Class: Mammalia
- Order: Cingulata
- Family: †Pampatheriidae
- Genus: †Scirrotherium; Edmund & Theodor, 1997

Type species
- †Scirrotherium hondaensis Edmund & Theodor, 1997

Species
- S. hondaensis Edmund & Theodor, 1997; S. carinatum Góis et al 2013

= Scirrotherium =

Scirrotherium Temporal range: Middle Miocene-Late Pliocene ~13.8–5.4 Ma

Extinct genus of mammals

Scirrotherium is an extinct genus of pampatheres, a family of herbivorous cingulates, related to the similar but smaller modern armadillos, and with the now extinct glyptodonts, well-known from their shell-like armor. Its scientific name is derived from the Greek prefix "skiros-", "cover", and the suffix "-therion, "beast", while the name of the type species, hondaensis, honors the town of Honda, in the Tolima Department of Colombia. Scirrotherium is one of several genera of xenarthrans found in the La Venta fauna, dated from the Middle Miocene.

== Description ==
Scirrotherium is only known from an incomplete skull preserving teeth, a fragmentary mandible, postcranial vertebrae, and parts of its osteoderm armor. These remains were smaller than in its relative Kraglievichia, and larger than those of Vassallia. Scirrotherium was characterized by its cylindrical molars, a bilobed eighth lower molar, and by the presence in the third thoracic vertebra of a disc-shaped surface, conjectured to have had a little mobility. In Scirrotherium hondaensis, the mobile osteoderms presented in the sculpted area foramina aligned in two rows, with marked lateral edges, and a short, rounded and narrow axial elevation. The fixed osteoderms had fewer foramina arranged in the form of an arch with a posterior concavity and a narrower longitudinal central elevation, delimited by superficial longitudinal depressions. Pampathere osteoderms attributed to this genus, from the Ituzaingó Formation in the Entre Ríos Province of Argentina, the Puerto Madryn Formation in the Valdes Peninsula in Argentine Patagonia and the Solimões Formation in the Brazilian State of Acre, under the species S. carinatum have some anatomical differences with the type species, such as the anterior foramina of the mobile osteoderms arranged in a row and a longitudinal central elevation carinated.
