= Vassallia =

Vassallia Temporal range: Middle Miocene-Late Pliocene (Tinguirirican-Montehermosan) ~33.9–5.4 Ma

Scientific classification
- Kingdom: Animalia
- Phylum: Chordata
- Class: Mammalia
- Infraclass: Placentalia
- Order: Cingulata
- Family: †Pampatheriidae
- Genus: †Vassallia; Castellanos 1927

Type species
- †Vassallia minuta Moreno and Mercerat 1891

Species
- V. maxima Castellanos 1927; V. minuta Moreno and Mercerat, 1891

Extinct genus of cingulates

Vassallia is an extinct genus of cingulate belonging to the family Pampatheriidae. It lived between the Middle Oligocene and the Early Pliocene in what is now South America.

== Description ==
This animal must have been very similar in shape and size to today's giant armadillo (Priodontes maximus); it is likely that the largest species of Vassallia maxima could have exceeded one meter in length. Like all pampatheres, Vassallia was also equipped with an armor consisting of osteoderms articulated with each other to form two rigid structures, one anterior and one posterior, and a few bands of movable osteoderms that allowed partial movement of the back. Vassallia was very similar to another pampathere, Kraglievichia from which it differed mainly in some dental features (the teeth had a somewhat simpler structure) and bony plates, which had a main figure with a slightly elevated central area.

A study carried out on the dentition and morphology of jaw and mandible of Vassallia indicated that this animal possessed some features comparable to those of some mammalian ungulates, such as wide and flattened mandibular condyles, non-fused mandibular symphysis, expanded angular processes, posteriorly extended tooth row, open root teeth, mesial teeth with transverse striations, elongated and gradually arranged distal teeth. Vassallia also, unlike other pampatheres such as Holmesina', possessed on the occlusal surfaces of the teeth a central island of dentin resistant dentin that functioned as an ectoloph, which is also present in ungulates.

== Classification ==
The genus Vassallia was first described by Castellanos in 1927; the type species, Vassallia minuta, was smaller than that of the larger contemporary pampathere Kraglievichia, while V. maxima, described by Castellanos himself a few years later, was larger. Remains of these species have been found in Argentina, while fossils akin to those of V. minuta have been found in Bolivia.

Vassallia is a member of the Pampatheriidae, an extinct family of cingulates of closely related to armadillos, but equipped with a different type of armor and dentition. In particular, it appears that Vassallia is a possible ancestor, or very close in origin, of the genus Kraglievichia, which in turn is seen as ancestral to the well-known Pampatherium.

== Paleobiology ==
=== Palaeoecology ===
Study of the morphology of the teeth and jaws of Vassallia indicates that this animal was a herbivore, probably feeding on grass and not on leaves and shrubs. This is based on the significant size of its temporal and masseteric muscle attachment regions.

== Bibliography ==
- Castellanos, A. (1927). Breves notas sobre los clamidoterios. Publ. Cent. Est. Ing. Rosario 1-8, Argentina.
- L. G. Marshall and T. Sempere. 1991. The Eocene to Pleistocene vertebrates of Bolivia and their stratigraphic context: a review. Fósiles y Facies de Bolivia – Vol. 1 Vertebrados (Revista Ténica de YPFB) 12(3–4):631–652.
- De Iuliis G, Edmund AG. Vassallia maxima Castellanos, 1946 (Mammalia: Xenarthra: Pampatheriidae), from Puerta del CorralQuemado (Late Miocene to Early Pliocene), Catamarca Province, Argentina. 2002. In: Cenozoic Mammals of Land and Sea. Emry RJ, editor. Washington, Smithsonian Institution Press; 93: 49 – 64.
