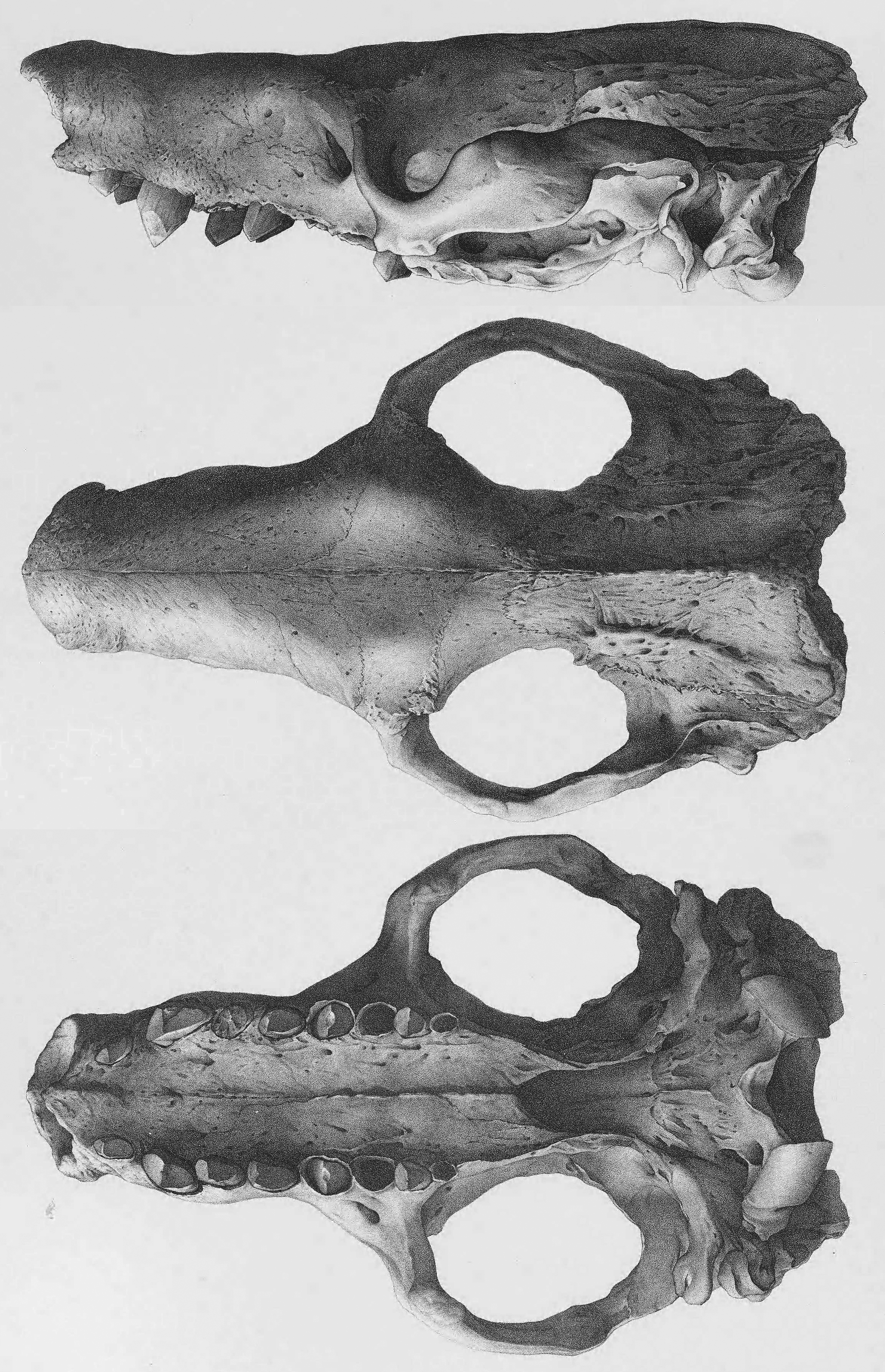
- Skull

Scientific classification
- Kingdom: Animalia
- Phylum: Chordata
- Class: Mammalia
- Order: Cingulata
- Family: Chlamyphoridae
- Subfamily: Euphractinae
- Genus: †Macroeuphractus; Ameghino, 1887

Type species
- †Macroeuphractus retusus Ameghino, 1887

Other species
- †M. outesi Ameghino, 1908; †M. moreni Lydekker, 1894

= Macroeuphractus =

Macroeuphractus Temporal range: Late Miocene-Late Pliocene (Huayquerian-Chapadmalalan) ~9–3 Ma

Extinct genus of mammals

Macroeuphractus is a genus of extinct armadillos from the Late Miocene to Late Pliocene of South America. The genus is noted for its large size, with Macroeuphractus outesi being the largest non-pampathere or glyptodont armadillo discovered, as well as its specializations for carnivory, unique among all xenarthrans.

== Taxonomy ==
In the 19th century, interest in the rich "Tertiary" (now Neogene) fossil sites of Argentina boomed. This included exploration by two teams of Argentine paleontologists: Florentino and Carlos Ameghino, who operated independently, and Francisco Pascasio Moreno and Alcides Mercerat of the Museo de La Plata (MLP). Their discoveries comprised thousands of fossils from Cenozoic fossil deposits throughout Patagonia and central Argentina.

Osteoderms of M. retusus are distinguished from those of M. moreni by their shallower grooves and dorsoventrally (top-bottom) flatter figures (the shape of the osteoderm). M. retusus is only known from the Ituzaingó, Monte Hermoso, and Cerro Azul Formations of Entre Ríos, Buenos Aires, and La Pampa Provinces respectively. In contrast, M. moreni is endemic to the Epecuén Formation of Catamarca and Tucumán Provinces and the Cerro Azul Formation of La Pampa Province. M. moreni was described in 1894 by British naturalist Richard Lydekker as a new species of Dasypus on the basis of several osteoderms that were collected from the “Catamarca beds”.

== Description ==
M. outsesi is known from one specimen from the Late Pliocene of Buenos Aires, Argentina. This specimen is composed of a fairly well preserved skull as well as numerous postcranial elements. It represented a considerably large species at around 100 kilograms (220 lb), although it is possible that it was actually closer to 30 kilograms (66 lb), at a little over 1 meter (3 ft 3 in) in length it would still be a decently sized predator.

=== Anatomy ===
In lateral (side) profile, the skull of M. outesi is elongated and straight with a slightly downward-turned snout. At the anterior (front) end of the skull are the premaxillae (frontmost tooth-bearing skull bones), which are vertically vaulted, giving it a tall snout. The dental formula of Macroeuphractus is 8/8 (eight teeth on bottom and top), meanwhile Macrochorobates' is 10/10 and Euphractus' is 9/10. Unlike Dasypus, M. retusus' first pair of teeth are small, while the second pair is enlarged and canine-shaped. A small diastema (tooth gap) separates the first and second molariforms. The third pair is also small, whereas the rest of the teeth in the maxilla (upper jaw bone) regularly increase in size posteriorly (towards the back). Unlike most armadillos, Macroeuphractus has nasal bones (nose bones) that widen towards the tip, creating a broad rostrum. These nasal bones project over the nasal aperture, as in Euphractus but not in Macrochorobates.

On the anterior end of the zygomatic process (cheekbones) are two weakly-expanded olfactory bulbs (area of the brain involved in smell). The development of the zygomatic processes suggest that Macroeuphractus had an enlarged, broad orbit, like other euphractines. At the base of these processes are the infraorbital foramen (pits in bone in front of the orbit). On the dorsal surface of the skull is a large sagittal crest (a ridge of bone extending dorsally from the skull), a characteristic shared with Macrochorobates but absent in many armadillos. However, Macroeuphractus' crest is much broader and shorter than that of Macrochorobates. This crest runs the length of the posterior region of the dorsal surface of the skull until forming the nuchal crest. Similar to Macrochorobates, this crest is W-shaped. Scars from muscle attachment adorn the roof of the parietal, a characteristic observed in Macrochorobates but not to the same extreme. The external auditory meatus (ear canal) too is expanded, unlike in extant euphractines, but as large as in Macrochorobates. Dissimilar to that of Macrochorobates, the foramen magnum (an opening in the occipital bone that the spinal cord runs through) is triangle-shaped and expanded in ventral (bottom) view. A cephalic shield covers the skull roof, which is composed of osteoderms similar in size to those of the dorsal carapace. A complete mandible is unknown, but a fragmentary Macroeuphractus ramus was unearthed from layers of the Monte Hermoso Formation. This ramus has seven alveoli (tooth sockets), of which their sizes correspond with the sizes of teeth in the upper jaw. Its vertical ramus is relatively elongated compared to the horizontal ramus, at about two-thirds the length of the horizontal ramus.

Its skull is associated with much of the postcrania, including the presternum (backbreastbone), elements of the mesosternum (middle breastbone), fragmentary sternal ribs, a rib, an incomplete pelvis, sacrum, and some anterior (front) caudal (tail) vertebrae. Overall, their traits are similar to those of Dasypus. Alongside the skull and postcranium were a collection of osteoderms, including most of the last two movable bands of osteoderms in the carapace. As a euphractine, the dorsal osteoderms have points and serrations. Generally, the dorsal carapace is elongated but relatively featureless compared to those of other euphractines. Its carapace is not very convex in lateral view, similar to Euphractus. Dorsal carapace osteoderms of Macroeuphractus and Macrochorobates are adorned by a keel which was likely expanded by a horny scale.

== Classification ==
Macroeuphractus is traditionally grouped with euphractines; it was named after its similarity with Euphractus itself. The most recent phylogenetic examinations confirm its status as at least a sister group to euphractines, along with Paleuphractus, Doellotatus and Proeuphractus.

In a 2024 revision of the other euphractine Macrochorobates, Argentine paleontologist Daniel Barasoain and colleagues performed a phylogenetic analysis (a study of the evolutionary relationships between organisms). As in other studies, Macroeuphractus was recovered as a member of Euphractinae. The results of their study are below:

- - Peltephilidae
  - - Dasypodidae
    - Chlamyphoridae
      - Tolypeutinae
      - Euphractinae
        - Eutatini
          - Eutatus seguini
          - Chasicotatus spp.
        - Euphractini
          - Prozaedyus spp.
          - - Zaedyus pichiy
            - - Chaetophractus spp.
              - - Proeuphractus limpidus
                - - - Paleuphractus argentinus
                    - Euphractus sexcinctus
                  - - Chorobates spp.
                    - - Macrochorobates scalabrinii
                      - Macroeuphractus outesi

== Biology ==
Macroeuphractus is one of the few known xenarthrans to have specialised extensively for a carnivorous lifestyle. Modern euphractine armadillos (such as the modern six-banded armadillo) are fairly dedicated omnivores, but Macroeuphractus shows several features that indicate hypercarnivory:

- large, conical caniniform teeth
- an enlarged temporal fossa
- more developed muscles pertaining to the temporalis musculature (as evidenced by the more prominent muscle scars)
- a deeper rostrum
- more powerful anterior teeth (particularly in the enlarged and caniniform M2)
- a deeper and more robust zygomatic arch
- a greater moment arm of the temporalis muscle than in other armadillos

These features are unusual among xenarthrans but are more in line with predatory mammal groups.

Like most armadillos, Macroeuphractus was fossorial, and it probably could dig out small and medium-sized mammals such as caviomorph rodents, small notoungulates and argyrolagoidean paucituberculates. Species like Macroeuphractus outesi were fairly large and presumably had an apex predator status in their faunal communities.

== Paleoecology ==
Macroeuphractus moreni was a rather widespread species, and played a role in various faunal communities in the Miocene and Pliocene epochs of South America, while the other two species had a more limited range in Argentina. The genus occurs in an epoch where sparassodonts, phorusrhacids and sebecids entered in decline, and was among the various mammal groups to exploit this ecological vacancy prior to the arrival of North American carnivorans in the Pleistocene, alongside giant opossums such as Thylophorops. Nonetheless, Macroeuphractus still co-existed with late surviving sparassodonts such as Thylacosmilus and phorusrhacids like Llallawavis.

Macroeuphractus lived alongside Macrochorobates, another genus of medium-large carnivorous euphractine. Although both had adaptations to carnivory, the latter did not possess them to the same extent as Macroeuphractus. Overall, its anatomy was better suited for a carnivore-omnivore role, while Macroeuphractus was almost exclusively carnivorous. Furthermore, Macroeuphractus reached substantially larger sizes compared to Macrochorobates, suggesting that there was niche partitioning between them. Both genera went extinct in the Late Pliocene around the time the Great American Biotic Interchange began. The arrival of carnivores from Afroeurasia such as canids, felids, and ursids may have stopped the development of canivorous armadillos.
