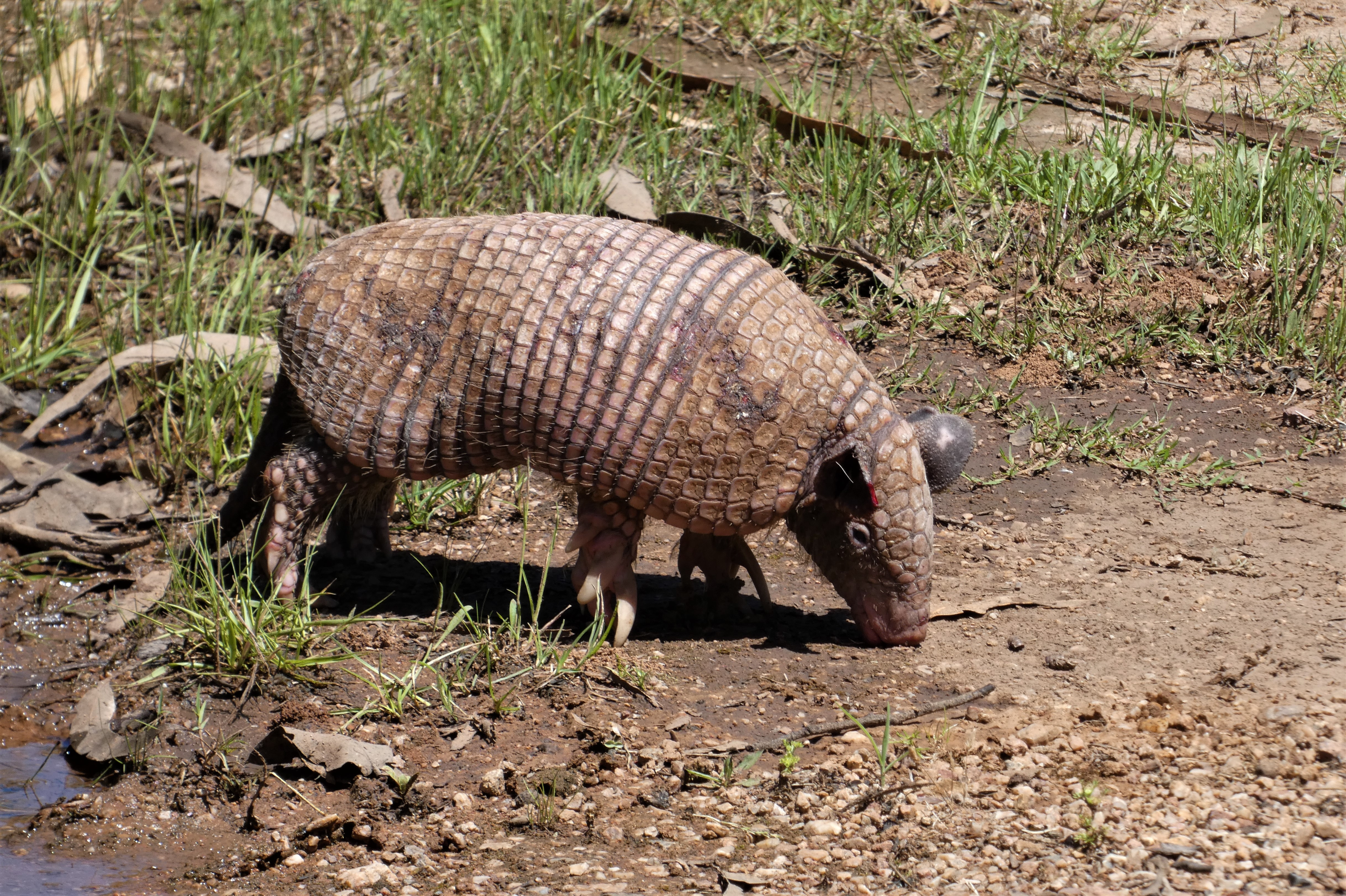
- A live tatu rabo molle, by the National Museum of Natural History, Uruguay

Conservation status
- Least Concern (IUCN 3.1)
- CITES Appendix III

Scientific classification
- Kingdom: Animalia
- Phylum: Chordata
- Class: Mammalia
- Order: Cingulata
- Family: Chlamyphoridae
- Subfamily: Tolypeutinae
- Genus: Cabassous
- Species: C. tatouay

Binomial name
- Cabassous tatouay (Desmarest, 1804)
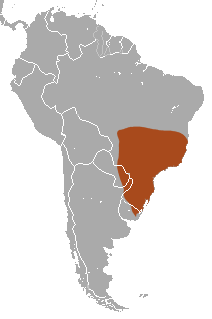
- Greater naked-tailed armadillo range

= Greater naked-tailed armadillo =

Species of mammal

The greater naked-tailed armadillo (Cabassous tatouay) is an armadillo species from South America.

== Description ==
Larger than the closely related southern naked-tailed armadillos, adults of the greater species measure 41 to 49 cm (16 to 19 in) in head-body length, with a tail 15 to 20 cm (5.9 to 7.9 in) in length. There are eight or nine uniformly shaped teeth on each side of each jaw, with no identifiable incisors or canines. The carapace includes an average of 13 movable bands between the solid shields over the shoulders and hips, with each band having about 30 individual scutes. There is also a scaled shield over the upper surface of the head, with much smaller scales on the ears and on the cheeks below the eyes. The tail bears only small, isolated scales.

== Distribution and habitat ==
Greater naked-tailed armadillos are found in southern Brazil, eastern Paraguay and Uruguay and extreme north-eastern Argentina. It inhabits lowland and submontane forests, and also relatively open areas such as the Cerrado and Pantanal. There are no recognised subspecies.

== Behaviour ==
Greater naked-tailed armadillos feed on ants and termites and sleeps in burrows, often dug within termite mounds. Burrows are typically about 20 to 25 cm (7.9 to 9.8 in) in width, and positioned so that their entrances face away from the prevailing winds.
