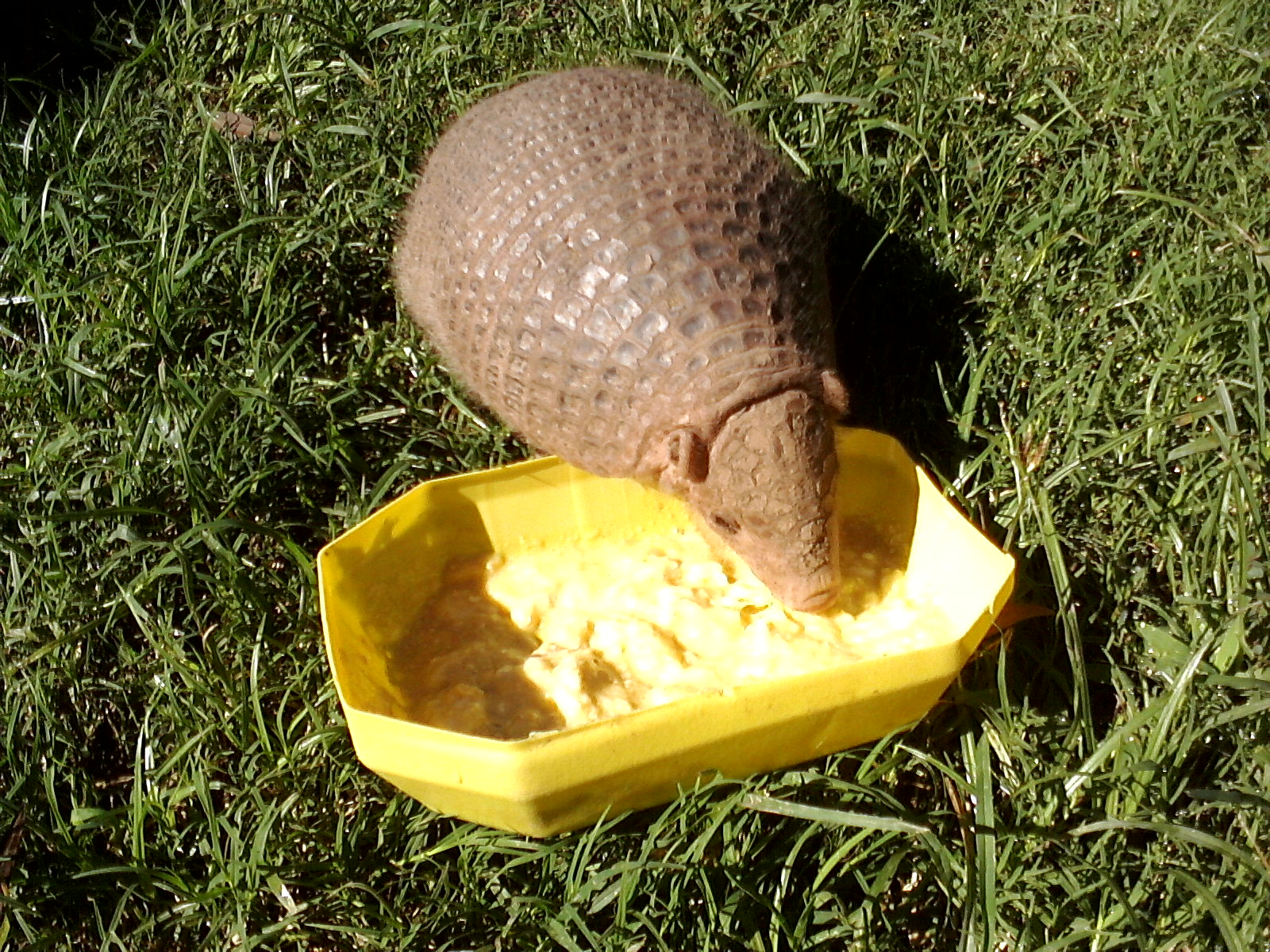
- Chacoan naked-tailed armadillo

Scientific classification
- Kingdom: Animalia
- Phylum: Chordata
- Class: Mammalia
- Order: Cingulata
- Family: Chlamyphoridae
- Subfamily: Tolypeutinae
- Genus: Cabassous; McMurtrie, 1831

Type species
- Dasypus unicinctus Linnaeus, 1758

Species
- Cabassous centralis; Cabassous chacoensis; Cabassous tatouay; Cabassous unicinctus
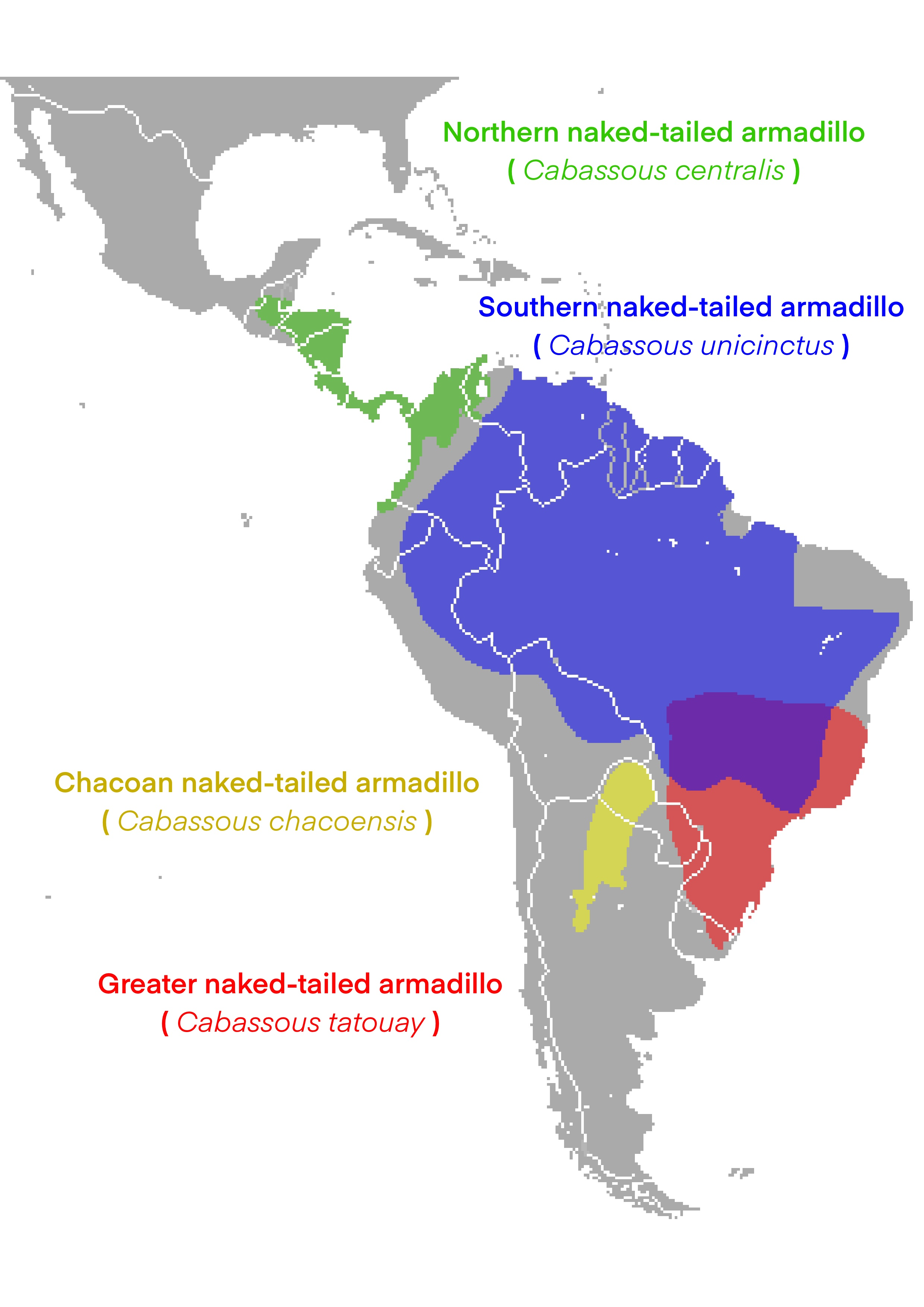

= Cabassous =

Genus of mammals belonging to the armadillo order of xenarthrans

Cabassous is a genus of South and Central American armadillos. The name is the Latinised form of the Kalini word for "armadillo".

Cladogram of living Cabassous

- Cabassous
  - C. tatouay
  - - C. chacoensis
    - - C. centralis
      - C. unicinctus

The genus contains the following four species:

Image	Scientific name	Common name	Distribution
	C. centralis	Northern naked-tailed armadillo	from Chiapas in southern Mexico to western Colombia, northwestern Ecuador and northwestern Venezuela
	C. chacoensis	Chacoan naked-tailed armadillo	the Gran Chaco region of western Paraguay and north-central Argentina
	C. tatouay	Greater naked-tailed armadillo	southern Brazil, eastern Paraguay and Uruguay and extreme north-eastern Argentina
	C. unicinctus	Southern naked-tailed armadillo	northern South America east of the Andes, as far south as northern Paraguay and southern Brazil.
