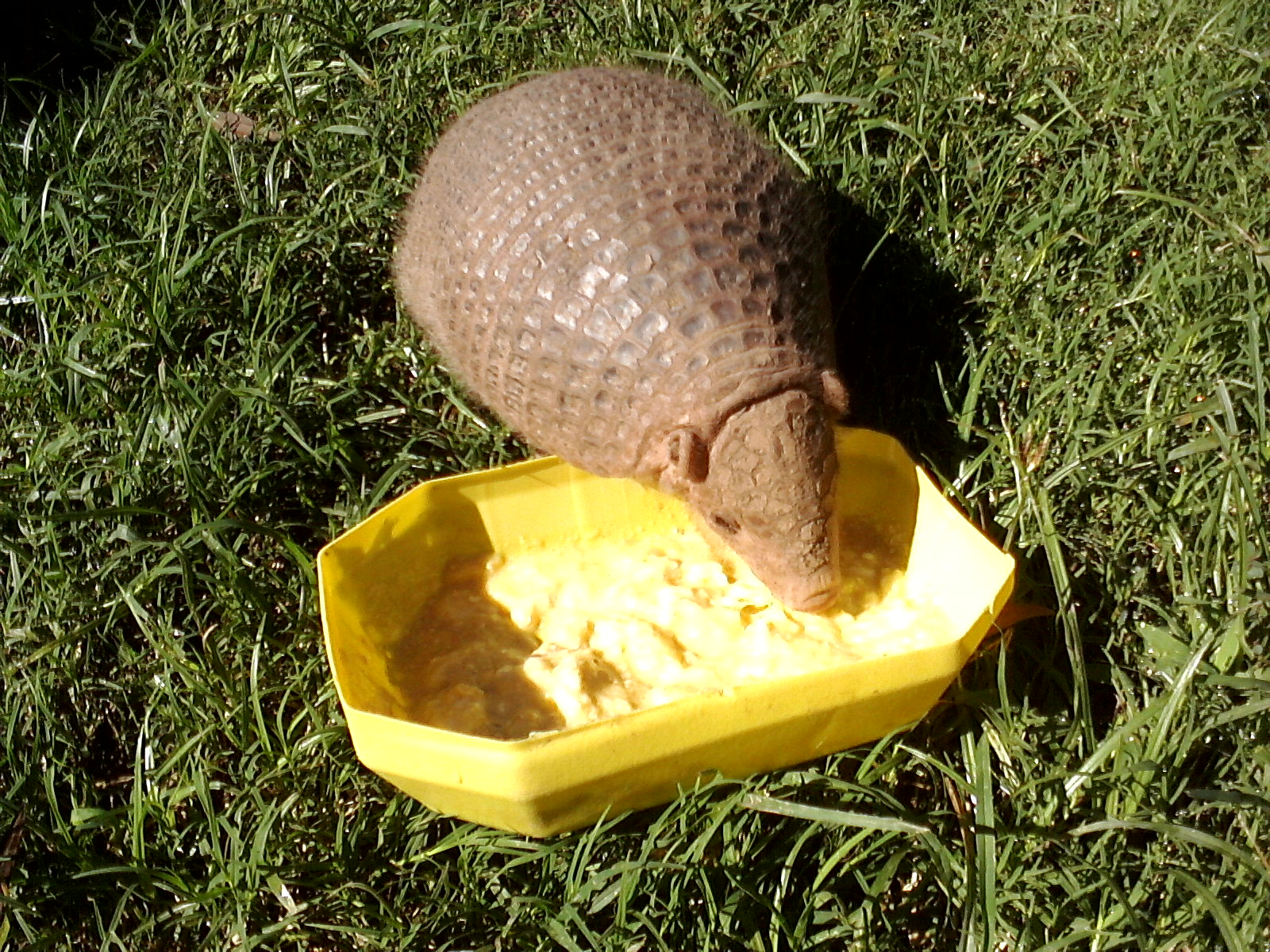

Conservation status
- Near Threatened (IUCN 3.1)

Scientific classification
- Kingdom: Animalia
- Phylum: Chordata
- Class: Mammalia
- Order: Cingulata
- Family: Chlamyphoridae
- Subfamily: Tolypeutinae
- Genus: Cabassous
- Species: C. chacoensis

Binomial name
- Cabassous chacoensis Wetzel, 1980
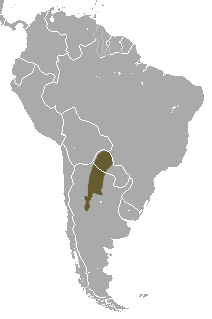
- Chacoan naked-tailed armadillo range

= Chacoan naked-tailed armadillo =

Species of mammal

The Chacoan naked-tailed armadillo (Cabassous chacoensis) is a species of South American armadillo.

It is the smallest of the naked-tailed armadillos, having an average head-body length of 30 cm (12 in), while the other species range from 32 to 46 cm (13 to 18 in). They also have smaller ears than the other species, and their ears also have a distinctive fleshy expansion on the forward edge that other species lack.

As its name suggests, the Chacoan naked-tailed armadillo is found in the Gran Chaco region of western Paraguay and north-central Argentina. It may also be found in Bolivia, and possibly Brazil. Within this region, it is more likely to be found in semi-arid, rather than humid, habitats, typically inhabiting open thorn forest and scrub.

Little is known of its biology and behaviour, although it is known to be nocturnal, and an active burrower. They feed primarily on ants and termites. They have been reported to make a grunting call, and to give birth to a single young at a time.
