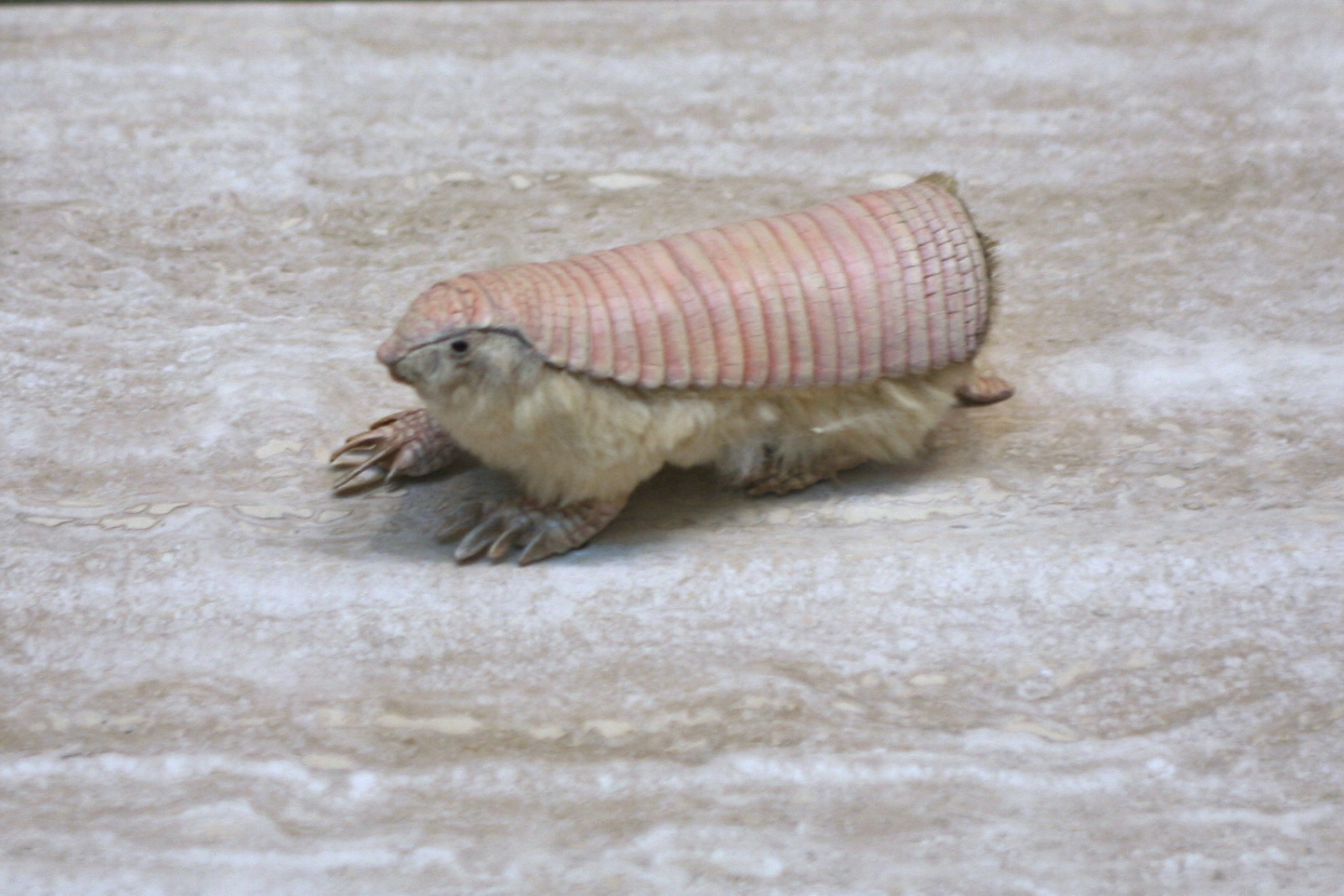

Conservation status
- Data Deficient (IUCN 3.1)

Scientific classification
- Kingdom: Animalia
- Phylum: Chordata
- Class: Mammalia
- Order: Cingulata
- Family: Chlamyphoridae
- Subfamily: Chlamyphorinae
- Genus: Chlamyphorus; Harlan, 1825
- Species: C. truncatus

Binomial name
- Chlamyphorus truncatus Harlan, 1825
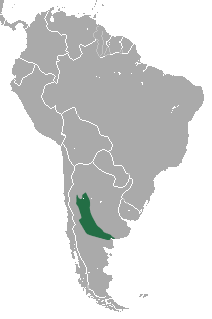
- Pink fairy armadillo range

= Pink fairy armadillo =

Species of armadillo

The pink fairy armadillo (Chlamyphorus truncatus) is the smallest species of armadillo, first described by Richard Harlan in 1825. The pink fairy armadillo is 90–115 mm (3.5–4.5 in) long, and typically weighs about 120 g (4.2 oz). This solitary, desert-adapted animal is endemic to the deserts and scrub lands of central Argentina. The pink fairy armadillo is closely related to the only other fairy armadillo (Chlamyphorinae), the greater fairy armadillo.

Pink fairy armadillos have small eyes, silky yellowish white fur, and flexible dorsal shells that are attached to their bodies solely by thin dorsal membranes. Their spatula-shaped tails protrude from vertical plates at the blunt rear of their shells. They exhibit nocturnal and solitary habits and feed themselves largely on insects, worms, snails, and various plant parts. The pink fairy armadillo has a unique ability to bury itself in a matter of seconds, using its specialized claws to dig into sandy or loamy soils. This behavior helps protect the armadillo from predators and extreme temperatures, as well as conserve moisture in its arid habitat.

The conservation status of pink fairy armadillos is uncertain, and it is listed as Data Deficient by the IUCN Red List of Threatened Species. The decline in population for this species has generally been attributed to farming activities and predators, including domestic dogs and cats. Pink fairy armadillos are found less commonly than they were a few decades ago, and the field sightings have been rare and incidental.

Individuals caught in the wild had a tendency to die during or a couple of days after transport from their natural habitat to captive facilities. There is a sole record for the longevity of a pink fairy armadillo that was held in captivity for more than four years; however, that particular case lacks a scientific description.

Armadillos' evolutionary distinctiveness, combined with their restricted geographic range, ongoing threats, and rarity, makes conservation extremely urgent for these species.

== Evolutionary origins ==
Currently, fairy armadillos have the least molecular data available among all families of armadillos. The subfamily Chlamyphorinae includes only two extant species: Chlamyphorus truncatus, the pink fairy armadillo, and Calyptophractus retusus, the greater fairy armadillo. These two species are morphologically similar: both have notably reduced eyes and reinforced forearms that support enlarged digging claws. They are also one of the few mammals that lack visible external ears. Both species are specialized to a subterranean lifestyle which was developed in their ancestral lineage sometime between 32 and 17 Mya.

Both species have geographically separated distributions, and both are strictly nocturnal, but the details of their ecology and their population biology remain unknown. The similarities can be explained either by the presence of a shared common ancestry, which would place both species in the same clade (making them monophyletic), or by the result of adaptive convergence due to extreme selective pressures induced by their lifestyle (suggesting them to be diphyletic). A study in 2012 of several of their genes concluded that they were monophyletic, estimating the split between the two species to have occurred around 17±3 Mya, around the transition between the Early Miocene and the Middle Miocene.

Both species are rare in the field and are fairly elusive, so the phylogenetic affinities of fairy armadillos have been tested only once. Research conducted in 2009 supported the idea that the three previously identified subfamilies Dasypodinae, Euphractinae, and Tolypeutinae of armadillos, which separated shortly after the Eocene-Oligocene transition, were monophyletic. Chlamyphorinae, the subfamily, including the pink fairy armadillo, was found to display phylogenetic affinities with the clade Tolypeutinae. This was a significant step in defining the previously completely unknown phylogenetic position of this armadillo subfamily within Cingulata. Later, the separation of the fairy armadillo subfamily from their sister-group of Tolypeutinae was estimated to have occurred 32±3 Mya.

Fairy armadillos have previously been classified within the subfamily Euphractinae. However, current opinion is that the antiquity and uniqueness of pink fairy armadillos are best accounted for by retaining the subfamily Chlamyphorinae.

== Range and habitat ==
Pink fairy armadillos are nocturnal burrowing mammals endemic to the xeric environment in central Argentina. They have been found south of Mendoza province as well as north of Rio Negro and south of Buenos Aires. This narrow range contains a unique and crucial habitat for the pink fairy armadillo. It lives in scrubby grasslands that display a variety of thin Larrea and Portulaca shrubs during spring and summer periods. It also resides in sandy plains and dunes.

The pink fairy armadillo is classified as a subterranean armadillo that is extremely sensitive to environmental changes and stress. As an example, sudden environmental changes that could affect pink fairy armadillos include temperature and soil quality. In order for them to survive and maintain stability, they must occupy undisturbed places that contain sufficient amounts of compact sand and hiding places. This also refers to possible captivity conditions for this animal due to its desert-adapted characteristics.

== Diet ==
The pink fairy armadillo is classified as a fossorial, generalist, insectivore. Ants and larvae are its main food source while underground. While those are its primary sources of food, armadillos are known to also eat worms, snails, and various insects. If these insects and invertebrates cannot be found, plant leaves and roots make a good secondary dietary option for their underground lifestyle. In captivity, this animal was observed to willingly accept such foods as watermelon, avocado shells with avocado flesh, and a commercial insectivore diet.

== Description ==
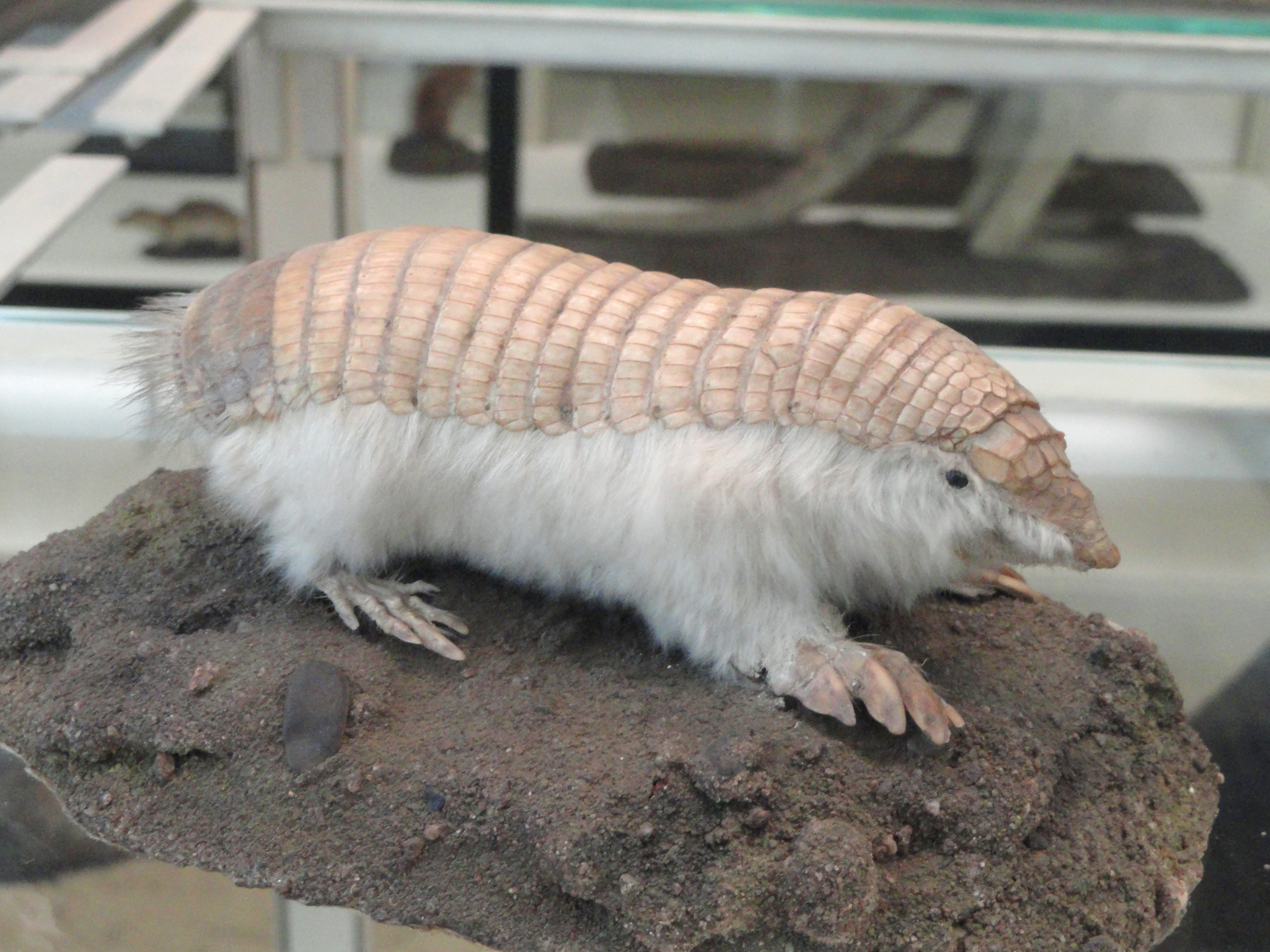
A taxidermied specimen

The pink fairy armadillo is 90–115 mm (3.5–4.5 in) long, and typically weighs about 120 g (4.2 oz). This species is the smallest living armadillo and is among the least known.

=== Thermoregulation and external shell ===
Its fine hair is beneficial for thermoregulation in an environment with highly variable temperatures. Night temperatures in Argentine plains can get very low, and since the armadillo is nocturnal, it needs the fur to conserve heat while it is being active outside its burrow.

Armadillos are well known for leathery shells covering the majority of the dorsal side. The pink fairy armadillo has this characteristic as well, but its shell is much softer and more flexible. Though the shell is close enough to the body for blood vessels to be seen through the armor, this protective part of the animal is only attached via a thin membrane along the spinal column of the animal.The species possesses a unique integumentary system where its dorsal shield, or carapace, is only connected to the body along a median ridge, allowing the entire body beneath the shield to be covered by continuous fur which is hypothesized to provide thermal insulation.

The pink fairy armadillo can curl up to protect the vulnerable soft underside, covered with dense white hair. The armored shell consists of 24 bands that allow the animal to curl up in a ball, and the armor is flattened in the posterior portion of the animal so that it can compress dirt behind it as it is digging. This compression strategy is thought to help prevent tunnel collapses. Lastly, the shell itself is also thought to help with thermoregulation. Since the underlying blood vessels are so close to the surface, the animal can control the amount of functional surface area exposed to the environment to retain or lose heat. Like most armadillos, they rely mostly on a sense of smell to find each other and their prey.

=== Burrowing lifestyle ===
The armadillo has two massive sets of claws on its front and hind limbs, which help it to dig burrows in compacted soil very quickly. The pink fairy armadillo is nicknamed the "sand-swimmer" because it is said that it can "burrow through the ground as fast as a fish can swim in the sea." The claws are relatively large for the size of the animal, hindering its ability to walk on a hard surface.

The arrangement of their hair in the moving bands and the pelvic buckler has been believed to be a biomechanical adaptation. This adaptation allows for an enhancement to their digging ability through the sandy soil.

Along with these unique traits, the pink fairy armadillo has greatly reduced eyes and relies heavily on touch and hearing to navigate. It also has a torpedo-shaped body that reduces the amount of drag it may encounter while working in tunnels and a thick, hairless tail that it uses for balance and stability while using its other limbs to dig.

== Etymology ==
The genus name comes from Ancient Greek χλαμύς (khlamús), meaning "cloak", and φόρος (phóros), "bearing". The specific epithet truncatus means "maimed" in Latin, referring to the species' truncated plates.

== Threats ==
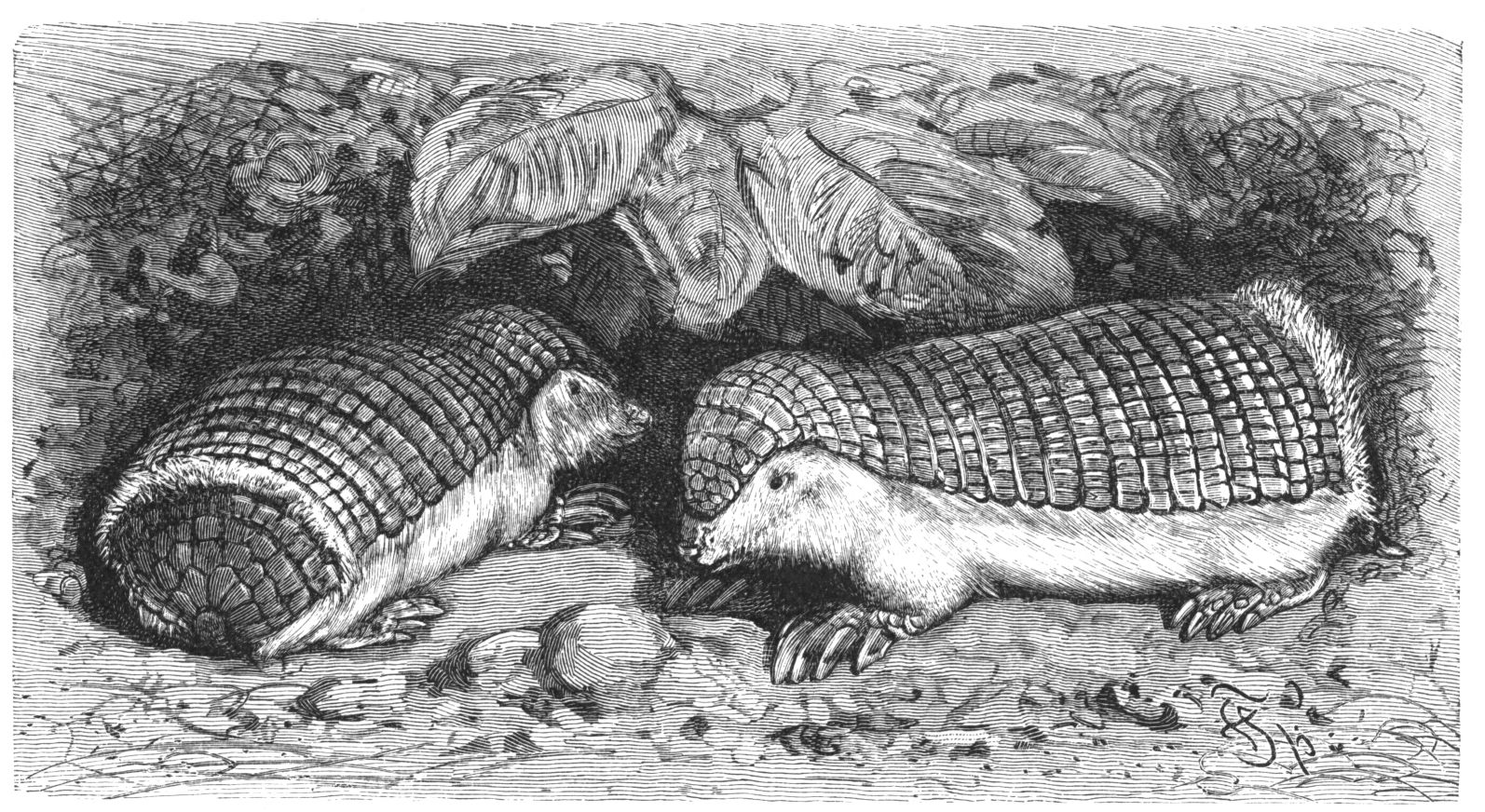
Illustration by Friedrich Specht

As a subterranean dweller, the armadillo is forced to leave its burrows when heavy storms roll in due to the threat of drowning and the risk of wetting its fur. If its fur is wet, the armadillo cannot properly thermoregulate and could experience hypothermia during night hours. Once above ground during a rainstorm, the armadillo is vulnerable to an array of predators. Domestic dogs have greatly preyed on these armadillos. Even their underground homes are not completely safe, as fairy armadillos are preyed upon in their burrows by domestic dogs and cats as well as wild boars.

These armadillos do not do well in captivity. The survival rate is so low that many will die in transport from where they were captured to their new area of captivity. Armadillos that are put into captivity typically do not last longer than a few hours or at most eight days. Not a single specimen has survived more than four years. In spite of the high mortality rate associated with captivity, many are sold illegally on the black market, often as pets.

Pink fairy armadillos are highly susceptible to changes in climate, habitat loss, farmland pesticide usage, and overhunting. Because they inhabit temperate and warm regions, cold temperatures could wipe out their populations due to their low metabolism rate and inability to store fat. As their habitat area is increasingly converted to farmland, the armadillos' burrows not only get plowed over, but the land is no longer habitable for them. The use of pesticides on farmlands is highly concerning because these pesticides adhere to ants, the armadillos' primary source of food. Ingestion of enough of these pesticide-infested ants can be detrimental to their health. Overhunting is one factor that has definitely contributed to the animals' endangerment. Many people in the Americas continue to hunt armadillos for consumption, which is said to be similar to pork in texture and taste.

== Conservation efforts ==
In 2006, the armadillo was placed in the Near-Threatened category on the IUCN Red List. In 2008, it was moved to the Data Deficient category due to the lack of scientific information on its population dynamics and natural history. Field sightings were confirmed to be rare and less common than before, even though the pink fairy armadillo is already difficult to observe due to its nocturnal fossorial lifestyle.

Researchers have found that the pink fairy armadillo is highly susceptible to stress, making the attempts to apply any conservation policies, including taking it out of its natural environment, extremely difficult and largely unsuccessful. Any modifications in its environment, external temperature, or diet are known to trigger stress responses, which are considered to be a possible reason for the failure of captivity attempts.

Many of the armadillos have died during the transportation process from their wild habitat, and many more have only survived several days in captivity. Overall, there are only three reports of captive maintenance of the pink fairy armadillo that are considered successful – in 1970, 1985, and 2009, reporting individuals that lived in captivity for at least 30 months, 22 months, and 8 months, respectively.

This armadillo species is found in several protected areas, including the Lihué Calel National Park. Both national and provincial legislation is in place specifically protecting the species.
