= Machlydotherium =

Machlydotherium Temporal range: Mid Eocene-Early Oligocene (Mustersan-Tinguirirican) ~48–30 Ma

Scientific classification
- Kingdom: Animalia
- Phylum: Chordata
- Class: Mammalia
- Order: Cingulata
- Family: †Pampatheriidae
- Genus: †Machlydotherium; Ameghino, 1902

Type species
- †Machlydotherium asperum Ameghino 1902

Species
- M. asperum Ameghino 1902; M. ater Ameghino 1902; M. intortum Ameghino 1902; M. sparsum Ameghino 1902

Extinct genus of mammals

Machlydotherium is an extinct genus of cingulate of uncertain systematic affinities, perhaps belonging to the Pampatheriidae. It lived from the Middle Eocene to the Early Oligocene, and its fossilized remains were found in South America.

== Description ==
This animal is only known from isolated osteoderms, who were large and thick, quite similar to those of the later pampatheres. Some of these osteoderms, belonging to the fixed carapace typical of many cingulates, show the start of the differentiation of secondary figures, and large central follicles. The mobile osteoderms were distinguished from those of pampatheres by a little differentiated and rough surface. A bilobed tooth, similar to those of pampatheres, but whose abrasion surface draw a cusp in the anterior section, has also been attributed to the genus Machlydotherium.

== Classification ==
The genus Machlydotherium was first described in 1902 by Florentino Ameghino, the name itself being an anagram of Chlamydotherium, another genus of cingulates. The type species, Machlydotherium asperum, dates from the Late Eocene, but osteoderms attributed to the genus have also been found in terrains dated from the Middle Eocene to the Early Oligocene. Ameghino described several species besides the type species, such as Machlydotherium ater, M. sparsum and M. intortum, the latter now erected as its own genus, Yuruatherium.

Due to the scarcity of its remains, its antiquity and the specificities of the shape of its osteoderms, Machlydotherium can hardly be placed in a specific clade of cingulate. It seems to have been close to the pampatheres, the oldest of which only dating back from the Middle Miocene. It is possible that Machlydotherium evolved independently from the pampatheres, becoming extinct without leaving known descendants during the Oligocene.

== Bibliography ==
- F. Ameghino. 1902. Notices préliminaires sur des mammifères nouveaux des terrains Crétacé de Patagonie {preliminary notes on new mammals from the Cretaceous terrains of Patagonia]. Boletin de la Academia Nacional de Ciencias de Córdoba 17:5-70
- G. G. Simpson. 1948. The beginning of the age of mammals in South America. Part I. Bulletin of the American Museum of Natural History 91:1-232
- M. C. McKenna and S. K. Bell. 1997. Classification of Mammals Above the Species Level 1–640
- Ciancio M. R. Carlini A. A. Campbell K. E. Scillato-Yané G. J. . 2013. New Palaeogene cingulates (Mammalia, Xenarthra) from Santa Rosa, Perú and their importance in the context of South American faunas. Journal of Systematic Palaeontology 11:727–741.
