= Macrochorobates =

Macrochorobates Temporal range: Miocene–Pliocene

Scientific classification
- Kingdom: Animalia
- Phylum: Chordata
- Class: Mammalia
- Order: Cingulata
- Family: Chlamyphoridae
- Genus: †Macrochorobates
- Species: †M. scalabrinii

Binomial name
- †Macrochorobates scalabrinii Moreno and Mercerat, 1891

Extinct genus of cingulate

Macrochorobates is an extinct genus of euphractine cingulate that lived in South America during the Miocene and Pliocene epochs.

== Palaeobiology ==
=== Palaeoecology ===
Macrochorobates scalabrinii is interpreted to have had a carnivorous diet intermediate between that of the specialist carnivore Macroeuphractus and the generalist Euphractus.
