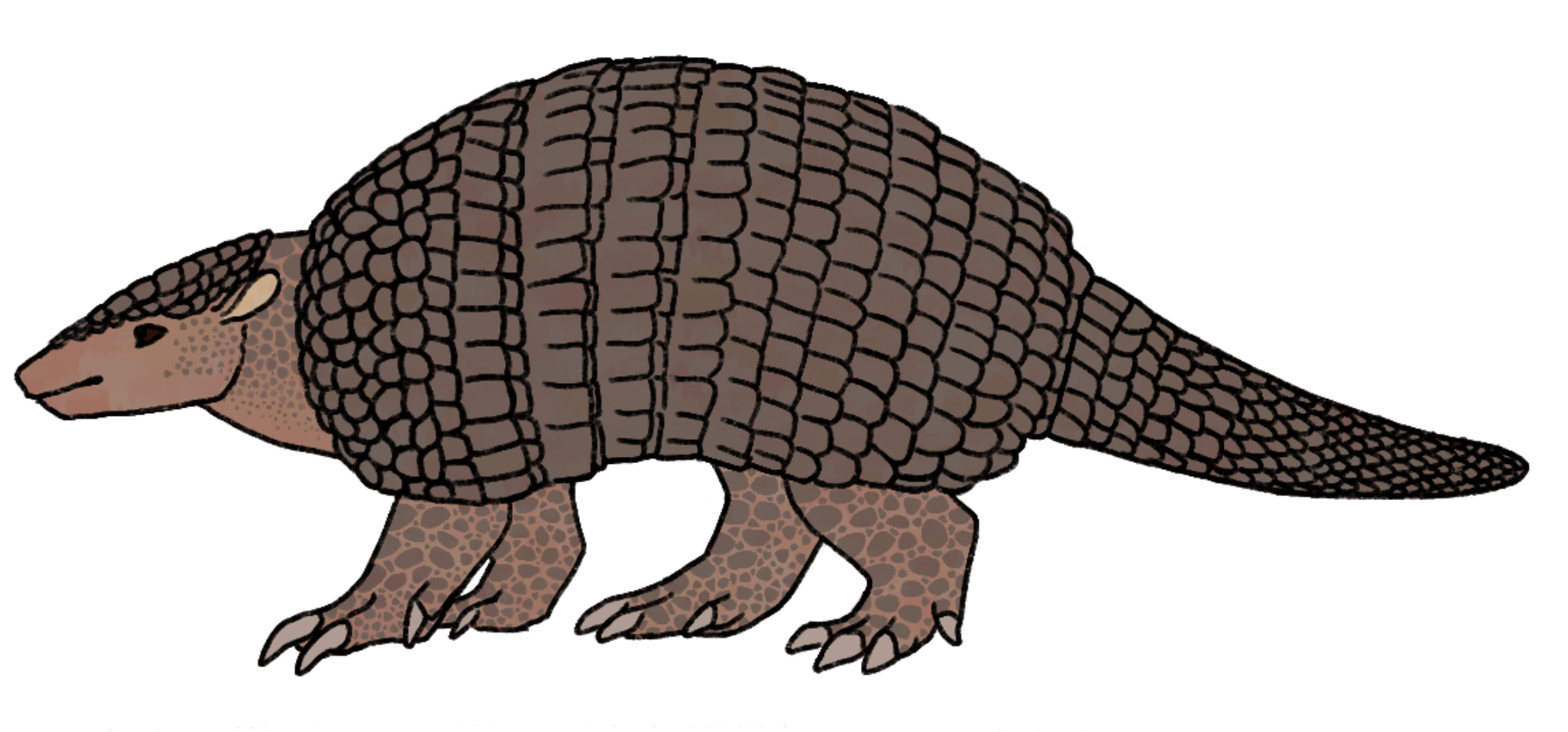
- Life reconstruction of Kraglievichia paranense.

Scientific classification
- Kingdom: Animalia
- Phylum: Chordata
- Class: Mammalia
- Order: Cingulata
- Family: †Pampatheriidae
- Genus: †Kraglievichia; Castellanos, 1927

Type species
- Kraglievichia paranense Ameghino 1883

Species
- K. carinatum Gois et al 2013; K. paranense Ameghino 1883

Synonyms
- Chlamydotherium paranense Ameghino, 1883

= Kraglievichia =

Kraglievichia Temporal range: Late Miocene-Early Pliocene ~9–4 Ma

Extinct genus of mammals

Kraglievichia is an extinct genus of cingulate belonging to the family Pampatheriidae. It lived from the Late Miocene to the Early Pliocene, and its fossilized remains were discovered in South America.

== Description ==
Kraglievichia looked like an enormous armadillo, with body dimensions comparable or larger than the modern giant armadillo; its skull was 18 centimeters long. Though all pampatheres had semi-flexible segmented shells, the structure of the armor forbade them to curl up like modern armadillos can.

Currently, K. paranense is known from several osteoderms, a left femur, and a well-preserved skull without teeth. K. carinatum is known only from osteoderms. The osteoderms of its carapace are distinctively ornamented with an elevated axial area underlined by two lateral longitudinal depressions.

== Classification ==
The genus Kraglievichia was established in 1927 by Castellanos for a species of fossil cingulate first described in 1883 by Florentino Ameghino as Chlamydotherium. The type species, Kraglievichia paranense, is documented in the fossil records in Argentina and Uruguay. The second species, K. carinatum, was originally classified as a member of Scirrotherium. However, due to the more shallow longitudinal depressions in osteoderms of S. hondaensis as compared to those of "S." carinatum, it was reclassified under Kraglievichia.

Kraglievichia was a member of the family Pampatheriidae, a clade of cingulates very similar to modern armadillos, and closely related to them. Compared to most other pampatheres, Kraglievichia is highly derived due to its anatomy and age. Due to their similarities, Kraglievichia and Scirrotherium form the sister group to Holmesina, though Kraglievichia is less closely related to Holmesina than Scirrotherium is. The following cladogram is modified from Jiménez-Lara 2020:

- - - - Kraglievichia paranensis
      - Kraglievichia carinatum
    - - Scirrotherium hondaensis
      - Scirrotherium antelucanus
  - - Holmesina floridanus
    - - Holmesina sepentionalis
      - - Holmesina occidentalis
        - - Holmesina paulacoutoi
          - - Holmesina major
