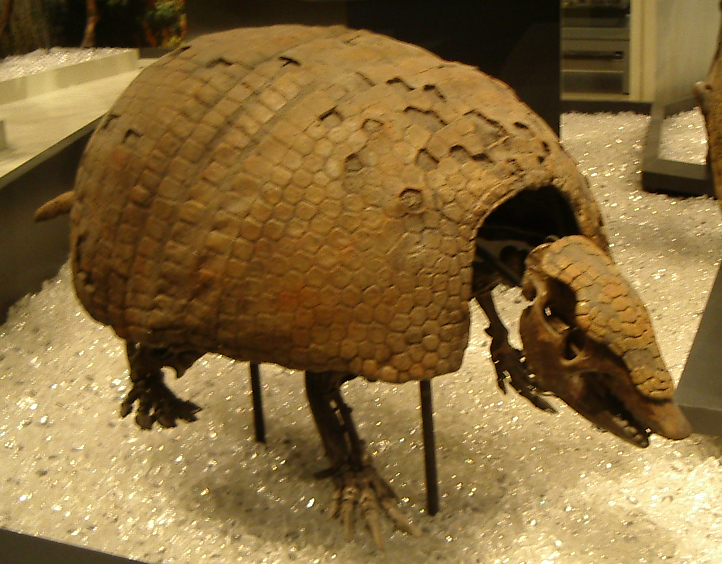
- Holmesina occidentalis

Scientific classification
- Kingdom: Animalia
- Phylum: Chordata
- Class: Mammalia
- Infraclass: Placentalia
- Order: Cingulata
- Family: †Pampatheriidae; Paula Couto 1954

Genera
- Holmesina; Kraglievichia; Machlydotherium?; Pampatherium; Plaina; Scirrotherium; Tonnicinctus; Vassallia; Yuruatherium

= Pampatheriidae =

Pampatheriidae Temporal range: Middle Miocene–Holocene

Family of extinct armadillo-like grazing mammals

Pampatheriidae (from the Pampas Plain, and Ancient Greek θηρίον (theríon), meaning "beast") is an extinct family of large xenarthran cingulates related to armadillos. They first appeared in South America during the mid-Miocene, and Holmesina and Pampatherium spread to North America during the Pleistocene after the formation of the Isthmus of Panama as part of the Great American Interchange. They became extinct as part of the end-Pleistocene extinction event, about 12,000 years ago.

== Taxonomy ==
The placement of the Eocene genus Machlydotherium in the family is considered doubtful. The oldest undoubted member of the group is Scirrotherium from La Venta, Colombia, dating to the mid-Miocene. Analysis of ear morphology suggests that they are most closely related to the much larger glyptodonts, which genetic evidence indicates is nested with modern armadillos as part of the family Chlamyphoridae, which by extension also places pampatheres within this group.

Phylogeny after Tambusso et al. (2021):

- Cingulata
  - Dasypodidae
  - - Euphractinae
    - - Chlamyphorinae
      - Tolypeutinae
      - - †Pampatheres
        - †Glyptodonts

== Description ==
Pampatheres are believed to have attained a weight of up to 200 kg (440 lb). Like three-banded armadillos, and unlike glyptodonts, their armored shell was given some flexibility by three movable lateral bands of scutes. The osteoderms (bony plates in the skin comprising the armor) of pampatheres were each covered by a single keratinized scute, unlike osteoderms of armadillos, which have more than one scute.

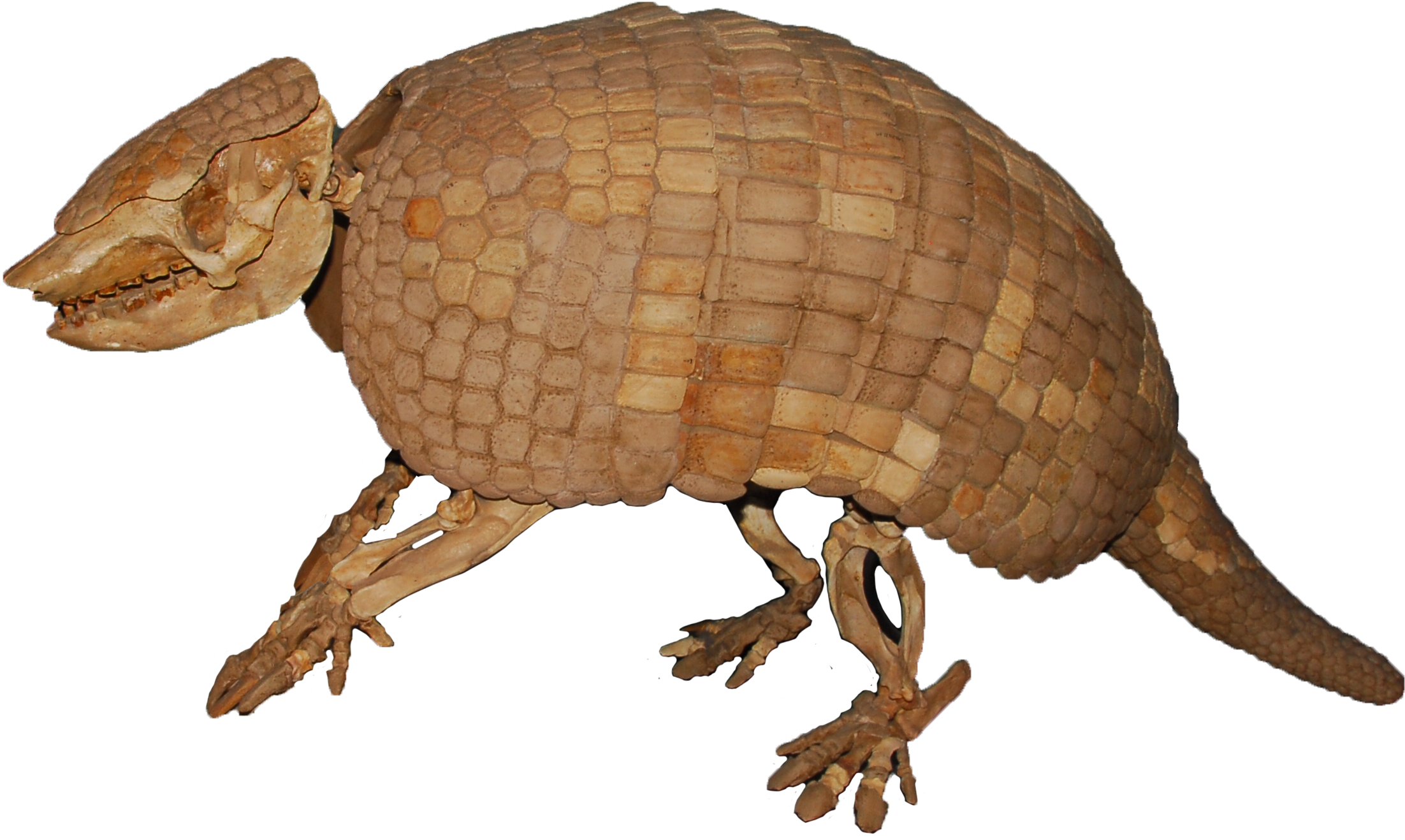
Holmesina floridanus cast skeleton

A study of pampathere jaw biomechanics showed that their masticatory musculature was more powerful and more adapted for transverse movements than that of armadillos, leading to the conclusion that much of their diet was coarse vegetation. They are thought to have been primarily grazers, unlike armadillos, which are omnivorous or insectivorous. The variation between species in the expression of adaptations for grinding coarse vegetation correlates with the aridity of their habitat; such adaptations are most pronounced in Pampatherium typum, which lived in the arid Pampas, and least pronounced in Holmesina occidentalis, which lived in humid lowlands.

== Distribution ==
Pampatheres were widely distributed across South America during the Pleistocene ranging from northern Argentina, eastwards to northeastern Brazil, and westwards to Colombia and Peru. As part of the Great American Interchange, pampatheres dispersed northwards into Central and North America, with members of the genus Holmesina reaching the United States, as far north as Kansas, and as far east as Florida and South Carolina.
