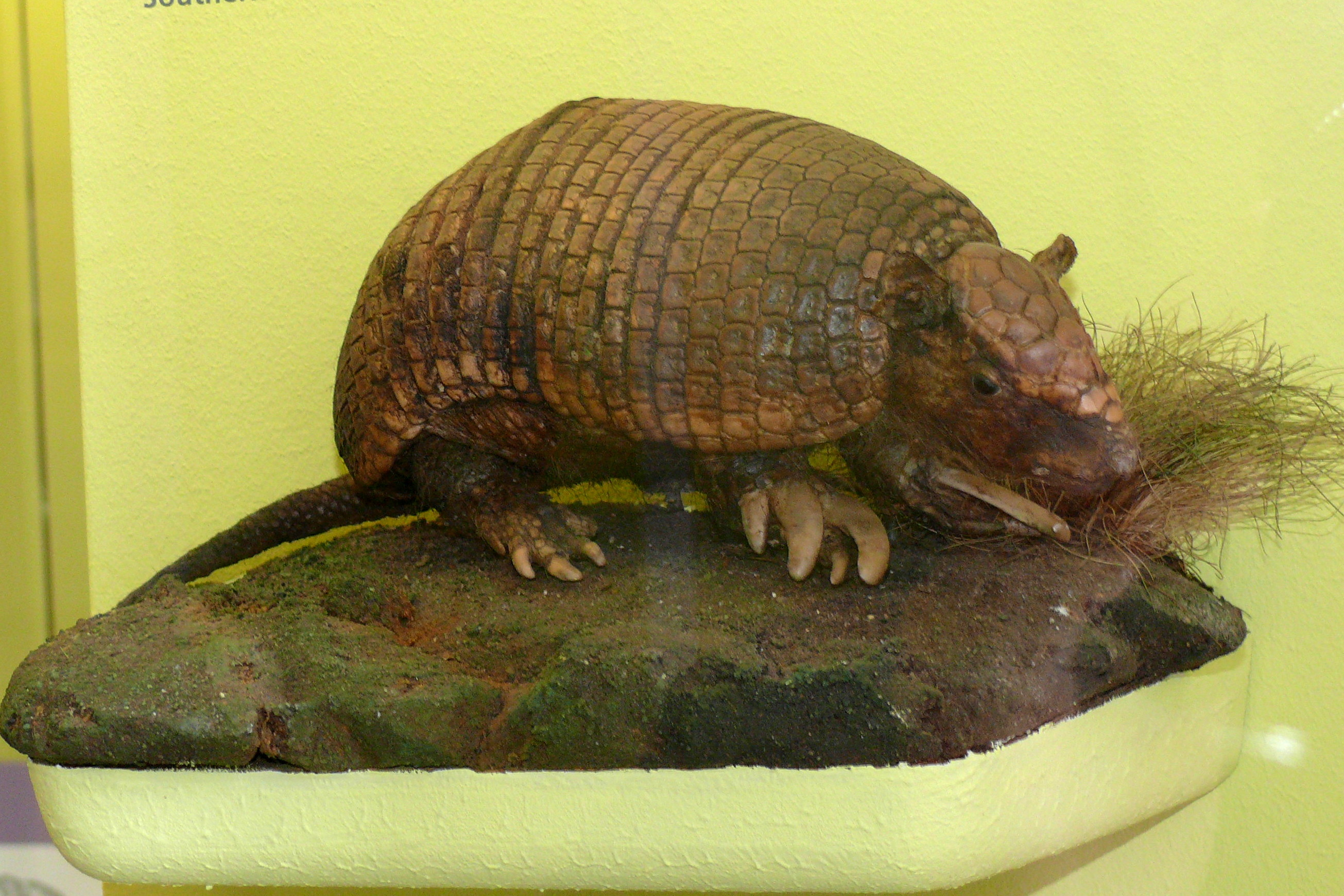

Conservation status
- Least Concern (IUCN 3.1)

Scientific classification
- Kingdom: Animalia
- Phylum: Chordata
- Class: Mammalia
- Order: Cingulata
- Family: Chlamyphoridae
- Subfamily: Tolypeutinae
- Genus: Cabassous
- Species: C. unicinctus

Binomial name
- Cabassous unicinctus (Linnaeus, 1758)
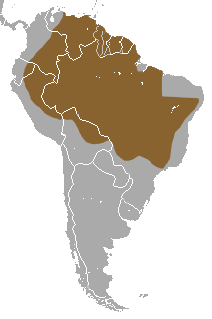
- Southern naked-tailed armadillo range

Synonyms
- Dasypus unicinctus Linnaeus, 1758

= Southern naked-tailed armadillo =

Species of mammal

The southern naked-tailed armadillo (Cabassous unicinctus) is a species of small armadillo from South America.

== Description ==
Smaller than some other armadillos, males measure an average of 36 cm (14 in) in head-body length, and weigh around 3.0 kg (6.6 lb), while females are larger, measuring 38 cm (15 in) and weighing 3.8 kg (8.4 lb). The tail measures around 16 cm (6.3 in) in both sexes, and has only tiny scales in its skin, unlike the larger scutes found in most other armadillo species.

The upper body is covered by a dark grey bony carapace of squarish scutes. In the mid part of the body, this carapace is divided into a series of ten to thirteen mobile rings, giving the animal some degree of flexibility. Although there are some bristly hairs around the margins of the scutes, the tail and underside of the animal are hairless. The armour covers the back of the neck and extends onto the head between the ears. Smaller and thinner scales are also found on the cheeks and the outer surface of the ears. The snout is relatively short, and the ears large and funnel-like. There are five clawed toes on each foot, with the middle claws on the forefeet being particularly large.

== Distribution and habitat ==
Southern naked-tailed armadillos are found throughout northern South America east of the Andes, as far south as northern Paraguay and southern Brazil. They inhabit a range of habitats across this region, from tropical rain forest to swamp, cerrado, and open grasslands.

Two subspecies are recognised:

- Cabassous unicinctus squamicaudis Lund, 1845 – south of the Amazon River
- Cabassous unicinctus unicinctus Linnaeus, 1758 – north of the Amazon

== Biology and behaviour ==
Southern naked-tailed armadillos are solitary, and are said to be nocturnal in the tropics but have been reported to be diurnal further south. As are many armadillos, it is an insectivore, feeding almost entirely on ants and termites. Reproduction occurs year-round, and animals have lived up to seven years in captivity.

The armadillos spend much of their time burrowing, digging burrows about 16 cm (6.3 in) in diameter. The outer parts of the burrow are rounded, since the animal initially rotates its body as it digs, but they become flatter about 45 cm (18 in) in from the entrance. They are typically located in termite mounds.
