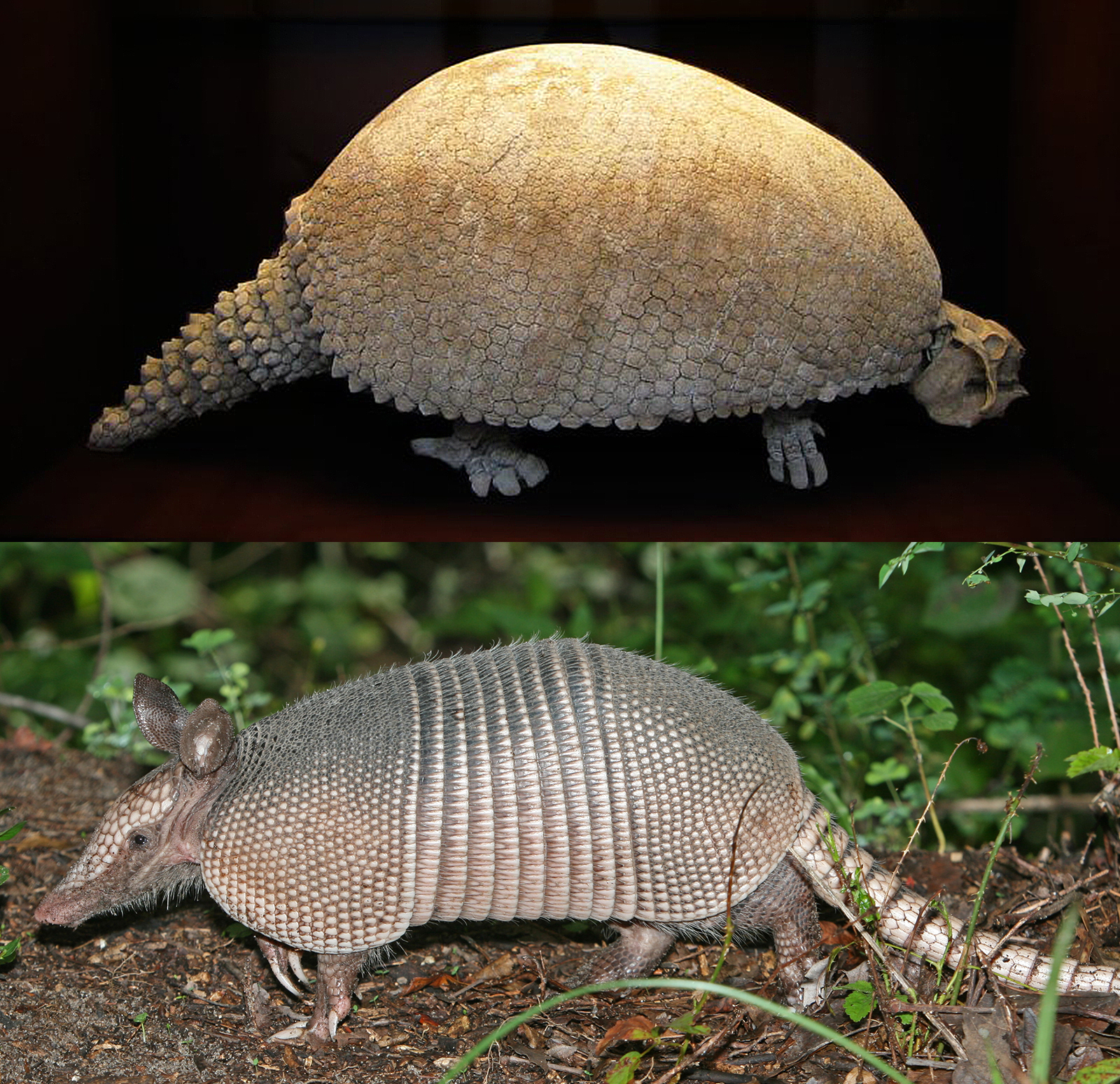
- Glyptodon (Vienna) and Dasypus novemcinctus

Scientific classification
- Kingdom: Animalia
- Phylum: Chordata
- Class: Mammalia
- Superorder: Xenarthra
- Order: Cingulata; Illiger, 1811

Subclades and Families
- †Paracingulata Casali et al., 2026; †Palaeopeltidae; †Peltephilidae; Eucingulata Casali et al., 2026; Dasypodoidea; Dasypodidae; †Pucatheriidae; Chlamyphoroidea; Glyptophracta; Euphracta; Tolypeutidae; Chlamyphoridae; Euphractidae; †Glyptodonta; †Pampatheriidae; †Glyptatelidae; †Pachyarmatheriidae; †Glyptodontidae
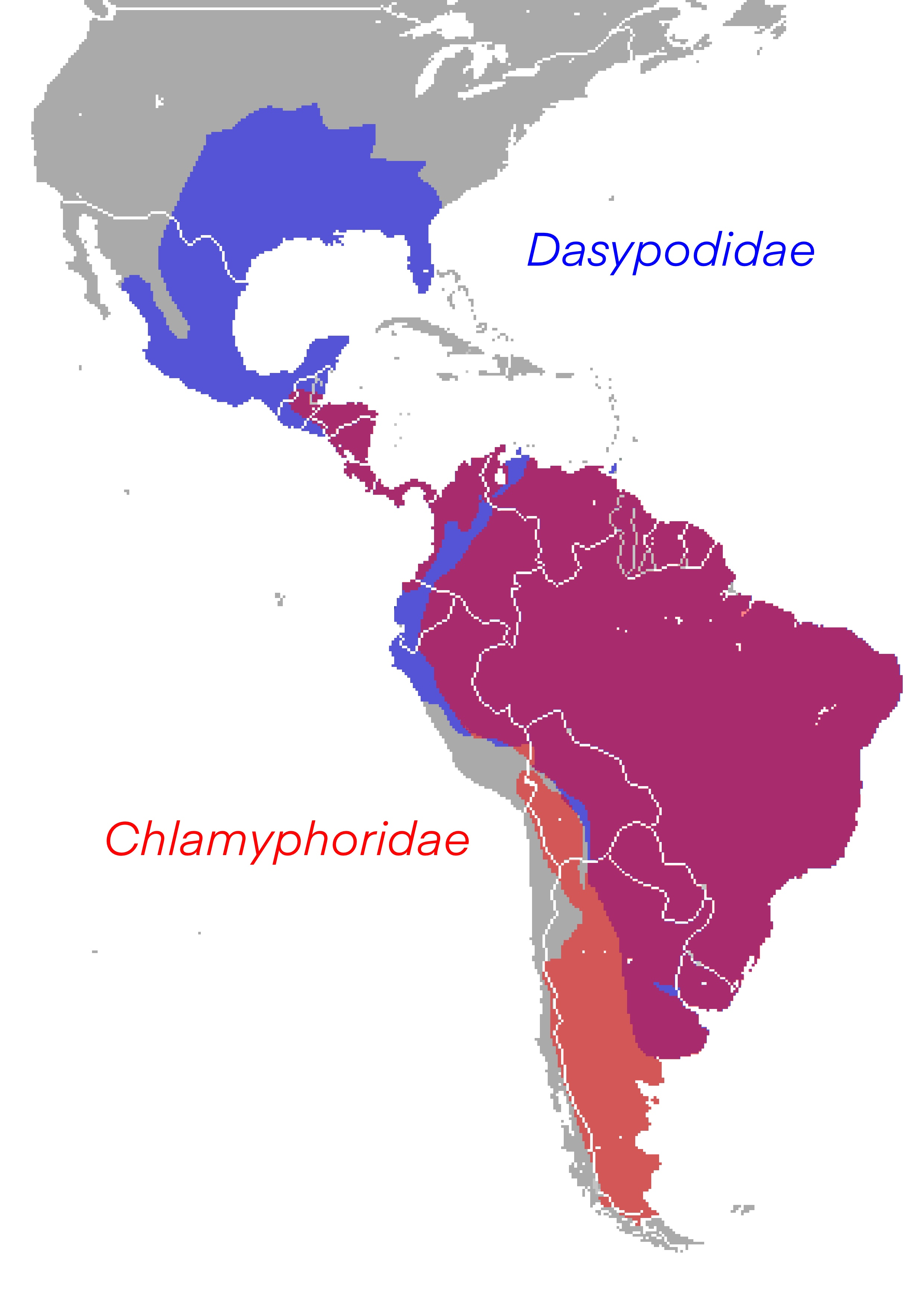

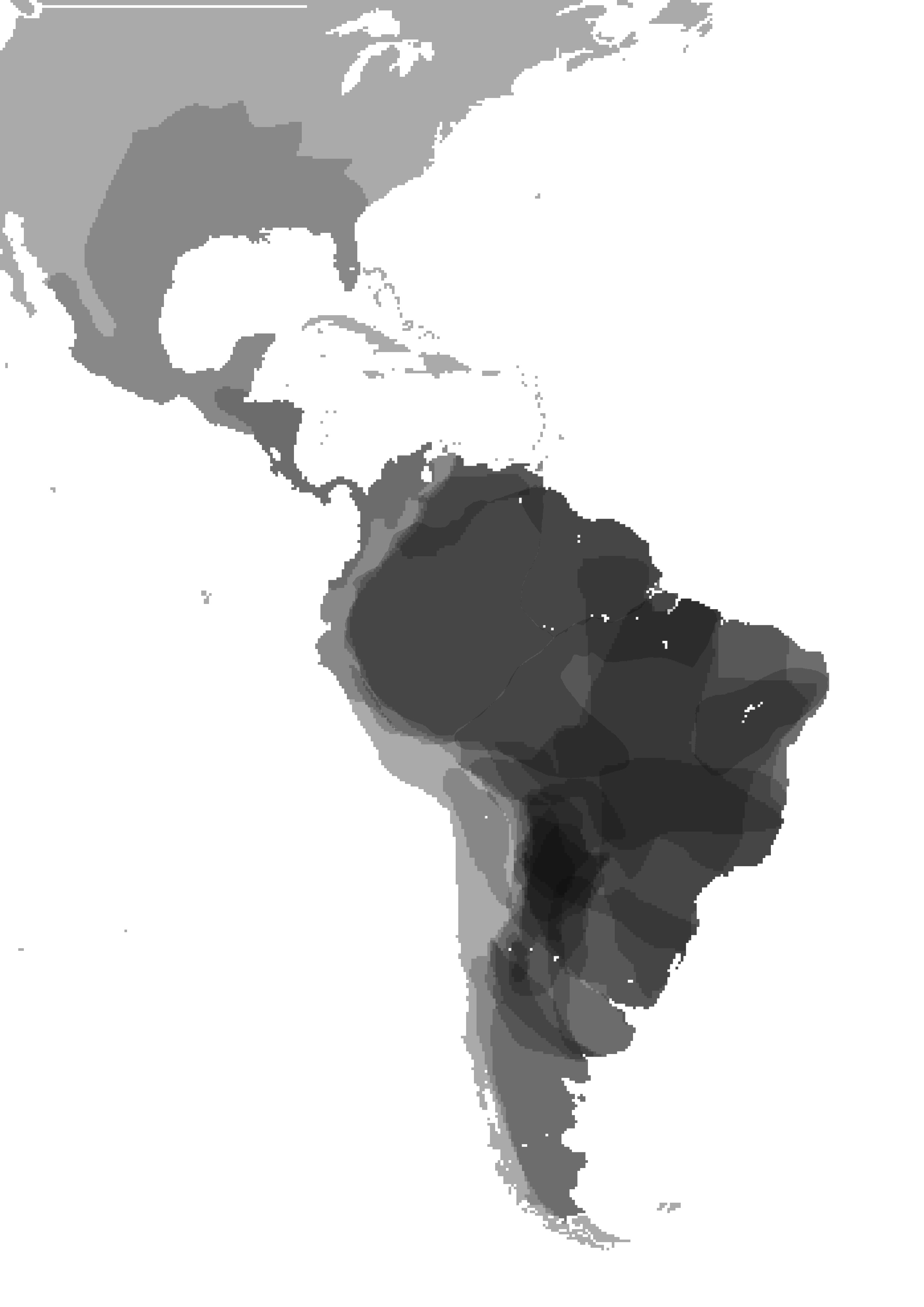
- The distribution and density of Cingulata species

= Cingulata =

Cingulata Temporal range: Late Paleocene-Recent, 58.7–0 Ma

Order of armored mammals from the Americas

Cingulata, part of the superorder Xenarthra, is an order of armored New World placental mammals. The armadillos, whose species are split between the families Dasypodidae and Chlamyphoridae, are the only surviving members of the order. Two groups of cingulates much larger than extant armadillos (maximum body mass of 45 kg (100 lb) in the case of the giant armadillo) existed until recently: pampatheriids, which reached weights of up to 200 kg (440 lb) and chlamyphorid glyptodonts, which attained masses of 2,000 kg (4,400 lb) or more.

The cingulate order originated in South America during the Paleocene epoch about 66 to 56 million years ago, and due to the continent's former isolation remained confined to it during most of the Cenozoic. However, the formation of a land bridge allowed members of all three families to migrate to southern North America during the Pliocene or early Pleistocene as part of the Great American Interchange. After surviving for tens of millions of years, all of the pampatheriids and giant glyptodonts apparently died out during the Quaternary extinction event at the beginning of the Holocene, along with much of the rest of the regional megafauna, shortly after the colonization of the Americas by Paleo-Indians.

== Description ==
Armadillos have dorsal armor that is formed by osteoderms, plates of dermal bone covered in relatively small, overlapping keratinized epidermal scales called "scutes". Most species have rigid shields over the shoulders and hips, with three to nine bands separated by flexible skin covering the back and flanks.

Pampatheres also had shells that were flexible due to three movable lateral bands of osteoderms. The osteoderms of pampatheres were each covered by a single scute, unlike those of armadillos, which have more than one. Glyptodonts, on the other hand, had rigid, turtle-like shells of fused osteoderms.

Both groups have or had a cap of armor atop their heads. Glyptodonts also had heavily armored tails; some, such as Doedicurus, had mace-like clubs at the ends of their tails, similar to those of ankylosaurs, evidently used for defensive or agonistic purposes.

Most armadillos eat insects and other invertebrates; some are more omnivorous and may also eat small vertebrates and vegetable matter. Pampatheres are thought to have been specialized for grazing, and isotopic analysis indicates the diet of glyptodonts was dominated by C4 grasses. Euphractinae is unique for speciations towards carnivory, culminating in the macropredatory genus Macroeuphractus.

== Classification ==
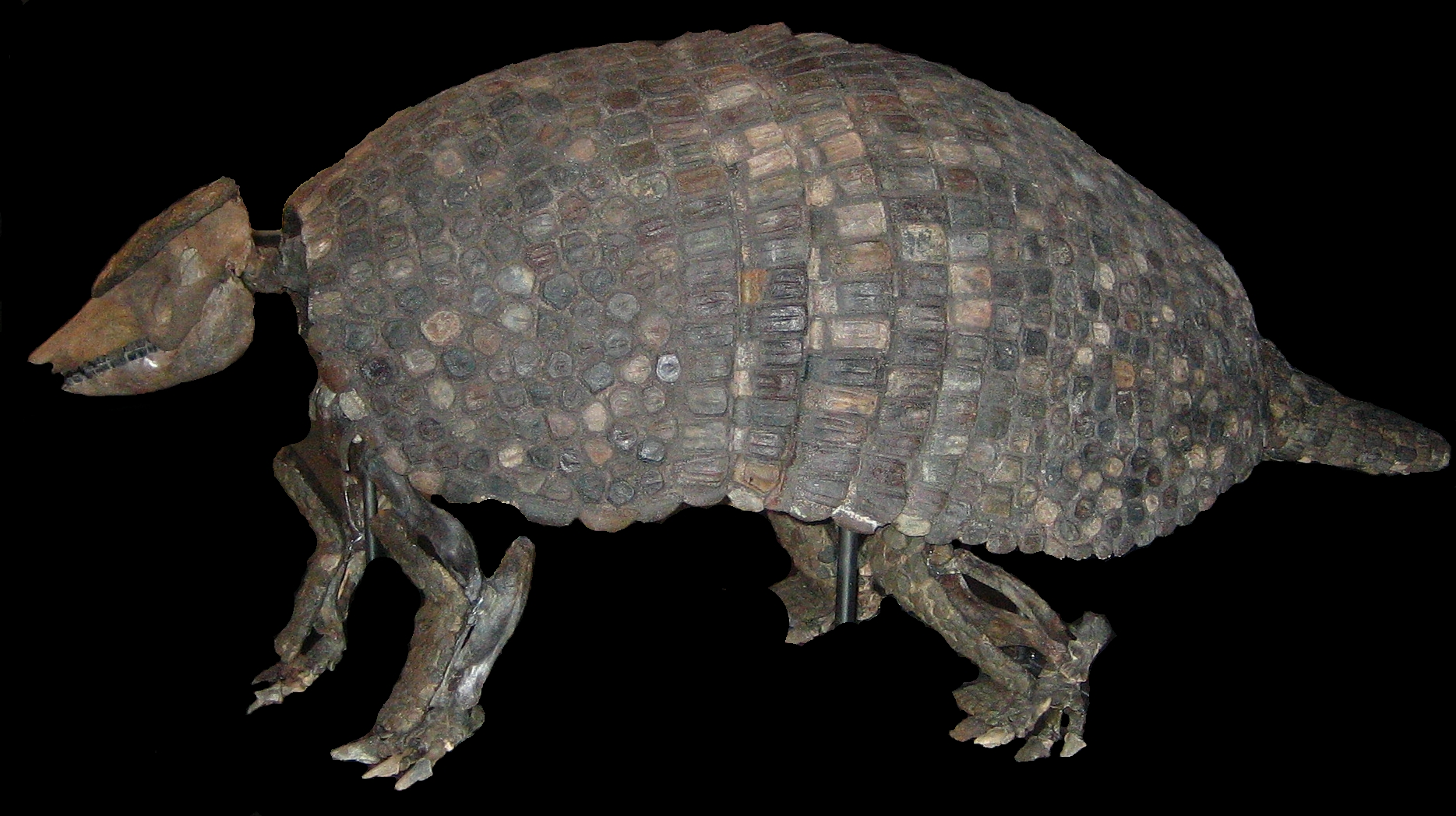
Holmesina septentrionalis (Barcelona)

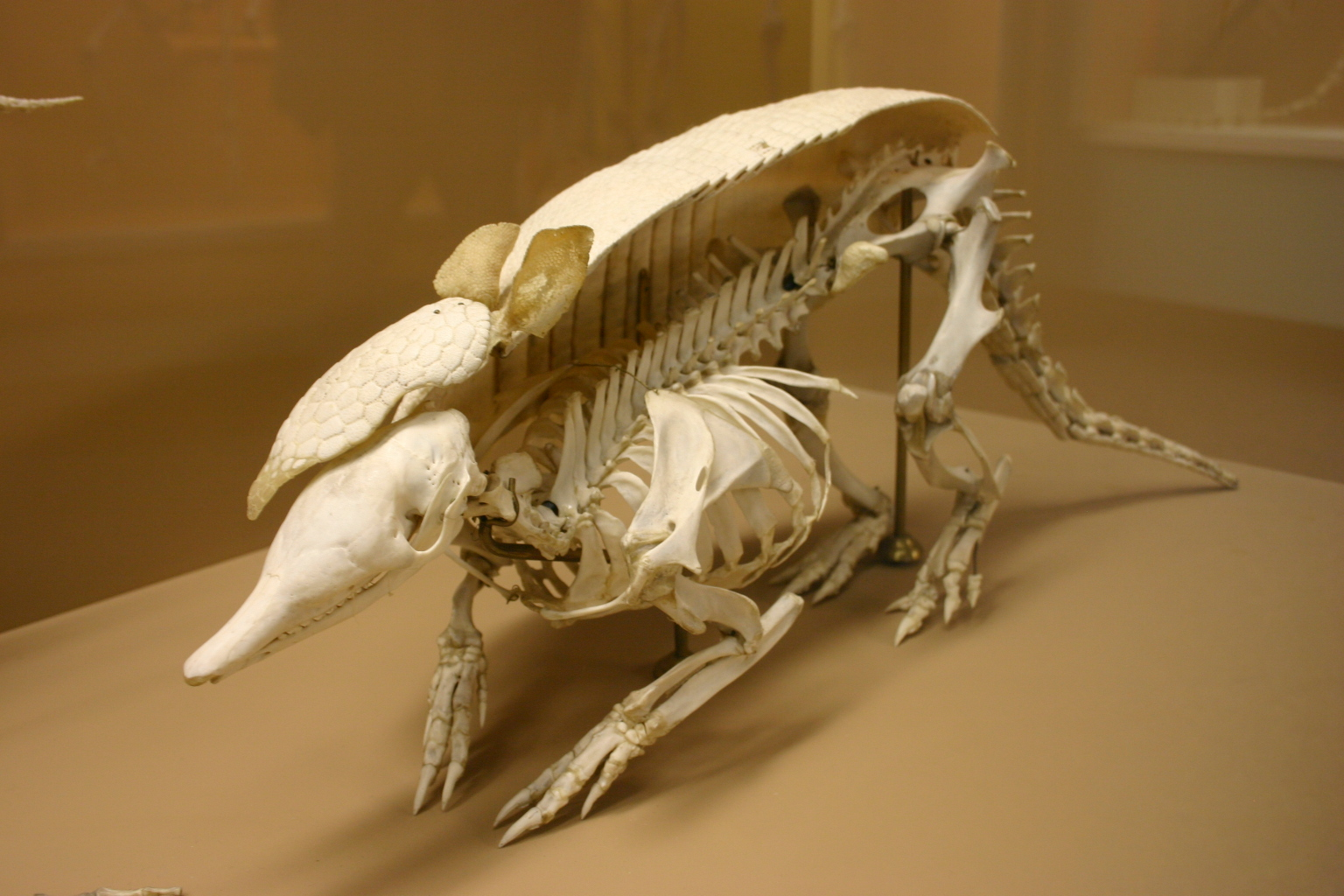
Nine-banded armadillo, D. novemcinctus (Smithsonian)

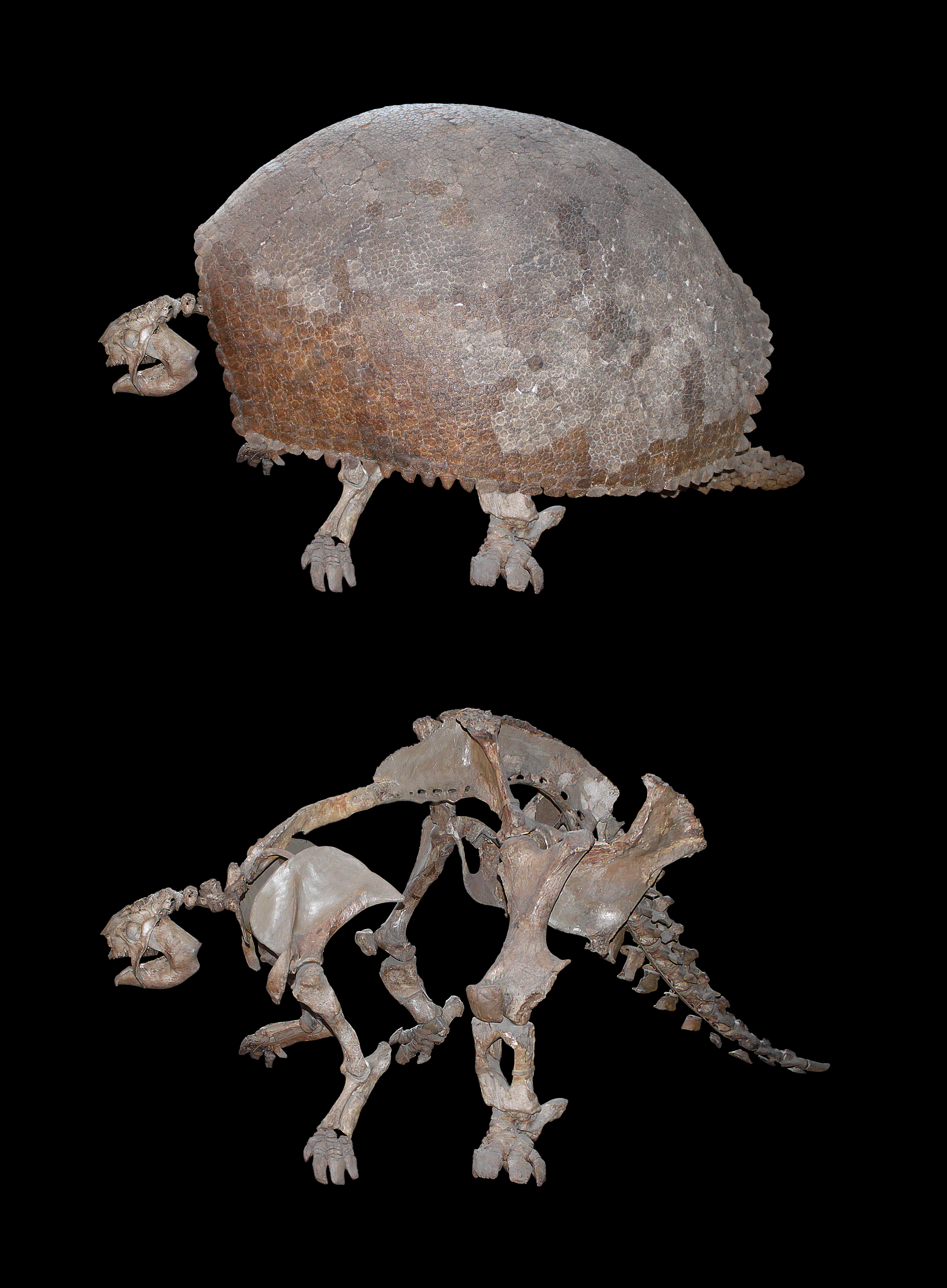
Glyptodon clavipes (Berlin)

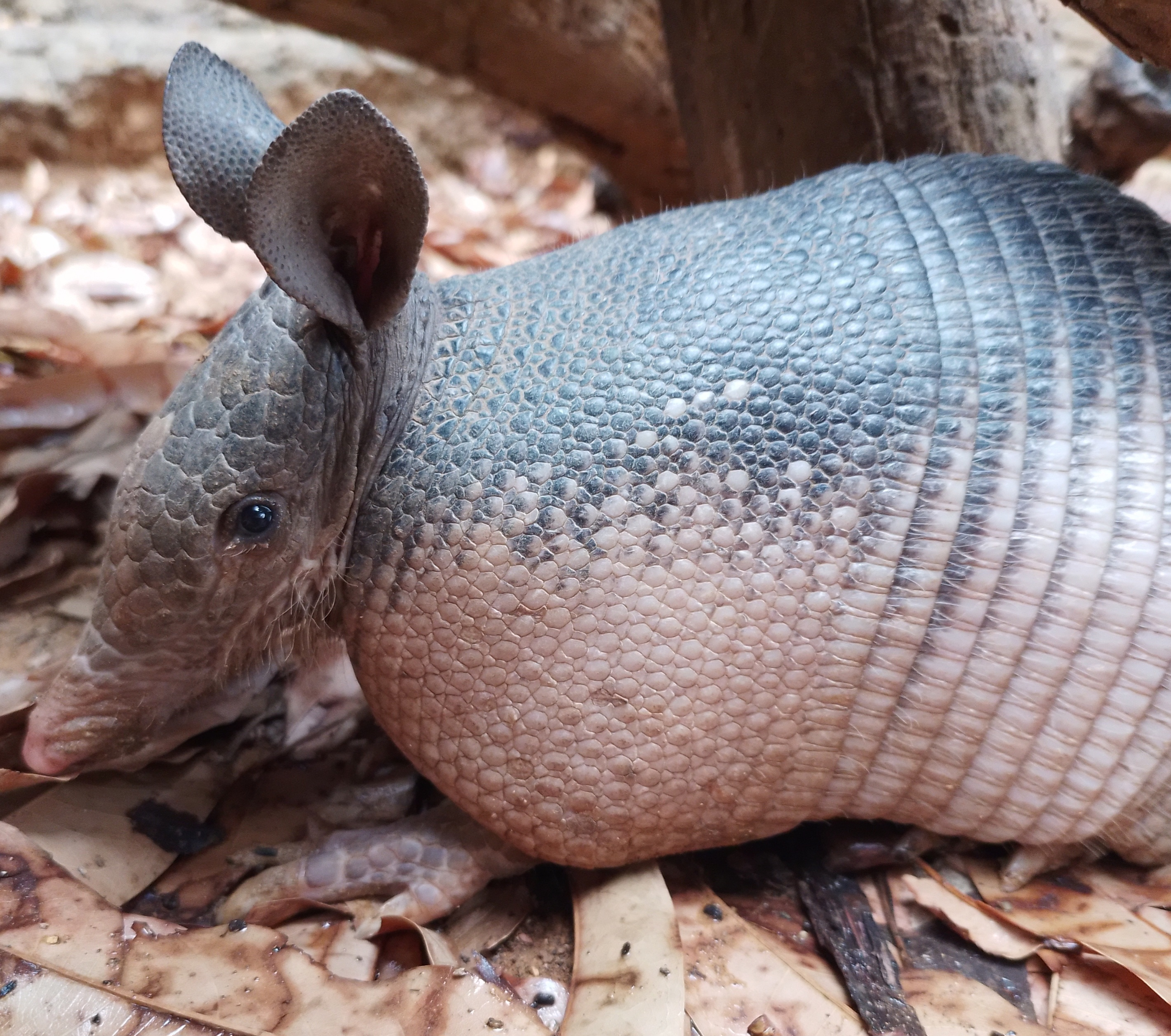

The taxonomic table below follows the results of a phylogenetic analysis published by Delsuc et al., 2016. While glyptodonts have traditionally been considered stem-group cingulates outside the group that contains modern armadillos, this 2016 study conducted an analysis of Doedicurus mtDNA and found that it was, in fact, nested within the modern armadillos as the sister group of a clade consisting of Chlamyphorinae and Tolypeutinae.

Order Cingulata

- Family †Peltephilidae Ameghino 1894
  - Genus †Anantiosodon Ameghino 1891
  - Genus †Epipeltephilus Ameghino 1904
  - Genus †Parapeltecoelus Bordas 1938
  - Genus †Peltecoelus Ameghino 1902
  - Genus †Peltephilus Ameghino 1887 (Horned armadillo)
  - Genus †Ronwolffia Shockey 2017
- Family †Paleopeltidae Ameghino 1895
  - Genus †Palaeopeltis Ameghino 1895
- Family †Pampatheriidae
  - Genus ?†Machlydotherium Ameghino 1902
  - Genus †Holmesina Simpson 1930
  - Genus †Kraglievichia Castellanos 1927
  - Genus †Machlydotherium
  - Genus †Pampatherium Ameghino 1875 ex Gervais & Ameghino 1880
  - Genus †Scirrotherium Edmund & Theodor 1997
  - Genus †Tonnicinctus Góis et al. 2015
  - Genus †Vassallia Castellanos 1927 [Plaina Castellanos 1937]
  - Genus †Yuruatherium Ciancio et al. 2012
- Family †Pachyarmatheriidae Fernicola et al. 2018
  - Genus †Neoglyptatelus Carlini, Vizcaíno & Scillato-Yané 1997
  - Genus †Pachyarmatherium Downing & White 1995
- Family Dasypodidae (long-nosed armadillos)
  - Genus †Acantharodeia
  - Genus †Amblytatus
  - Genus †Archaeutatus
  - Genus †Astegotherium
  - Genus †Barrancatatus
  - Genus †Chasicotatus
  - Genus †Chorobates
  - Genus †Coelutaetus
  - Genus †Eocoleophorus
  - Genus †Epipeltecoelus
  - Genus †Eutatus
  - Genus †Hemiutaetus
  - Genus †Isutaetus
  - Genus †Lumbreratherium
  - Genus †Macrochorobates
  - Genus †Mazzoniphractus
  - Genus †Meteutatus
  - Genus †Pedrolypeutes
  - Genus †Prodasypus
  - Genus †Proeutatus
  - Genus †Prostegotherium
  - Genus †Pucatherium
  - Genus †Punatherium
  - Genus †Stegotherium
  - Genus †Stenotatus
  - Genus †Utaetus
  - Genus †Vetelia
  - Subfamily Dasypodinae
    - Genus †Anadasypus
    - Genus Dasypus
    - Genus †Nanoastegotherium
    - Genus †Parastegosimpsonia
    - Genus †Pliodasypus
    - Genus †Propraopus
    - Genus †Riostegotherium
    - Genus †Stegosimpsonia
- Family Chlamyphoridae: glyptodonts and other armadillos
  - Subfamily Chlamyphorinae: fairy armadillos
    - Genus Calyptophractus
    - Genus Chlamyphorus
  - Subfamily Euphractinae: hairy, six-banded and pichi armadillos
    - Genus Chaetophractus
    - Genus †Doellotatus
    - Genus Euphractus
    - Genus †Macroeuphractus
    - Genus †Proeuphractus
    - Genus †Paleuphractus
    - Genus Zaedyus
  - Subfamily †Glyptodontinae: glyptodonts
    - Genus †Doedicurus
    - Genus †Glyptodon
    - Genus †Glyptotherium
    - Genus †Hoplophorus
    - Genus †Panochthus
    - Genus †Parapropalaehoplophorus
    - Genus †Plaxhaplous
  - Subfamily Tolypeutinae: giant, three-banded and naked-tailed armadillos
    - Genus Cabassous
    - Genus †Kuntinaru
    - Genus Priodontes
    - Genus Tolypeutes

Cladogram of Cingulata

- Cingulata
  - Dasypodidae
    - Dasypus (¿sensu lato?)
      - D. (Hyperoambon)
        - D. kappleri
      - D. (Dasypus) (¿sensu stricto?)
        - - D. septemcinctus
          - D. hybridus
        - - - D. yepesi
            - D. sabanicola
          - - D. novemcinctus
            - D. pilosus
  - Chlamyphoridae
    - - Euphractinae
        - - Euphractus
            E. sexcinctus
        - - Zaedyus
            Z. pichiy
          - Chaetophractus
            - C. villosus
            - - C. nationi
              - C. vellerosus
    - - - - †Glyptodontinae
            - - †Doedicurus
                †D. clavicaudatus
            - †(31 other extinct genera)
        - - Chlamyphorinae
            - - Chlamyphorus
                C. truncatus
            - - Calyptophractus
                C. retusus
          - Tolypeutinae
            - - Priodontes
                P. maximus
            - - Tolypeutes
                - T. tricinctus
                - T. matacus
              - Cabassous
                - C. tatouay
                - - C. chacoensis
                  - - C. centralis
                    - C. unicinctus

Cladogram after Casali et al. 2026:

- Cingulata
  - Paracingulata
    - †Palaeopeltis
    - †Peltephilidae
  - - - Dasypodoidea
        - †Pucatheriidae
        - Dasypodidae (long-nosed/nine banded armadillos)
      - Chlamyphoroidea
        - - †Utaetus
          - †Parutaetus
        - Glytophracta
          - Euphracta
            - Tolypeutidae (incl. giant and three-banded armadillos)
            - - Chlamyphoridae (fairy armadillos)
              - Euphractidae (incl. hairy and six-banded armadillos)
          - †Glyptodonta
            - †Eocoelophorus
            - - †Pampatheriidae
              - - †Glyptatelidae
                - - †Pachyarmatheriidae
                  - †Glyptodontidae
