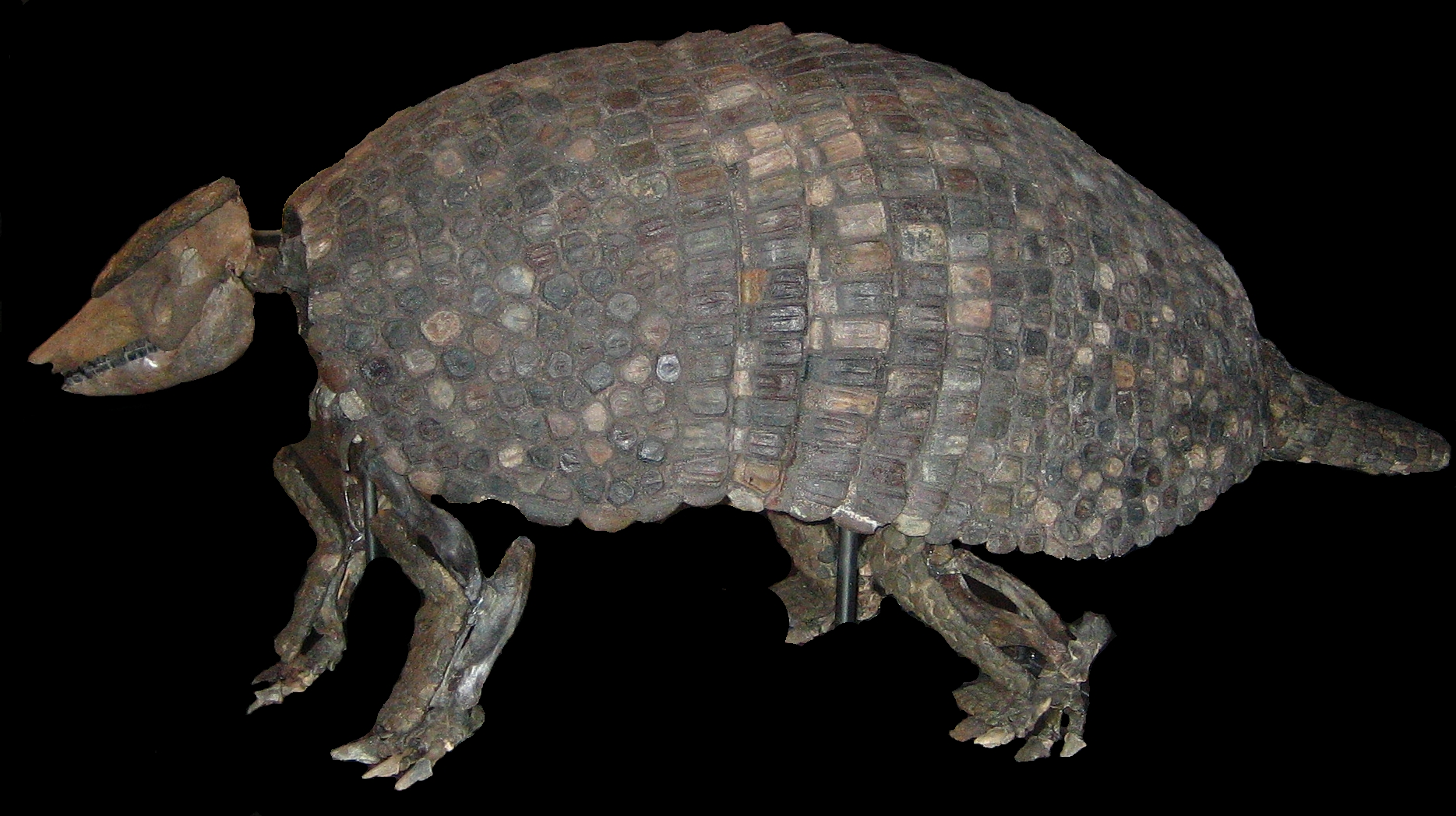
- Fossil skeleton of H. septentrionalis

Scientific classification
- Kingdom: Animalia
- Phylum: Chordata
- Class: Mammalia
- Order: Cingulata
- Family: †Pampatheriidae
- Genus: †Holmesina; Simpson 1930

Species
- †H. cryptae Moura, Gois, Galliari, & Fernandes 2019; †H. floridanus Robertson 1976; †H. major; †H. occidentalis Hoffstetter 1952; †H. paulacoutoi Cartelle & Bohórquez 1985; †H. rondoniensis; †H. septentrionalis Leidy 1889

Synonyms
- Genus synonymy: Chamytherium Martin & Neuner, 1979; Chlamytherium Lund, 1839; Chlamydotherium Lund, 1841; Species synonymy: H. septentrionalis: Chlamytherium septentrionalis Sellards 1915; Glyptodon septentrionalis Leidy 1889

= Holmesina =

Holmesina Temporal range: Early Pliocene-Late Pleistocene (NALMA: Blancan-Rancholabrean) (SALMA: Uquian-Lujanian) ~4.9–0.012 Ma

Extinct genus of armadillo-like mammals

Holmesina is an extinct genus of pampathere, a group of armadillo-like xenarthrans that were distantly related to extant armadillos. Like armadillos, and unlike the other extinct branch of megafaunal cingulates the glyptodonts, the shell was made up of flexible plates which allowed the animal to move more easily.

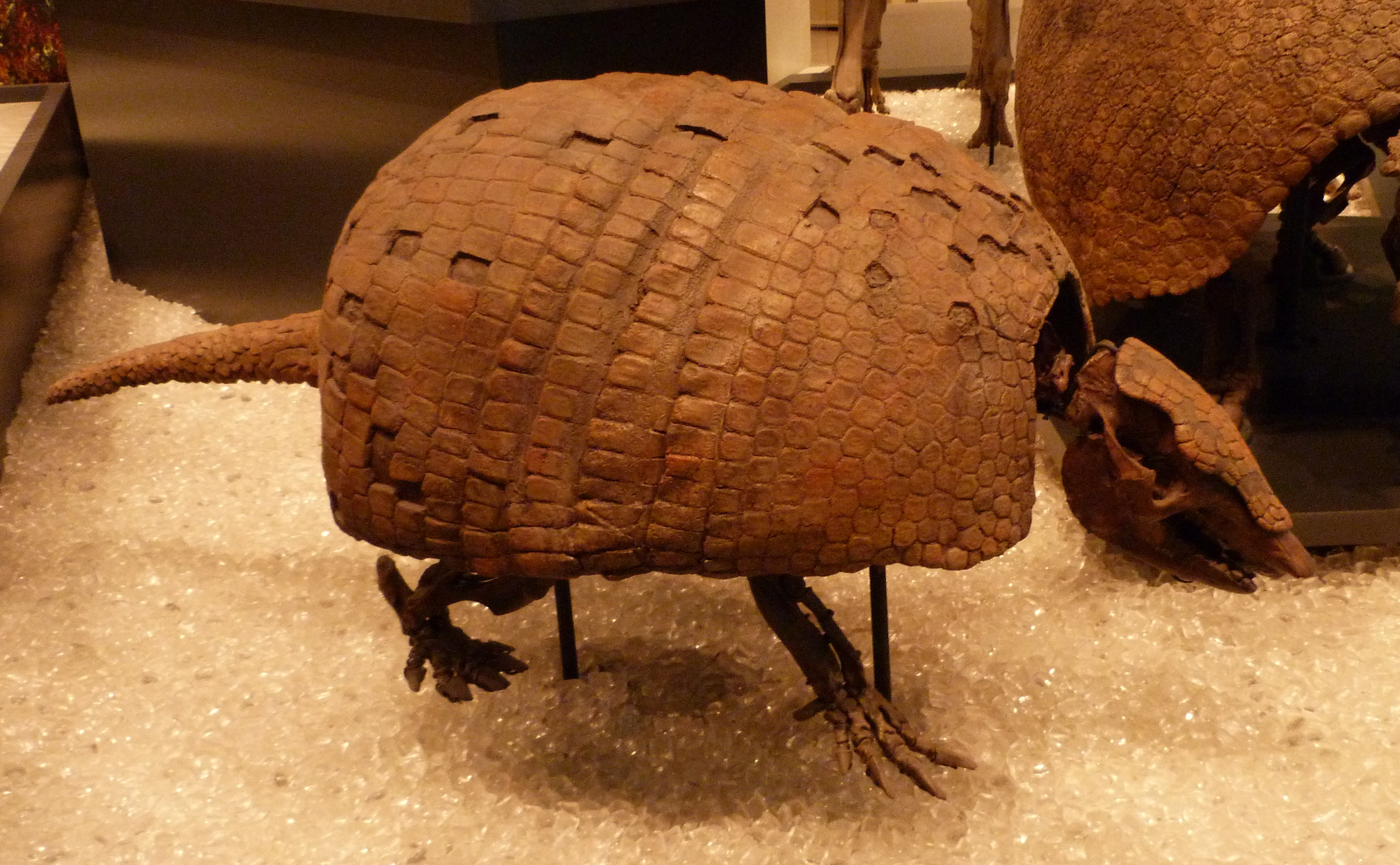
Holmesina occidentalis

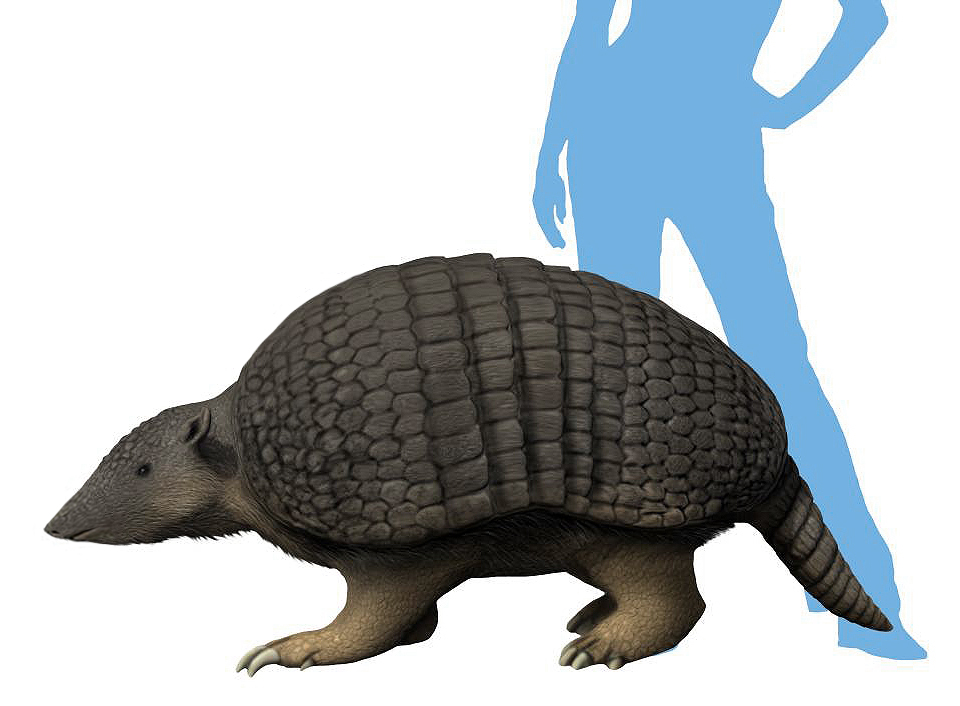
Life reconstruction of Holmesina floridanus and size comparison

Holmesina individuals were much larger than any modern armadillo: They could reach a length of 2 metres (6.6 ft), and a weight of 227 kilograms (500 lb), while the modern giant armadillo does not attain more than 54 kilograms (119 lb).

== Taxonomy ==
Joseph Leidy initially described Holmesina fossils from Florida as Glyptodon septentrionalis in 1889. However, shortly after a close relationship with the pampatheriids was realized, wherein the finds were reassigned to the South American Pampatherium ("Chlamytherium") humboldtii, therein revised to its own species, Chlamytherium septentrionalis, by Elias Howard Sellards in 1915. After additional fossils from Texas were described, George Gaylord Simpson assigned the finds to its own genus, Holmesina, in 1930.

== Distribution ==
They traveled north during the faunal interchange, and adapted well to North America, like the ground sloths, glyptodonts, armadillos, capybaras, and other South American immigrants. During the Late Pleistocene, Holmesina dispersed from North America back into South America, as evidenced by the morphological similarity of Late Pleistocene species in South America. Their fossils are found from Brazil to the United States, mostly in Texas and Florida.

== Diet ==
Holmesina species were herbivores that grazed on coarse vegetation; armadillos are mostly insectivorous or omnivorous. H. paulacoutoi was a generalist plant-eater but had a preference for C_{4} plants; it has been estimated based on δ^{13}C and δ^{18}O values from fossils from Sergipe in Brazil that grasses made up 55% of the diet of H. paulacoutoi, with a further 29% being fruits and 16% being leaves.

== Palaeopathology ==
Three H. cryptae specimens have been described bearing evidence of bacterial and fungal infections, along with sand flea ectoparasitism.
