= Divisaderan =

South American land mammal age

The Divisaderan age is a South American land mammal age, covering a period of geologic time within the Middle or Late Eocene epochs of the Paleogene (>36.0 Ma). It follows the Mustersan age and is followed by the Tinguirirican age.

The Divisaderan is named after the Divisadero Largo Formation of Divisadero Largo, Mendoza, Argentina. It was originally distinguished by an unusual combination of archaic mammals and more recent-looking notoungulate fossils. However, more recent studies argue that the distinctive notoungulates reported from the Divisadero Largo Formation may actually be sourced from the younger (Miocene-age) Mariño Formation. Without these fossils, the Divisaderan may be too poorly-distinguished to stay in use compared to other middle-late Eocene SALMAs.

== Formations ==
Locations of Divisaderan formations

Formation bold is type	Country	Basin	Notes
Divisadero Largo Formation	Argentina	Cuyo Basin	
Abanico Formation	Chile	Abanico Basin	
Andesitas Huancache Formation	Argentina	Golfo San Jorge Basin	
Chota Formation	Peru	Bagua Basin	
Guabirotuba Formation	Brazil	Curitiba Basin	
Leticia Formation	Argentina	Austral Basin	
Loreto Formation	Chile	Magallanes Basin	
Paracas Group	Peru	Pisco Basin	
Pozo Formation	Peru	Ucayali Basin	
Sarmiento Formation	Argentina	Golfo San Jorge Basin	
Soncco Formation	Peru	Eastern Peruvian Andes	
Yumaque Formation	Peru	Pisco Basin	

== Fossils ==
Group	Fossils	Formation	Notes
Mammals	Acamana ambiguus, Adiantoides leali, Allalmeia atalaensis, Brachystephanus postremus, Groeberia minoprioi, G. pattersoni, Phoradiadius divortiensis, Xenostephanus chiottii, Trigonostylops sp., ?Notoungulata indet.	Divisadero; Largo	
Mammals	Proeocoleophorus carlinii, Machlydotherium sp., Meteutatus sp., Nemolestes sp., Parutaetus sp., Utaetus sp., Argyrolagoidea indet., Astegotheriini indet., Astrapotheria indet., Euphractinae indet., Notopithecidae indet., Oldfieldthomasiidae indet., Palaeothentoidea indet.	Guabirotuba	
Mammals	Ocucajea picklingi, Supayacetus muizoni, Basilosauridae indet.	Paracas	
Mammals	Cachiyacuy contamanensis, C. kummeli, Canaanimys maquiensis, Eobranisamys javierpradoi, Eocoleophorus glyptodontoides, Pozomys ucayaliensis, Pseudostegotherium chubutanum, cf. Eoespina sp., cf. Griphodon sp., cf. Perulestes sp., Rumiodon sp., Sasawatsu sp., Stegosimpsonia sp., ?Trigonostylops sp., Wamradolops sp., Archaeohyracidae indet., Bonapartherioidea indet., Borhyaenidae indet., Chinchilloidea indet., Cingulata indet., Didelphimorphia indet., Interatheriinae indet., Litopterna indet., Microchiroptera indet., Molossidae indet., Phyllostomatidae indet., Polydolopimorphia indet., ?Sudamericidae indet., Toxodontia indet.	Pozo	
Mammals	Pseudocladosictis determinabile, Patene coluapiensis, Angelocabrerus daptes, Arminiheringia auceta, Caroloameghinia mater, C. tenuis, Coona gaudryi, Rosendolops primigenium, Polydolops crassus, P. serra, P. thomasi, Amphidolops serrula, Eudolops tetragonus, Pseudolops princeps, Progarzonia notostylopense, Ideodelphys microscopicus, Tonostylops spissus, Thomashuxleya rostrata, Coelostylodon caroloameghinoi, C. florentinoameghinoi, Acoelohyrax complicatissimus, Isotemnus colhuehuapiensis, I. primitivus, Anisotemnus distentus, Pleurostylodon crassiramis, P. modicus, P. similis, Homalostylops parvus, Notostylops bicinctus, N. murinus, Isostylops fretus, Catastylops deflexus, Eohyrax isotemnoides, E. praerusticus, Archaeopithecus fossulatus, A. rogeri, Maxschlosseria consumata, Oldfieldthomasia debilitata, O. parvidens, O. transversa, Ultrapithecus rutilans, Paginula parca, Transpithecus obtentus, Antepithecus brachystephanus, A. innexus, Notopithecus adapinus, Henricosbornia ?lophodonta, Acoelodus proclivus, Proectocion argentinus, P. precisus, Didolodus magnus, D. minor, D. multicuspis, Paulogervaisia inusta, P. mamma, P. porca, Ernestokokenia nitida, Albertogaudrya unica, ?Trigonostylops duplex, T. wortmani, Parutaetus chicoensis, P. clusus, P. signatus, Meteutatus percarinatus, Pseudostegotherium chubutanum, Prostegotherium astrifer, P. notostylopianum, Utaetus buccatus, U. deustus, U. lenis, Machlydotherium sparsum, Rutimeyeria conulifera Guilielmofloweria plicata, Anisolambda fissidens, Proplanodus adnepos, Periphragnis exauctus, Mazzoniphractus ingens	Sarmiento	
Mammals	Mystacodon selenensis	Yumaque	
Reptiles & amphibians	Cunampaia simplex, Ilchunaia parva, Barinasuchus sp.	Divisadero; Largo	
Reptiles & amphibians	?Balanerodus sp., cf. Sebecus sp., Anilioidea indet., Anura indet., Booidea indet., Caimaninae indet., ?Chelidae indet., Gavialoidea indet., Pipidae indet., ?Platynota indet.	Pozo	
Reptiles & amphibians	Eocaiman cavernensis, ?Boa sp., ?Madtsoia sp., Crocodylomorpha indet.	Sarmiento	
Birds	Spheniscidae indet.	Loreto	
Fishes	Ischyodus dolloi, Striatolamia macrota, Elasmobranchii indet.	Loreto	
Fishes	Potamotrygon ucayalensis, ?Colossoma sp., cf. Leporinus sp., cf. Hydrolycus sp., Actinopterygii indet., Characiformes indet.	Pozo	
Flora	Chara (Grambastichara) tornata, Nitellopsis (Tectochara) latispira	Pozo	
