= Guabirotuba Formation =

Geologic formation in Brazil

- Stratigraphic range: Late Mid Eocene (Divisaderan); ~42–38 Ma
- Type: Geological formation
- Underlies: alluvium
- Overlies: Cambrian basement
- Thickness: 60–80 m (200–260 ft)

Lithology
- Primary: Mudstone, sandstone
- Other: Conglomerate

Location
- Coordinates: 25.5°S 49.3°W
- Approximate paleocoordinates: 27.5°S 39.8°W
- Region: Paraná
- Country: Brazil
- Extent: Curitiba Basin

Type section
- Named for: Guabirotuba, Curitiba
- Named by: Salamuni & Bigarella
- Year defined: 1962
- Guabirotuba Formation (Brazil)

The Guabirotuba Formation is a late Middle Eocene (Divisaderan in the SALMA classification) geologic formation of the Curitiba Basin in Paraná, Brazil. The formation crops out in and around the city of Curitiba and comprises mudstones and sandstones deposited in a fluvial floodplain environment.

The 60 to 80 metres (200 to 260 ft) thick formation has provided several fossil mammals, and indeterminate side-neck turtle fossils, and indeterminate terror bird fossils. A newly described species of Cingulata; Proeocoleophorus carlinii was also found in the formation.

== Description ==
The Guabirotuba Formation was first described by Riad Salamuni and João José Bigarella in 1962. The geologists named the formation after Guabirotuba, a neighborhood of Curitiba, the capital of Paraná State. The formation is the lowermost sedimentary unit in the 3,000 square kilometres (1,200 sq mi) Curitiba Basin, a Cenozoic continental rift basin of southeastern Brazil, overlying Cambrian basement comprising gneisses, amphibolites and migmatites of the Atuba Complex and metasediments of the Açungui Group.

=== Lithologies ===
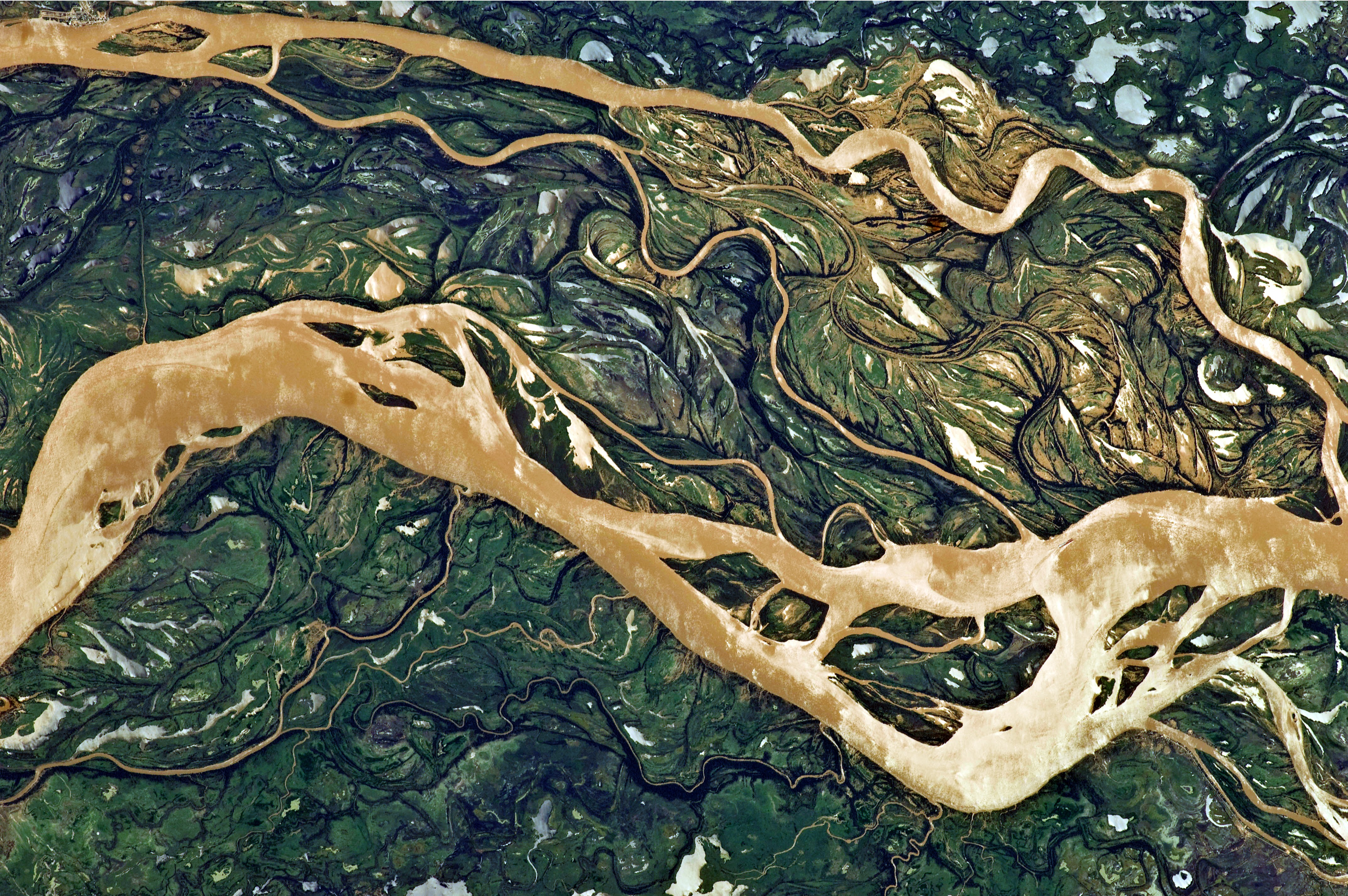
The depositional environment of the Guabirotuba Formation was a floodplain

The 60 to 80 metres (200 to 260 ft) thick Guabirotuba Formation comprises a basal conglomerate, mudstones and sandstones, deposited in a fluvial floodplain environment.

The sediments of the formation contain between 0.24 and 2.61% heavy minerals. Heavy mineral analysis on the very abundant zircons, abundant epidote, common tourmaline and kyanite and rare rutile has provided insight in the paleocurrents of the fluvial environment, with predominant flow directions towards the northwest and east-northeast.

=== Age ===
The age of the formation has been a matter of debate, with early descriptions assigning the formation to the Miocene to Pliocene, but after the discovery of a mammal fauna described by Sedor et al. in 2017, the age of the formation has been defined as late Middle Eocene, or "Barrancan", which is a sub-age of the Divisaderan South American land mammal age, (Note: The sub-ages "Barrancan" and "Vacan" are based on respectively the Gran Barranca Member and the Cañadón Vaca section of the Sarmiento Formation in Patagonia, Argentina and are not formally established; some authors consider the "Barrancan" as the upper age of the Casamayoran) ranging from approximately 42 to 39 Ma.

== Paleontological significance ==
The Guabirotuba Formation is one of few formations in Brazil providing Paleogene mammal faunas, between the older Tiupampan Maria Farinha Formation of the Parnaíba Basin and the Itaboraian Itaboraí Formation of the Itaboraí Basin in Rio de Janeiro State, and the younger Tinguirirican Entre-Córregos Formation of the Aiuruoca Basin and the Deseadan Tremembé Formation of the Taubaté Basin.

=== Fossil content ===
Fossils recovered from the formation include:

Class	Group	Fossils	Images	Notes
Mammals	Dasypodidae	Machlydotherium sp.		
Mammals	Dasypodidae	Meteutatus sp.		
Mammals	Dasypodidae	Parutaetus sp.		
Mammals	Dasypodidae	Utaetus sp.		
Mammals	Dasypodidae	Astegotheriini indet.		
Mammals	Dasypodidae	Parutaetus oliveira		
Mammals	Cingulata	Proeocoleophorus carlinii		
Mammals	Notoungulata	Oldfieldthomasiidae indet.		
Mammals	Notoungulata	Notopithecidae indet.		
Mammals	Astrapotheria	Astrapotheria indet.		
Mammals	Paucituberculata	Palaeothentoidea indet.		
Mammals	Sparassodonta	Nemolestes sp.		
Mammals	Theriiformes	Argyrolagoidea indet.		
Birds	Phorusrhacidae	Phorusrhacidae indet.		
Reptiles	Turtles	Pleurodira indet.		

== See also ==
- Abanico Formation, contemporaneous fossiliferous formation of Chile
- Macarao Formation, contemporaneous formation of Colombia
- Soncco Formation, contemporaneous fossiliferous formation of Peru

== Notes and references ==
=== References ===
==== Bibliography ====
- Bellosi, Eduardo S.; Krause, J. Marcelo (2014), "Onset of the Middle Eocene global cooling and expansion of open-vegetation habitats in central Patagonia" (PDF), Andean Geology, 41: 29–48
- Monteiro Machado, Denise Alessandra; Fernandes, Luiz Alberto; Góes, Ana Maria; de Mesquita, Maria José; Macedo de Lima, Fabio (2012), "Proveniência de sedimentos da Bacia de Curitiba por estudos de minerais pesados", Revista Brasileira de Geociências, 42 (3): 563–572, doi:10.25249/0375-7536.2012423563572 (inactive 12 July 2025), hdl:20.500.12733/23142
- Sedor, Fernando A.; Oliveira, Édison V.; Silva, David D.; Fernandes, Luiz A.; Cunha, Renata F.; Ribeiro, Ana M.; Dias, Eliseu V. (2017), "A New South American Paleogene Land Mammal Fauna, Guabirotuba Formation (Southern Brazil)" (PDF), Journal of Mammalian Evolution, 24: 39–55, doi:10.1007/s10914-016-9364-7
- Sedor, Fernando A.; Vieira Dias, Eliseu; Da Cunha, Renata Floriano; Alvarenga, Herculano (2014), Paleogene phorusrhacid bird (Aves, Phorusrhacidae) from the Guabirotuba Formation, Curitiba Basin, Paraná, South of Brazil, 4th International Palaeontological Congress, p. 807
- Da Silva Felipe, Rogério (2011), Características Geológico-Geotécnicas na Formação Guabirotuba Erosão - Movimentos Gravitacionais de Massa (PDF), MINEROPAR, pp. 1–48
- Wagner Rogério, Daniel; Vieira Dias, Eliseu; Sedor, Fernando Antonio; Weinschütz, Luiz Carlos; Del Mouro, Lucas; Leitão Waichel, Breno (2012), "Primeira ocorrência de Pleurodira (Testudines) para a Formação Guabirotuba, Bacia de Curitiba, Paraná, Brasil", Gaea: Journal of Geoscience, 8 (2): 42–46, Bibcode:2012Gaea....8...42R, doi:10.4013/gaea.2012.82.01
- Woodburne, M.O.; Goin, F.J.; Bond, M.; Carlini, A.A.; Gelfo, J.N.; López, G.M.; Iglesias, A.; Zimicz, A.N. (2013), "Paleogene Land Mammal Faunas of South America; a Response to Global Climatic Changes and Indigenous Floral Diversity", Journal of Mammalian Evolution, 21: 1–73, doi:10.1007/s10914-012-9222-1, hdl:11336/31253
