= Nanoastegotherium =

Nanoastegotherium Temporal range: Middle Miocene ~13–12 Ma

Scientific classification
- Kingdom: Animalia
- Phylum: Chordata
- Class: Mammalia
- Order: Cingulata
- Family: Dasypodidae
- Genus: †Nanoastegotherium; Carlini, Vizcaíno & Scillato-Yané, 1997
- Species: †N. prostatum

Binomial name
- †Nanoastegotherium prostatum Carlini, Vizcaíno & Scillato-Yané, 1997

Extinct genus of mammals

Nanoastegotherium is an extinct genus of cingulate, belonging to the family Dasypodidae, which includes the modern nine-banded armadillos. The name of the genus means "small Astegotherium", referring to its small size, smaller than the modern southern long-nosed armadillo, and to its affinities with Astegotherium, with which it forms the tribe Astegotheriini, within the family Dasypodidae. Its type species is Nanoastegotherium prostatum, whose species translates to "earlier" due to its age compared to Astegotherium.

Remains of this species comes from La Venta, a location of La Victoria Formation, from central Colombia, dated from the Middle Miocene. Its remains, discovered among the coprolites of crocodiles, consist of the osteoderms of its back and of a caudal tube. These osteoderms were characterized by their rectangular shape with large perforations on their surface, each osteoderms measuring between 4 and 7 millimeters long and 3 to 4.5 millimeters wide. Nanoastegotherium was apparently closely related with Pseudostegotherium.
