= Archaeopithecus =

Archaeopithecus Temporal range: Middle Eocene ~48.0–40 Ma

Scientific classification
- Kingdom: Animalia
- Phylum: Chordata
- Class: Mammalia
- Order: †Notoungulata
- Family: †Archaeopithecidae
- Genus: †Archaeopithecus; Ameghino, 1897

Type species
- †Archaeopithecus rogeri Ameghino, 1897

Synonyms
- Acropithecus tersus Ameghino 1904; Adpithecus plenus Ameghino 1902; Archaeopithecus alternans Ameghino 1902; Archaeopithecus rigidus Ameghino 1902; Notopithecus fossulatus Ameghino 1902

Extinct genus of notoungulates

Archaeopithecus is an extinct genus of notoungulate, belonging to the suborder Typotheria. It lived during the Middle Eocene, in what is today Argentina.

== Description ==
This animal is mostly known from several cranial remains, including an almost complete skull, teeth and mandibles. Comparison with some of its better known relatives suggests a small animal, somewhat similar to rodents, and weighing less than two kilograms. The snout was higher than in Notopithecus, with a longer rostrum; the mandible was short and thick, with a particularly massive, short and broad mandibular symphysis. The tympanic bullae were modestly sized.

Archaeopithecus had conical incisors, similar to its canines, and triangular-shaped upper premolars, devoid of hypocone. The premolars and molars had a strong parastyle and a paracone fold. Unlike other Eocene notoungulates such as Notopithecus and Oldfieldthomasia, which had low-crowned teeth, Archaeopithecus had a near-hypsodont (high-crowned) dentition, with short diastemas between the anterior teeth. The teeth of Archaeopithecus show an important occlusal variability during growth, associated with a variations caused by wear in the size of the teeth : with the progress of dental wear, the upper molars became wider, while the lower molars became broad and short.

== Classification ==
The type species, Archaeopithecus rongeri, was first described in 1897 by Florentino Ameghino. It is known from various fossils discovered in Middle Eocene terrains of Argentina. More recently, other species of small notoungulates from the same terrains were described, including Acropithecus tersus and Archaeopithecus rigidus. Several studies tried subsequently to shed light on their taxonomic confusion; a recent review of their fossil materials indicates that all those species are most probably synonymous with the type species.

Archaeopithecus and Acropithecus were initially described by Ameghino as primitive monkeys, hence their name, Archaeopithecus ("archaic monkey") and Acropithecus ("highest monkey"), but were later correctly attributed to the order Notoungulata. There is still doubts over the real relationships of this genus within Notoungulata; it is often placed, with its relative Teratopithecus, within the family Archaeopithecidae, sometimes including the better known genus Notopithecus, and characterized by the characteristic conical incisors and canines and the near hypsodont molars. It may have been an archaic member of the suborder Typotheria, a group of rodent-like notoungulates.
