= Punatherium =

Punatherium Temporal range: Late Eocene ~44–40 Ma

Scientific classification
- Domain: Eukaryota
- Kingdom: Animalia
- Phylum: Chordata
- Class: Mammalia
- Order: Cingulata
- Family: Dasypodidae
- Genus: †Punatherium; Ciancio et al, 2016

Type species
- †Punatherium catamarcensis Ciancio et al, 2016

Extinct genus of mammals

Punatherium is an extinct genus of xenarthran, belonging to the family Dasypodidae. It lived during the Late Eocene, and its fossilized remains were discovered in South America.

== Description ==
This animal, probably quite similar to modern armadillos, is only known from a few osteoderms. It was probably a medium sized armadillo, comparable to the big hairy armadillo in size. It is characterized by a pelvic region equipped with a rigid shield of osteoderms fused together, themselves endowed of a main figure anteriorly circumscribed by three large foramina. Other large foramina were present, located in the lateral and posterior margins. They formed four peripheral figures, all anteriorly disposed. The contact margins between the osteoderms had several low and blunt protuberances. The semi-mobile osteoderms, probably situated in the back and flanks, show a lageniform main figure, surrounded by six large perforations, except in the posterior area.

== Classification ==
Punatherium catamarcensis was first described in 2016, based on fossil remains found in Middle-Late Eocene terrains from the Catamarca Province of Argentina. Punatherium was a member of the family Dasypodidae, which includes the modern nine-banded armadillo.

== Bibliography ==
- Ciancio, M.R., Herrera, C., Aramayo, A., Payrola, P., and Babot, J. 2016. Diversity of cingulate xenarthrans in the middle–late Eocene of Northwestern Argentina. Acta Palaeontologica Polonica 61 (3): 575–590.
