= Dolichostylodon =

Dolichostylodon Temporal range: Middle Eocene ~42–40 Ma

Scientific classification
- Domain: Eukaryota
- Kingdom: Animalia
- Phylum: Chordata
- Class: Mammalia
- Order: †Notoungulata
- Family: †Oldfieldthomasiidae
- Genus: †Dolichostylodon; García López & Powell, 1952
- Species: †D. saltensis

Binomial name
- †Dolichostylodon saltensis García López & Powell, 1952

Extinct genus of mammals

Dolichostylodon is an extinct species of mammal, belonging to the order Notoungulata. It lived during the Middle Eocene, and its fossilized remains were discovered in South America.

== Description ==
About the size of a marmot, this animal was quite similar to other basal notoungulates such as Oldfieldthomasia, Ultrapithecus and Colbertia, from which it was mainly distinguished by the characteristics of its teeth. The deciduous premolars were more triangular-shaped than in Ultrapithecus, the paracone was more prominent, and the deciduous third lower premolar had a well-developed metaloph. The upper molars had a very prominent parastyle and metastyle. The metacone column was wider than in Colbertia, and the mesiolabial dimple was not present, while the distolabial dimple was wide and shallow.

== Classification ==
Dolichostylodon saltensis was first described in 2009, based on fossil remains found in the locality El Simbola, in the Salta Province of Argentina. It was a typical basal representative of the order Notoungulata, a large group of mammals that occupied during most of the Cenozoic various ecological niches in South America. Dolichostylodon was a member of the family Oldfieldthomasiidae, a possibly paraphyletic group comprising various small and basal notoungulates. Within Oldfieldthomasiidae, Dolichostylodon was closely related to the other Patagonian species, despite the low-crowned (brachydont) teeth.

== Bibliography ==
- D. A. García López and J. E. Powell. 2009. Un nuevo Oldfieldthomasiidae (Mammalia: Notoungulata) del Paleógeno de la provincia de Salta, Argentina. Ameghiniana 46(1):153-164
