= Cachiyacuy =

Cachiyacuy Temporal range: Middle Eocene (Divisaderan) ~41 Ma

Scientific classification
- Kingdom: Animalia
- Phylum: Chordata
- Class: Mammalia
- Order: Rodentia
- Parvorder: Caviomorpha
- Genus: †Cachiyacuy; Antoine et al. 2012

Species
- C. contamanensis Antoine et al. 2012 (type); C. kummeli Antoine et al. 2012

Extinct genus of rodents

Cachiyacuy is an extinct genus of caviomorph known from the Loreto of Peru. It contains two species: the type species C. contamanensis and C. kummeli.

== Description ==
All Cachiyacuy specimens were collected in the CTA-27 Locality (or Maquía locality), from the uppermost part of the Yahuarango Formation, dating to the latest Lutetian stage of the late Middle Eocene, about 41 million years ago. The type species C. contamanensis is known from the holotype MUSM 1871, a right second molar and from some referred teeth including MUSM 1870, MUSM 1872, MUSM 1873, MUSM 1874, MUSM 1875, MUSM 1876, MUSM 1877, MUSM 1878, MUSM 1879 and MUSM 1880. Its body mass estimated at 80–120 gram. The second species Cachiyacuy kummeli is known from the holotype MUSM 1882, a left first molar and from some referred teeth including MUSM 1881, MUSM 1883, MUSM 1885, MUSM 1886, MUSM 1887 and MUSM 1888. It was a tiny rodent, approximately 30% smaller than C. contamanensis as its body mass estimated at 30–40 gram. A cladistic analysis found Cachiyacuy to be monophyletic and one of the basalmost and the oldest known caviomorph (the other being Canaanimys from the same locality).

== Etymology ==
Cachiyacuy was first named by Pierre-Olivier Antoine, Laurent Marivaux, Darin A. Croft, Guillaume Billet, Morgan Ganerød, Carlos Jaramillo, Thomas Martin, Maëva J. Orliac, Julia Tejada, Ali J. Altamirano, Francis Duranthon, Grégory Fanjat, Sonia Rousse and Rodolfo Salas Gismondi in 2012 and the type species is Cachiyacuy contamanensis. The generic name is derived from Cachiyacu, name of a local River, and cuy, Quechua for "guinea pig". The specific name of the type species is named after the geographical provenance of the specimens, close to the city of Contamana. The specific name of C. kummeli honors the geologist Bernhard Kummel for describing extensively for the first time the Cachiyacu section in the 1940s.
