= Archaeopithecidae =

Archaeopithecidae Temporal range: Eocene (Riochican-Casamayoran) ~53–40 Ma

Scientific classification
- Kingdom: Animalia
- Phylum: Chordata
- Class: Mammalia
- Order: †Notoungulata
- Suborder: †Typotheria
- Family: †Archaeopithecidae; Ameghino 1897

Genera
- †Archaeopithecus; †Teratopithecus

Extinct family of mammals

Archaeopithecidae is an extinct family comprising two genera of notoungulate mammals, Teratopithecus and Archaeopithecus, both known from the Eocene of Argentina.
