= Cunampaia =

Cunampaia Temporal range: Late Eocene (Divisaderan-Tinguirirican) ~37.2–33.9 Ma

Scientific classification
- Kingdom: Animalia
- Phylum: Chordata
- Class: Reptilia
- Clade: Archosauria
- Clade: Pseudosuchia
- Clade: Crocodylomorpha
- Clade: Mesoeucrocodylia
- Genus: †Cunampaia; Rusconi, 1946

Type species
- C. simplex Rusconi, 1946

Extinct genus of reptiles

Cunampaia is a dubious genus of extinct mesoeucrocodylian. Fossils have been found from the Divisadero Largo Formation of Mendoza Province, Argentina, and date back to the Divisaderan to Tinguirirican regional South American Land Mammal Age of the Late Eocene epoch.

== Description ==
Originally it was regarded as a gruiform bird, being only recently reassigned as a crocodylomorph. In 1968 it was placed in its own family, Cunampaiidae, which falls within the suborder Cariamae. Despite this classification, it has frequently been referred to as a phorusrhacid.

Due to the lack of autapomorphies associated with the genus, Cunampaia is now considered to be a nomen dubium. As a result of this, its position is indeterminate within Mesoeucrocodylia.
