= Utaetus =

Utaetus Temporal range: Late Paleocene to Late Eocene (Selandian–Priabonian) 60–36 Ma

Scientific classification
- Kingdom: Animalia
- Phylum: Chordata
- Class: Mammalia
- Order: Cingulata
- Family: Dasypodidae
- Genus: †Utaetus; Ameghino 1902

Type species
- †Utaetus buccatus Ameghino 1902

Species
- U. buccatus Ameghino, 1902 (type); U. magnum Herrera et al., 2021; Dubious species: U. deustus Ameghino 1902; U. laevus Ameghino 1902; U. lenis Ameghino 1902

Synonyms
- Anteutatus Ameghino 1902; Orthutaetus Ameghino 1902; Posteutatus Ameghino 1902

Extinct species of armadillo

Utaetus is an extinct genus of mammal in the order Cingulata, related to the modern armadillos. The genus contains two species, Utaetus buccatus and U. magnum. It lived in the Late Paleocene to Late Eocene (about 60 to 36 million years ago) and its fossil remains were found in Argentina and Brazil in South America.

== Description ==
This animal, about 1 metre (3.3 ft) long, was very similar to a modern armadillo. In particular, the appearance likely recalled that of the modern Euphractus, and it already had the typical well-developed xenarthral joints on the vertebrae. Among the other characteristics in common with the modern armadillos, Utaetus possessed a bony connection between the ischium and the sacrum (this structure was constituted by caudal vertebrae known as pseudosacral) and continuous-growth cylindrical teeth similar to chisels, with wear in the occlusal part. There were ten lower teeth on each side of the jaw; the first two were much smaller and are interpreted as incisors. Unlike later armadillos, however, Utaetus still had a varying amount of enamel on the lingual and buccal surfaces of the teeth, and the cervical vertebrae were separated (and not co-ossified). The skeleton shows that this animal was adapted for digging, as evidenced by the presence of a large acromion on the scapula and a prominent olecranon on the ulna. The posterior margin of the scapula was thickened, and formed a secondary incipient spine.

== Classification ==
The genus Utaetus was first described in 1902 by Florentino Ameghino, based on fossil remains initially thought to date back to the Cretaceous. The type species is Utaetus buccatus, also known for cranial material, but Ameghino described further species based on fragmentary remains (U. deustus, U. lenis, U. laevus, U. laxus), now considered nomina dubia. Utaetus is considered a primitive member of the Dasypodidae, the family that includes the modern armadillos and their extinct relatives. In particular, Utaetus and its close relatives (such as Parutaetus) could be closely related to the modern genus Euphractus. The name Utaetus is an anagram of Eutatus, another extinct armadillo. In 2021, Claudia Herrera and colleagues named a new species of Utaetus based on several osteoderms that had been unearthed from the Middle Eocene strata of the Upper Lumbrera Formation in Salta Province, Argentina.

== Distribution ==
Fossils of Utaetus have been found in:

- Argentina
  - Geste Formation (Divisaderan)
  - Quebrada de los Colorados Formation (Casamayoran)
  - Sarmiento Formation (Casamayoran)
- Brazil
  - Guabirotuba Formation (Divisaderan)
