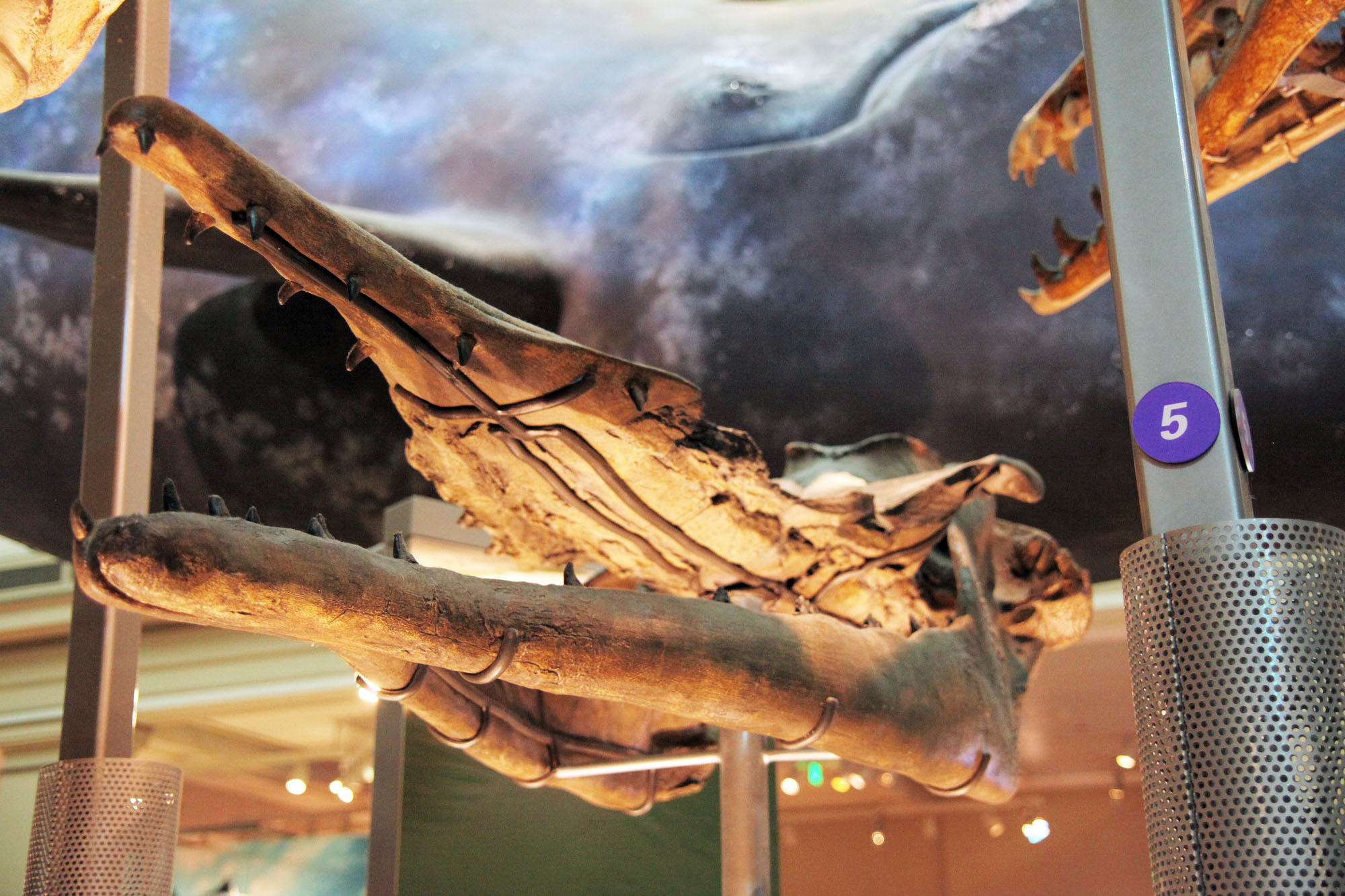
- Skull of Llanocetus at the Smithsonian Museum of Natural History

Scientific classification
- Kingdom: Animalia
- Phylum: Chordata
- Class: Mammalia
- Order: Artiodactyla
- Infraorder: Cetacea
- Parvorder: Mysticeti
- Family: †Llanocetidae; Mitchell, 1989

Genera
- †Llanocetus; †Mystacodon

= Llanocetidae =

Llanocetidae Temporal range: Late Eocene, Priabonian

Extinct family of whales

Llanocetidae is an extinct family of ancient toothed baleen whales from the Eocene. It was named by American paleontologist Edward Mitchell in 1989 after describing the Antarctic Llanocetus, but a 2018 study by paleontologists Ewan Fordyce and Felix Marx included the Peruvian Mystacodon and an undescribed New Zealand specimen OU GS10897.
