= Transpithecus =

Transpithecus Temporal range: Middle Eocene ~40–37 Ma

Scientific classification
- Kingdom: Animalia
- Phylum: Chordata
- Class: Mammalia
- Order: †Notoungulata
- Family: †Notopithecidae
- Genus: †Transpithecus; Ameghino, 1901
- Species: †T. obtentus

Binomial name
- †Transpithecus obtentus Ameghino, 1901

Synonyms
- Acoelodus connectus Ameghino 1901; Patriarchippus annectens Ameghino 1904

Extinct genus of mammals

Transpithecus is an extinct genus of notoungulates, belonging to the suborder Typotheria. It lived during the Middle Eocene in what is today South America.

== Description ==
This animal may have been vaguely similar to a marmot, and could reach approximately 50 centimeters in length. It shared several similarities with rodents, but wasn't closely related to them. Transpithecus was related to Notopithecus, but was differentiated from the latter genus by several characteristics of its teeth. Its upper molars were characterized by a quadrangular shape and an internal fold, separating a smaller anterior lobe from the posterior lobe, and had a small enamel relief in the middle of their crowns. The premolars and upper molars were devoid of mesial cingulum. There was also a small descending process on the maxilla, more or less at the height of the mesial margin of the second upper molar.

Transpithecus had its mandibular and maxillary deciduous molars replaced with permanent premolars in a direction from posterior to anterior, in contrast to most other notoungulates.

== Classification ==
Transpithecus obtentus was first described in 1901 by Florentino Ameghino, based on fossil remains found in Middle Eocene terrains from Argentina. Other fossils, initially described as different genera (Antepithecus, Acoelodus, Patriarchippus) were later attributed to the type species of Transpithecus.

Transpithecus is considered a member of Typotheria, a group of rodent-like notoungulate. Transpithecus was related to other basal typotheres, such as Notopithecus; these two genera, historically considered basal members of the family Interatheriidae, have recently been placed within their own clade, Notopithecidae, outside of that family.

== Bibliography ==
- F. Ameghino. 1901. Notices préliminaires sur des ongulés nouveaux des terrains crétacés de Patagonie [Preliminary notes on new ungulates from the Cretaceous terrains of Patagonia]. Boletin de la Academia Nacional de Ciencias de Córdoba 16:349-429
- G. G. Simpson. 1967. The beginning of the age of mammals in South America. Part II. Bulletin of the American Museum of Natural History 137:1-260
- B. Vera. 2012. Revisión del género Transpithecus Ameghino, 1901 (Notoungulata, Interatheriidae) del Eoceno medio de Patagonia, Argentina. Ameghiniana 49(1):60-74
- Vera B. 2013. Acoelodus connectus Ameghino, 1901, sinónimo de Transpithecus obtentus Ameghino, 1901, “Notopithecinae” del Eoceno de Patagonia. Ameghiniana. 50:535–540. Spanish.
- B. Vera. 2016. Phylogenetic revision of the South American notopithecines (Mammalia: Notoungulata). Journal of Systematic Palaeontology 14(6):461-480
