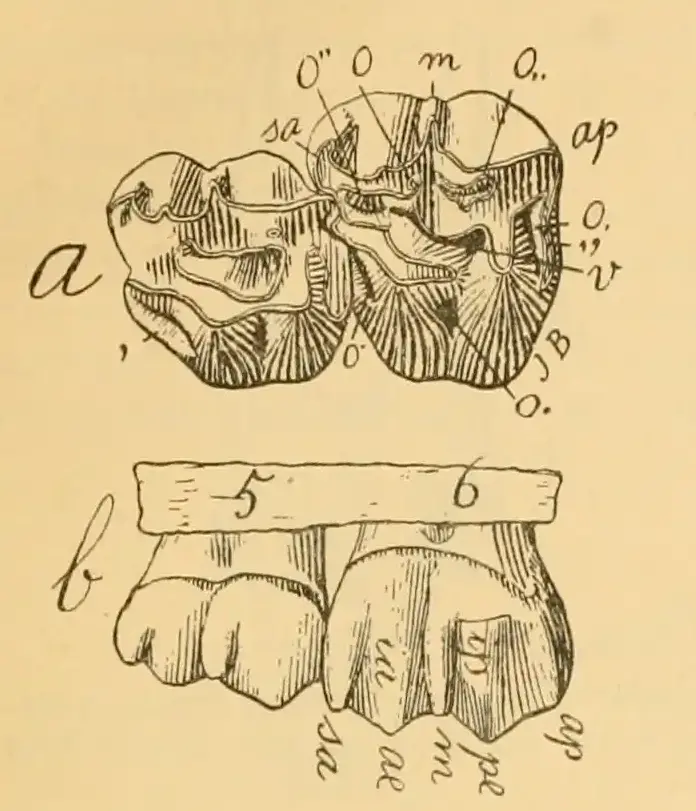
- An upper molar (tooth) of O. parvidens

Scientific classification
- Kingdom: Animalia
- Phylum: Chordata
- Class: Mammalia
- Order: †Notoungulata
- Family: †Oldfieldthomasiidae
- Genus: †Oldfieldthomasia; Ameghino, 1901

Species
- O. anfractuosa Ameghino 1901; O. debilitata Ameghino 1901; O. parvidens Ameghino 1901; O. transversa Ameghino 1901

Synonyms
- O. cingulata Ameghino 1901; O. conifera Ameghino 1901; O. cuneata Ameghino 1901; O. furcata Ameghino 1901; O. plicata Ameghino 1904

= Oldfieldthomasia =

Oldfieldthomasia Temporal range: Middle Eocene ~48–41 Ma

Extinct genus of mammals

Oldfieldthomasia is an extinct genus of notoungulate, probably related to the suborder Typotheria. It lived during the Middle Eocene, in what is today South America.

== Description ==
This animal was approximately the size of a marmot, and probably superficially resembled a rodent. The 10 centimeters long skull was rather low and had an elongated muzzle; the orbits, of large dimension, were posteriorly opened and located in the posterior area of the skull. The zygomatic apophysis was rather slender.

The posterior part of Oldfieldthomasia debilitata was closely studied by George Gaylord Simpson in 1936, through the realization of 55 very thin sections; the study highlighted numerous cranial characteristics, such as the relationships between the various cavities. The tympanic and hypotympanic cavities were not separated and were devoid of spongy tissue; the path of the pneumatic orifice can be followed between the epitympanic recess and the epitympanic sinus, filling free, and close to the size of tympanic cavity. The main sinuses of the veins and arteries were also visible : the carotid entered the tympanic cavity. As in all notoungulates, the cavity for the hyoid apophysis was quite large. The posterior jugular foramen and the median jugular foramen were notably external; the external portion of the first constituted the posterior carotid foramen.

The mandible was long and thin. The teeth formed a continuous and progressive series, with a complete series of 22 low-crowned (brachydont) teeth, both in the maxilla and the mandible. The canines were incisor-shaped. The protocone and the hypocone were almost identical, with an oblique and elongated central dimple and a posterior dimple stopped by a sort of hook fused to the ectoloph. An anterior and a posterior cingulum were present; the molars had a mesostyle, while the premolars were triangular, with a fold on the metacone.

== Classification ==
The genus Oldfieldthomasia was first described in 1901 by Florentino Ameghino, based on fossil remains found in terrains from the Middle Eocene of Argentina. Ameghino described several species, such as Oldfieldthomasia anfractuosa, O. debilitata, O. parvidens and O. traversa, but it may be possible that some of these forms represents intraspecific variations within a single species.

Oldfieldthomasia is the eponymous genus of the family Oldfieldthomasiidae, a group of archaic notoungulates representative of the Eocene; this family, however, is considered paraphyletic by some researchers. Oldfieldthomasia may have been part of an early evolutionary radiation of the suborder Typotheria, a group of notoungulates who occupied during the Cenozoic various ecological niches comparable to those of rodents in other continents. Its closes relatives were Allalmeia, Colbertia and Dolichostylodon.

== References and Bibliography ==
- F. Ameghino. 1901. Notices préliminaires sur des ongulés nouveaux des terrains crétacés de Patagonie [Preliminary notes on new ungulates from the Cretaceous terrains of Patagonia]. Boletin de la Academia Nacional de Ciencias de Córdoba 16:349-429
- F. Ameghino. 1904. Nuevas especies de mamíferos, cretáceos y terciarios de la República Argentina [New species of mammals, Cretaceous and Tertiarty, from the Argentine Republic]. Anales de la Sociedad Cientifica Argentina 56–58:1-142
- G. G. Simpson. 1936. Structure of a primitive notoungulate cranium. Am Mus Novit;824:1–32.
- G. G. Simpson. 1967. The beginning of the age of mammals in South America. Part II. Bulletin of the American Museum of Natural History 137:1-260
