= Silvenator =

Silvenator Temporal range: Early Eocene

Scientific classification
- Kingdom: Animalia
- Phylum: Chordata
- Class: Mammalia
- Order: †Sparassodonta
- Genus: †Silvenator
- Species: †S. brasiliensis

Binomial name
- †Silvenator brasiliensis Rangel et al., 2023

Extinct genus of sparassodont

Silvenator is an extinct monotypic genus of sparassodont that lived in Brazil during the Ypresian stage of the epoch.

== Taxonomy ==
Originally assigned to the genus Nemolestes, Silvatherium brasiliensis was reclassified as belonging to its own genus in 2023.
