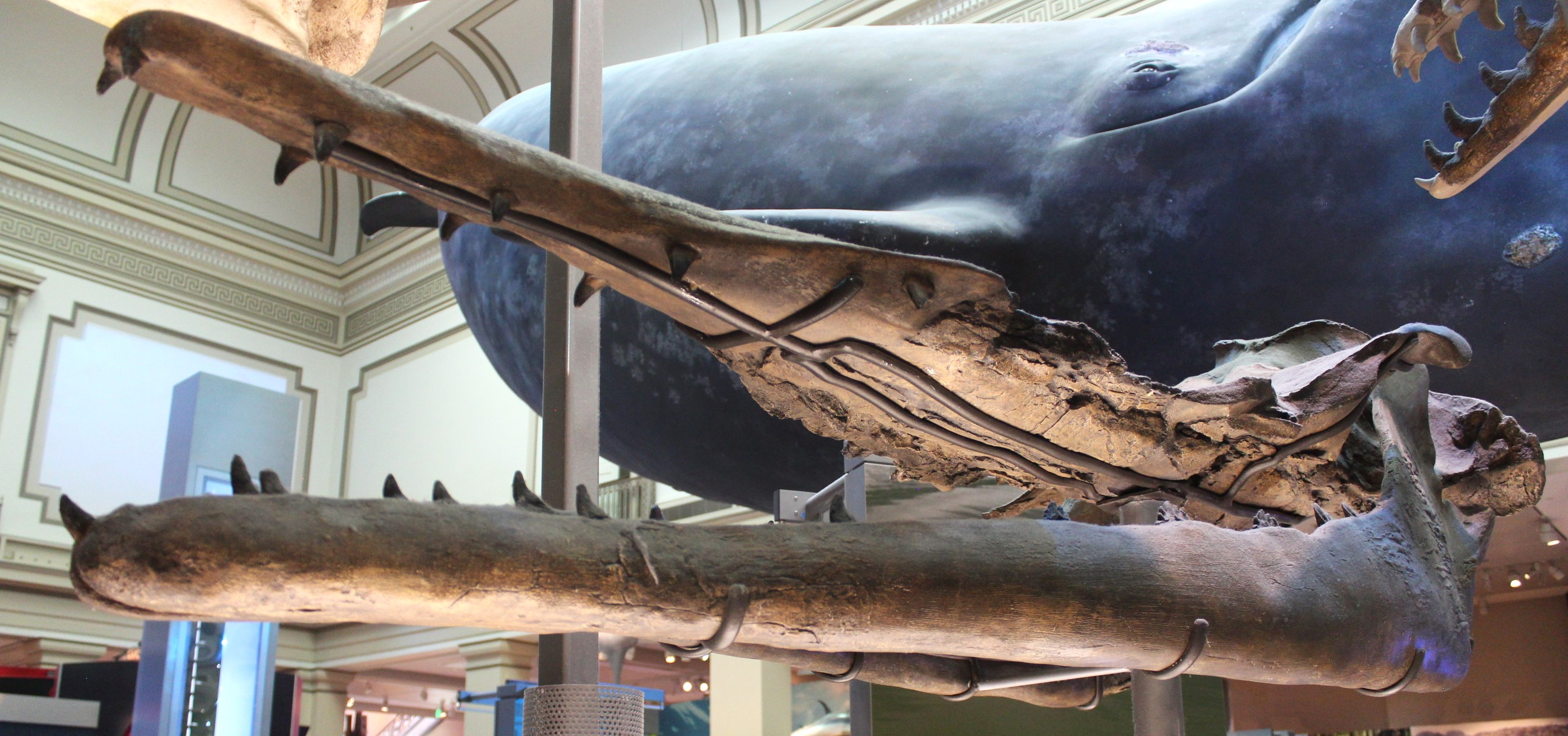
- Skull of Llanocetus denticrenatus at the Smithsonian Museum of Natural History

Scientific classification
- Kingdom: Animalia
- Phylum: Chordata
- Class: Mammalia
- Order: Artiodactyla
- Infraorder: Cetacea
- Parvorder: Mysticeti
- Family: †Llanocetidae
- Genus: †Llanocetus; Mitchell, 1989

Type species
- †Llanocetus denticrenatus Mitchell, 1989

= Llanocetus =

Llanocetus Temporal range: Priabonian

Genus of extinct toothed baleen whales

Llanocetus ( "Llano's whale" ) is a genus of extinct toothed baleen whales from the Late Eocene of Antarctica and New Zealand. The type species, Llanocetus denticrenatus, reached gigantic proportions, with the juvenile specimen reaching an estimated 8 m (26 ft) in length; a second, unnamed species, known only from three isolated premolar teeth, reached an estimated total body length of up to 12 m (39 ft). Like other contemporary baleen whales of the Eocene, Llanocetus completely lacked baleen in its jaws. It was probably a suction feeder like the modern beaked and pygmy right whales.

== History ==
Llanocetus was described in 1989 by paleontologist Edward Mitchell based on a partial mandible with two teeth, specimen USNM 183022, and an endocast of the braincase, referred to the same specimen, from the La Meseta Formation of Seymour Island, Antarctica. They were excavated in 1974–75 by a joint team from the Instituto Antártico Argentino, Ohio State University and Northern Illinois University. The complete skull belonging to the holotype specimen was described in 2018 by paleontologists Robert Ewan Fordyce and Felix Marx. It was excavated in the 1980s, with the assistance of Fordyce, and shipped to New Zealand for preparation and study. In 2026 the skull was transferred to the Smithsonian, reuniting the holotype material. Though Mitchell, based on the size and density of the bone, thought the specimen was an adult, Fordyce and Marx concluded it was a juvenile due to the loss of both epiphyses—which are the surfaces that the vertebra connects to the other vertebrae to—on the single preserved neck vertebra.

Dating to the Late Eocene, it is the second-oldest-known baleen whale, behind Mystacodon. However, Mitchell classified it into the new infraorder Crenaticeti as an intermediary between Archaeoceti—the forerunners of modern whale types—and more modern baleen whales, but Crenaticeti was later invalidated in 2016. Phylogenetic analysis grouped Llanocetus into the Eocene family Llanocetidae along with Mystacodon and an as yet undescribed specimen OU GS10897 from New Zealand.

The genus name is in honor of the American biologist George A. Llano who helped Mitchell gain access to the specimen. The species name derives from Latin denti, teeth, and crena, notch, in reference to the tooth shape which is similar to the crabeater seal.

== Description ==
Llanocetus had several ancient characteristics reminiscent of archaeocetes. The dental formula, 3.1.4.23.1.4.3, indicating number of, in order, incisors, canines, premolars, and molars in one half of a jaw, is similar to basilosaurid archaeocetes. However, the broad snout is unlike archaeocetes. Wearing patterns on the cheek teeth, the molars and premolars, indicate they sheared passed each other while biting, which would have given Llanocetus the ability to slice through flesh, and serration wearing indicates a gripping function. It had wide gaps (diastema) between the teeth. Its teeth had one of the thickest enamel layers of any known baleen whale, 830–890 μm at the top and 350–380 μm at the base, which is also consistent with a shearing action. It had a crest on the mandible which may have supported proper musculature to pucker its lips.

All baleen whales have in their mouth palatal sulci, which carry blood, between tooth sockets, which has generally thought to be indicative of baleen. However, in Llanocetus, these sulci are present within the tooth sockets, meaning sulci are not always indicative of baleen, and the whale probably did not have baleen. Palatal sulci are generally associated with large gums, and this enhanced blood supply in these early whales may have eventually led to the secondary evolution of baleen in later whales.

The estimated minimum length for this juvenile specimen is 8 m (26 ft), comparable to a modern-day adult minke whale, and exceeding the size of most whales until the Late Miocene. For most of the Oligocene and Miocene, whales generally stayed well below 6 m (20 ft) in length. Large size in baleen whales was thought to be linked to the evolution of baleen and bulk feeding behavior; however, Llanocetus is evidence that gigantism evolved multiple times in baleen whales. The size of Llanocetus is probably due to its polar environment or potential long-distance traveling.

== Paleobiology ==
Llanocetus, when it was first described, was thought to have been a filter feeder with a similar mechanism to the modern crabeater seal, based on the notched teeth which Mitchell thought fit together to strain food out of the water. However, it is now thought to have been a suction feeder, and similar facial structures are seen in the modern-day suction-feeding beaked whales and the pygmy right whale. It may have used a combination of suction feeding and raptorial behavior—whereby it used its teeth to hunt prey.

== Paleoecology ==
The La Meseta Formation represents the Eocene, which spans 48 to 34 million years ago (mya). The area probably was a cool-water environment, unlike modern Antarctica, with the still-forming Humboldt Current cycling cold, nutrient-rich water. The specimen was found in what probably was a river delta in a lagoon, protected from waves by shoals. The formation displays a diverse elasmobranch (sharks and rays) assemblage, the most common found being angelsharks, Pristiophorus sawsharks, and sand sharks, mainly cool-water fauna, though some warm-water immigrants were found, such as the zebra shark. Bony fish are not as common. The leatherback sea turtle Psephophorus was found. The most common seabirds were giant penguins.. While originally thought to have been restricted to the Antarctic circle, fragmentary remains from Chatham Island, New Zealand suggests a greater geographic distribution for this taxa.
