= Sierra Baguales =

Mountain range in Chile

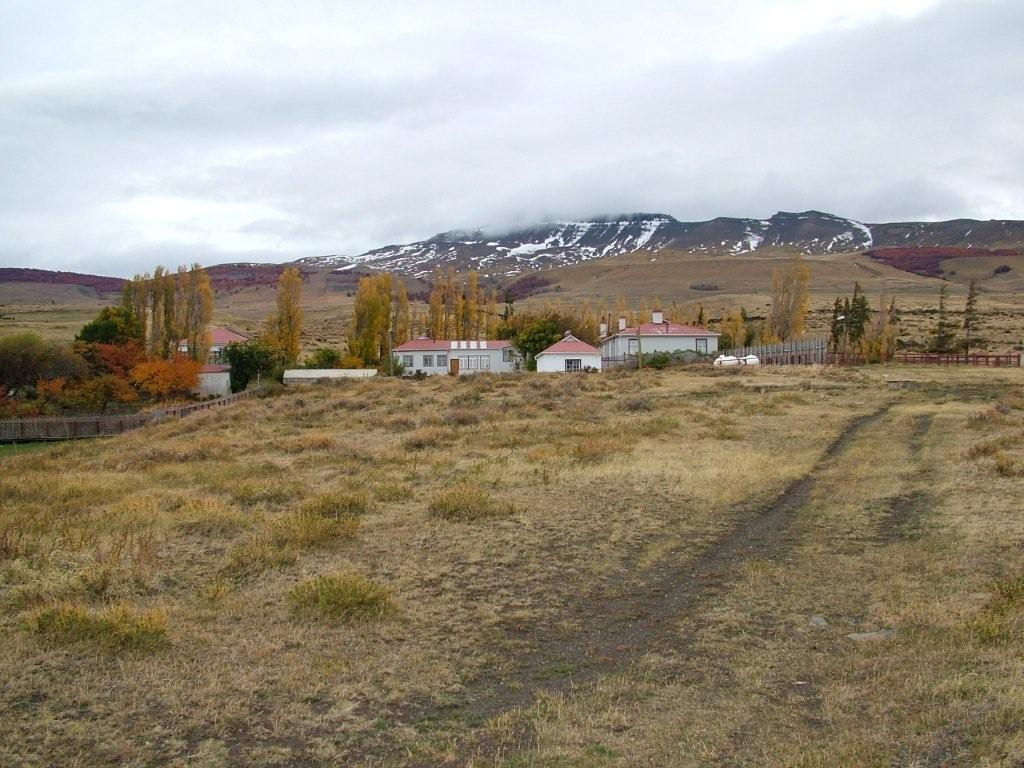
- View to north of Cerro Guido and Estancia Cerro Guido

Highest point
- Peak: Cerro Ciudadela
- Elevation: 2,084 m (6,837 ft)

Dimensions
- Length: 60 km (37 mi) east-west

Geography
- Location within Argentina
- Countries: Argentina; Chile
- Region(s): Santa Cruz Province; Magallanes
- Range coordinates: 50°44′S 72°24′W
- Parent range: Andes

Geology
- Rock age: Late Eocene-Early Miocene
- Rock type(s): sedimentary rock igneous sills

Sierra Baguales or Sierra de los Baguales is a mountain range in the southernmost Andes. Sierra Baguales is a 60 kilometres (37 mi) long east–west chain, secondary to the main chain of the Andes that lie further west. It lies along the border between Chile and Argentina near the localities of Puerto Natales and Río Turbio.

== Geology ==
The mountain range contains a series of cirques formed by glaciers. Many cirques developed in the Pleistocene Epoch from isolated glaciers that existed separedly from ice sheets further west. The rocks of Sierra Baguales belong to various formations of Magallanes Basin. These rocks contain fossils of plants, mammals and marine invertebrates.

=== Stratigraphy ===
From top to bottom the following formations make up Sierra Baguales:

- Santa Cruz Formation, sedimentary rocks belonging to a non-marine succession and hosting many vertebrate fossils
- Estancia 25 de Mayo Formation, a succession of fossil-bearing sedimentary rocks that date to the Early Miocene. Sediments were deposited in a marine environment.
- La Cumbre Formation, an olivine-bearing gabbro sill
- Río Leona Formation, a succession of non-marine fossils, some of which contain Nothofagus fossils
- Bandurrías Formation, an olivine-bearing gabbro sill
- Loreto Formation, sedimentary rocks variously assigned a Late Eocene to Early Miocene age. Contains fossil shark teeth.

On the eastern slopes of Sierra Baguales various lithic artifacts have been found. Human occupation of eastern foothills begun no later than 4,500 years before present.
