= Astegotherium =

Astegotherium Temporal range: Early-Late Eocene ~50–42 Ma

Scientific classification
- Kingdom: Animalia
- Phylum: Chordata
- Class: Mammalia
- Order: Cingulata
- Family: Dasypodidae
- Tribe: †Astegotheriini
- Genus: †Astegotherium; Ameghino, 1902

Type species
- †Astegotherium dichotomus Ameghino, 1902

Extinct genus of mammals

Astegotherium is an extinct genus of xenarthran, belonging to the family Dasypodidae. It lived from the Early to the Middle Eocene, and its fossilized remains are found in Argentina.

== Description ==
This genus is only known from the dermal plates (osteoderms) that composed its dorsal armor. It was probably fairly similar with the modern nine-banded armadillo. Astegotherium was characterized by its osteoderms with a central figure almost devoid of foramina, while the posterior part of the osteoderms has hair foramina.

== Classification ==
The type species, Astegotherium dichotomus, was first described in 1902 by Florentino Ameghino, based on fossil remains found in Argentina, dating to the Middle Eocene. Other fossils attributed to this genus were later discovered in Argentina, in terrains dating from the Early to the Middle-Late Eocene.

Astegotherium is one of the earliest armadillo known in the fossil records, and it is considered a member of the family Dasypodidae, which includes the modern nine-banded armadillo.

== Bibliography ==
- Tejedor, M.F., Goin, F.J., Gelfo, J.N., López, G.M., Bond, M., Carlini, A.A, Scillato-Yané, G.J., Woodburne, M.O., Chornogubsky, L., Aragón, E., Reguero, M.A., Czaplewski, N.J., Vincon, S., Martin, G.M., and Ciancio, M. 2009. New early Eocene mammalian fauna from Western Patagonia, Argentina. American Museum Novitates 3638: 1–43.
- Ciancio, M.R., Herrera, C., Aramayo, A., Payrola, P., and Babot, J. 2016. Diversity of cingulate xenarthrans in the middle–late Eocene of Northwestern Argentina. Acta Palaeontologica Polonica 61 (3): 575–590.
