= Teratopithecus =

Teratopithecus Temporal range: Middle Eocene (Mustersan) ~48.0–40 Ma

Scientific classification
- Domain: Eukaryota
- Kingdom: Animalia
- Phylum: Chordata
- Class: Mammalia
- Order: †Notoungulata
- Family: †Archaeopithecidae
- Genus: †Teratopithecus; López et al., 2020
- Species: †T. elpidophoros

Binomial name
- †Teratopithecus elpidophoros López et al., 2020

Extinct genus of notoungulates

Teratopithecus is an extinct genus of archaeopithecid notoungulate that lived during the Middle Eocene of what is now Argentina. Fossils of this genus have been found in the Sarmiento Formation of Argentina.

== Description ==
This animal was similar to a medium-sized rodent, with a rather massive, short and compact skull. It shared several similarities with its better known relative Archaeopithecus, such as nearly high-crowned (hypsodont) premolars and molars, contrary to most of the other Early Eocene notoungulates. A characteristic anatomical feature of Teratopithecus is the existence of a stylar cusp in labial position compared to the molar ectoloph, a unique condition within Notounugulata. This most likely indicates a particular specialization in nutrition.

== Classification ==
Teratopithecus elpidophoros, the only known species from the genus, was first described in 2020, based on fossil remains discovered near the localities Paso del Sapo, Las Violetas and Cañadón Vaca in central Patagonia.

Teratopithecus was an archaic member of the suborder Typotheria, a clade of notoungulates similar to modern hyraxes or rodents. Teratopithecus was related to Archaeopithecus, a slightly younger genus, both being the only known members of the family Archaeopithecidae, characterized by their high-crowned molars.
