= Canaanimys =

Canaanimys Temporal range: Mid Eocene (Divisaderan) ~41 Ma

Scientific classification
- Kingdom: Animalia
- Phylum: Chordata
- Class: Mammalia
- Infraclass: Placentalia
- Order: Rodentia
- Genus: †Canaanimys; Antoine et al. 2012
- Species: †C. maquiensis

Binomial name
- †Canaanimys maquiensis Antoine et al. 2012

Extinct genus of rodents

Canaanimys is an extinct genus of caviomorph known from the Loreto of Peru.

== Description ==
Canaanimys is known from the holotype MUSM 1890, a right second molar and from some referred teeth including MUSM 1889, MUSM 1891, MUSM 1892, MUSM 1893, MUSM 1894 and MUSM 1895. It was collected in the CTA-27 Locality (or Maquía locality), from the uppermost part of the Yahuarango Formation, dating to the latest Lutetian stage of the late Middle Eocene, about 41 million years ago. It was a tiny rodent as its body mass estimated at approx. 40 g. A cladistic analysis found it to be the basalmost known caviomorph, and one of the oldest (the other being Cachiyacuy from the same locality).

== Etymology ==
Canaanimys was first named by Pierre-Olivier Antoine, Laurent Marivaux, Darin A. Croft, Guillaume Billet, Morgan Ganerød, Carlos Jaramillo, Thomas Martin, Maëva J. Orliac, Julia Tejada, Ali J. Altamirano, Francis Duranthon, Grégory Fanjat, Sonia Rousse and Rodolfo Salas Gismondi in 2012 and the type species is Canaanimys maquiensis. The generic name is derived from Canaan, name of a local Shipibo native community, and mys, Greek for "mouse". The specific name is named after its place of discovery.
