= Loreto Formation =

Geologic formation in Chile

- Stratigraphic range: Priabonian (Divisaderan)
- Type: Geological formation
- Underlies: not observed
- Overlies: Leña Dura Formation

Lithology
- Primary: Sandstone
- Other: Conglomerate, coal

Location
- Coordinates: 53.1°S 71.1°W
- Approximate paleocoordinates: 55.3°S 61.4°W
- Region: Magallanes y la Antártica Chilena Region
- Country: Chile
- Extent: Magallanes Basin

Type section
- Named by: Hoffstetter et al.
- Year defined: 1957
- Loreto Formation (Chile)

Loreto Formation (Spanish: Formación Loreto) is a sedimentary formation of Late Eocene age in the southernmost Magallanes Basin. It overlies the Leña Dura Formation and the contact with an overlying formation is not observed. From 2013 to 2020 its coals were mined in Invierno mine, Riesco Island.

== Description ==
The formation contains fossil wood, leaf imprints and palynomorphs. Also fossil fish of Striatolamia macrota and Ischyodus dolloi and indeterminate Spheniscidae fossils have been found in the formation.

The formation crops out in Brunswick Peninsula and Sierra Baguales among other places.
