= Mystacodon =

Mystacodon Temporal range: Priabonian (Divisaderan) ~36.4 Ma

Scientific classification
- Kingdom: Animalia
- Phylum: Chordata
- Class: Mammalia
- Order: Artiodactyla
- Infraorder: Cetacea
- Family: †Llanocetidae
- Genus: †Mystacodon; Lambert et al. 2017
- Species: †M. selenensis

Binomial name
- †Mystacodon selenensis Lambert et al. 2017

Extinct genus of mammals

Mystacodon is a genus of toothed baleen whale from the Late Eocene Yumaque Member of Paracas Formation (previously called as Yumaque Formation) of the Pisco Basin in southwestern Peru. It is the oldest known baleen whale, and was probably a suction feeder of small prey on the seafloor.

== Taxonomy ==
Mystacodon is the oldest known baleen whale, the holotype specimen dating to 36.4 million year ago to the Priabonian of the latest Eocene. The holotype, MUSM 1917, comprises the braincase, teeth, the spinal cord excluding the sacral vertebrae, some fin bones, and the left hip bone. It was originally classified into its own family, Mystacodontidae, but it was moved to the family Llanocetidae in 2018 alongside Llanocetus–the second-oldest baleen whale–and an undescribed New Zealand specimen OU GS10897.

The genus name, Mystacodon is said to be derived from ancient Greek mystacos "moustache" and odontos "tooth". The proper words in ancient Greek for "moustache" and "tooth" are however μύσταξ (mystax) and ὀδούς (odous). The use of the ancient Greek word for "moustache" is a reference to the taxon Mysticeti, the baleen whales, The species name, selenensis comes from Selene, the Greek goddess of the moon, in reference to the locality of the Yumaque Formation it was found in, Playa Media Luna–"Half Moon Beach".

== Description ==
Mystacodon probably measured around 3.75 or 4 m (12.3 or 13.1 ft) in length, which is larger than nearly all Oligocene toothed baleen whales. Compared to the more ancient archaeocete whales, the snout is much more flattened, and the nostrils are much further up the snout. This flattening shows reduced function of the incisor teeth and grasping capabilities, and the increased length of the head allowed a greater mouth volume. It is uncertain if the whale had any baleen in its mouth, and, unlike archaeocetes, it lacks a sagittal crest, indicating a reduction of the temporalis muscle which is used in biting. The eye sockets are proportionally larger, are oriented further forward, and are slightly more elevated. The premolars and molars have two roots.

The humerus in the arm is about as long as the shoulder blade and much longer than the radius and ulna in the forearm, a condition seen in modern slow-moving whales. The muscles were probably flexed constantly, a condition not seen in any other whale species, perhaps to aid in moving along the seafloor or maintaining a position in the water. The hip is more similar to basilosaurid archaeocetes, with a short ilium and a defined hip joint.

== Paleobiology ==
Mystacodon was likely a suction feeder, a transitional stage of baleen whale evolution between the predatory hunting of archaeocetes and the filter feeding of more modern baleen whales. Glossowear, a form of dental wear caused by suction feeding, on the teeth of Mystacodon supports this interpretation. The whale may have been a bottom feeder and targeted small prey. A Myliobatis eagle ray stinger and clupeiform forage fish scales–a group that includes herring, sardines, and anchovies–were found around the holotype. Myliobatis may have been a potential prey item.
