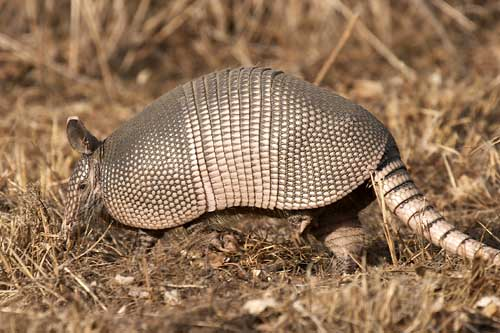
- Dasypus novemcinctus

Scientific classification
- Kingdom: Animalia
- Phylum: Chordata
- Class: Mammalia
- Order: Cingulata; Gray, 1821
- Family: Dasypodidae; Gray, 1821

Type genus
- Dasypus Linnaeus, 1758

Genera
- See text.
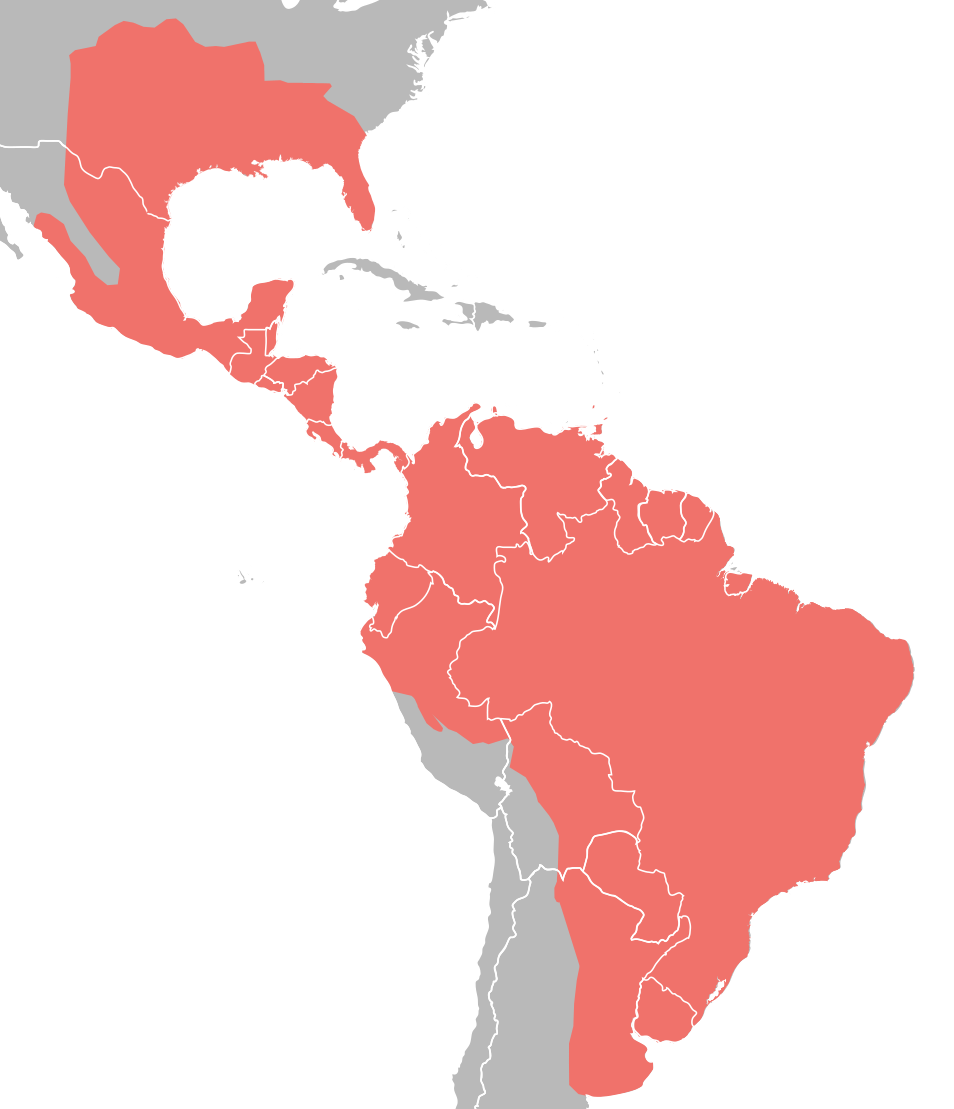
- Dasypodidae distribution

= Dasypodidae =

Dasypodidae Temporal range: Early Eocene to present

Family of armadillos

Dasypodidae is a family of mostly extinct genera of armadillos. One genus, Dasypus, is extant, with eight living species.

== Classification ==
Below is a taxonomy of armadillos in this family.

- Family Dasypodidae
  - † Genus Acantharodeia
  - † Genus Amblytatus
  - † Genus Archaeutatus
  - † Genus Barrancatatus
  - † Genus Chasicotatus
  - † Genus Chorobates
  - † Genus Coelutaetus
  - † Genus Eocoleophorus
  - † Genus Epipeltecoelus
  - † Genus Eutatus
  - † Genus Hemiutaetus
  - † Genus Isutaetus
  - † Genus Lumbreratherium
  - † Genus Macrochorobates
  - † Genus Mazzoniphractus
  - † Genus Meteutatus
  - † Genus Pedrolypeutes
  - † Genus Prodasypus
  - † Genus Proeutatus
  - † Genus Prostegotherium
  - † Genus Pucatherium
  - † Genus Punatherium
  - † Genus Stegotherium
  - † Genus Stenotatus
  - † Genus Utaetus
  - Subfamily Dasypodinae
    - † Tribe Astegotheriini
      - † Genus Nanoastegotherium
      - † Genus Parastegosimpsonia
      - † Genus Riostegotherium
      - † Genus Astegotherium
      - † Genus Stegosimpsonia
    - Tribe Dasypodini
      - † Genus Anadasypus
      - Genus Dasypus
      - † Genus Nabondasypus
      - † Genus Pliodasypus
      - † Genus Propraopus

== Phylogeny ==
Dasypodidae forms the sister clade to Chlamyphoridae within Cingulata, as shown in the cladogram of extant dasypodids (Dasypus) below. The greater long-nosed armadillo (D. kappleri) is basal within this genus.

Cladogram of Cingulata

- Cingulata
  - Dasypodidae
    - Dasypus
      - D. (Hyperoambon)
        - D. kappleri
      - D. (Dasypus)
        - - D. septemcinctus
          - D. hybridus
        - - - D. yepesi
            - D. sabanicola
          - - D. novemcinctus
            - D. pilosus
  - Chlamyphoridae
    - Euphractinae
    - - †Glyptodontinae
      - - Chlamyphorinae
        - Tolypeutinae
