= Allalmeia =

Allalmeia Temporal range: Late Eocene (Divisaderan-Tinguirirican) ~37.2–33.9 Ma
- Right second upper molar

Scientific classification
- Kingdom: Animalia
- Phylum: Chordata
- Class: Mammalia
- Order: †Notoungulata
- Family: †Oldfieldthomasiidae
- Genus: †Allalmeia; Rusconi, 1946
- Species: †A. atalaensis

Binomial name
- †Allalmeia atalaensis Rusconi, 1946

Extinct genus of notoungulates

Allalmeia was a small notoungulate mammal of around 3 kilograms. It lived in Mendoza Province, Argentina (Divisadero Largo Formation) during the Late Eocene. Allalmeia belonged to the Oldfieldthomasiidae family within the suborder Typotheria.

== Description ==
It was a small digitigrade mammal, with brachyodont and lophobunodont teeth, teeth that have a combination of ridges (lophodont dentition) and cones (bunodont dentition). It had a generalized way of locomotion, that means, it could move easily in any terrain, but probably it preferred the safety of the forest trees where it lived. Although being an ungulate, Allalmeia had claws as the oldest mammals.
