= Stegosimpsonia =

Stegosimpsonia Temporal range: 56.0–37.2 Ma

Scientific classification
- Kingdom: Animalia
- Phylum: Chordata
- Class: Mammalia
- Order: Cingulata
- Family: Dasypodidae
- Tribe: †Astegotheriini
- Genus: †Stegosimpsonia; Vizcaino, 1994

Extinct genus of armadillos

Stegosimpsonia is an extinct genus of armadillo in the family Dasypodidae from the Eocene epoch.
