= Colbertia =

Colbertia Temporal range: Early Eocene-Middle Eocene (Itaboraian-Mustersan) ~52–45 Ma

Scientific classification
- Kingdom: Animalia
- Phylum: Chordata
- Class: Mammalia
- Order: †Notoungulata
- Family: †Oldfieldthomasiidae
- Genus: †Colbertia; Paula Couto 1952

Type species
- †Colbertia magellanica Price & Paula Couto 1901

Species
- C. falui Fernández et al 2021; C. lumbrerense Bond 1981; C. magellanica Price & Paula Couto 1901

Extinct genus of mammals

Colbertia is an extinct genus of oldfieldthomasiid notoungulate. It lived from the Early to the Middle Eocene, and its fossilized remains were discovered in Argentina and Brazil.

== Description ==
This animal was roughly the size of a Virginia opossum, reaching approximately 50 centimeters in length excluding its tail. Its weight has been estimated to have been around 2 to 3 kilograms.

Colbertia had a relatively elongated skull, with low-crowned (brachydont) molars; the cusps of the molars were joined to form ridge-like structures called lophs, and are therefore considered lophodont. The paracone and the metacone had notable folds. The ankle bones of Colbertia indicates that it was a plantigrade, an ancestral condition within Notoungulata. The bone morphology at the base of the skull was very similar to other basal Notoungulates, although the petrous bone had distinct characteristics also found in similar but slightly more recent notoungulates, such as Dolichostylodon.

== Classification ==
The genus Colbertia was first described in 1952 by Carlos de Paula Couto, as a new genus for a species of notoungulate described two years earlier and attributed to the genus Oldfieldthomasia as O. magellanica. The type species of the genus is Colbertia magellanica, from the Early Eocene Itaboraí Formation of Brazil. Fossils attributed to other species, C. lumbrerense and C. falui, have been discovered in Argentina in slightly younger deposits, from the Middle Eocene.

Colbertia is a basal member of the suborder Typotheria, a group of notoungulates sharing similarities with hyraxes and rodents. Colbertia was a basal member of this clade, within the family Oldfieldthomasiidae, which may be paraphyletic. Colbertia may have been close to the most basal typothere, who subsequently derived and diversified considerably to occupy a variety of ecological niches.

== Paleoecology ==
Colbertia was a terrestrial, herbivorous mammal, with a diet composed of tender leaves, buds and flowers.

== Bibliography ==
- C. d. Paula Couto. 1952. Fossil mammals from the beginning of the Cenozoic in Brazil. Notoungulata. American Museum Novitates 1568:1-16
- M. Bond. 1981. Un nuevo Oldfieldthomasiidae (Mammalia, Notoungulata) del Eoceno inferior (Fm. Lumbrera, Grupo Salta) del NW Argentino. II Congresso Latino-Americano de Paleontología 2:521-536
- D. A. García López. 2011. Basicranial Osteology of Colbertia lumbrerense Bond, 1981 (Mammalia: Notoungulata). Ameghiniana 48(1):3-12
- Fernández, M.; Zimicz, A. N.; Bond, M.; Chornogubsky, L.; Arnal, M.; Cárdenas, M.; Fernicola, J. C. (2021). "New Eocene South American native ungulates from the Quebrada de los Colorados Formation at Los Cardones National Park, Argentina". Acta Palaeontologica Polonica. 66 (1): 85–97. doi:10.4202/app.00784.2020.
