= Carlos de Paula Couto =

Brazilian paleontologist

- Born: August 30, 1910; Porto Alegre
- Died: 15 November 1982 (aged 72); Porto Alegre
- Scientific career
- Fields: Paleontologist
- Workplaces: National Museum of Brazil

Carlos de Paula Couto, (Porto Alegre, August 30, 1910 – November 15, 1982) was a Brazilian paleontologist.

== Biography ==
Paula Couto was a researcher at the National Museum of Brazil in Rio de Janeiro, specialized in paleontology of mammals. Over 40 years, published dozens of scientific articles in top international publications.

He was also responsible for rescuing the work of the Danish palaeontologist Peter Wilhelm Lund (1801–1880), who translated under the title Memórias sobre a Paleontologia Brasileira (Memoirs of the Brazilian Paleontology) (1850).

Among his works stand out, Brazilian Paleontology (Mammals) (1953) and Treaty of Paleomastozoologia (1979).

== Awards ==
Awarded Fellowships from the John Simon Guggenheim Memorial Foundation in the Earth Science field of study in 1949, 1951 and 1966.
