= Paginula =

Paginula Temporal range: Eocene ~55.8–38 Ma

Scientific classification
- Domain: Eukaryota
- Kingdom: Animalia
- Phylum: Chordata
- Class: Mammalia
- Order: †Notoungulata
- Family: †Oldfieldthomasiidae
- Genus: †Paginula; Ameghino 1901

Type species
- †Paginula parca Ameghino, 1901

Species
- P. parca Ameghino 1901

Synonyms
- Acoelodus microdon Ameghino 1901

Extinct genus of mammals

Paginula is an extinct genus of oldfieldthomasiid notoungulate. It lived during the Eocene in what is now Argentina.
