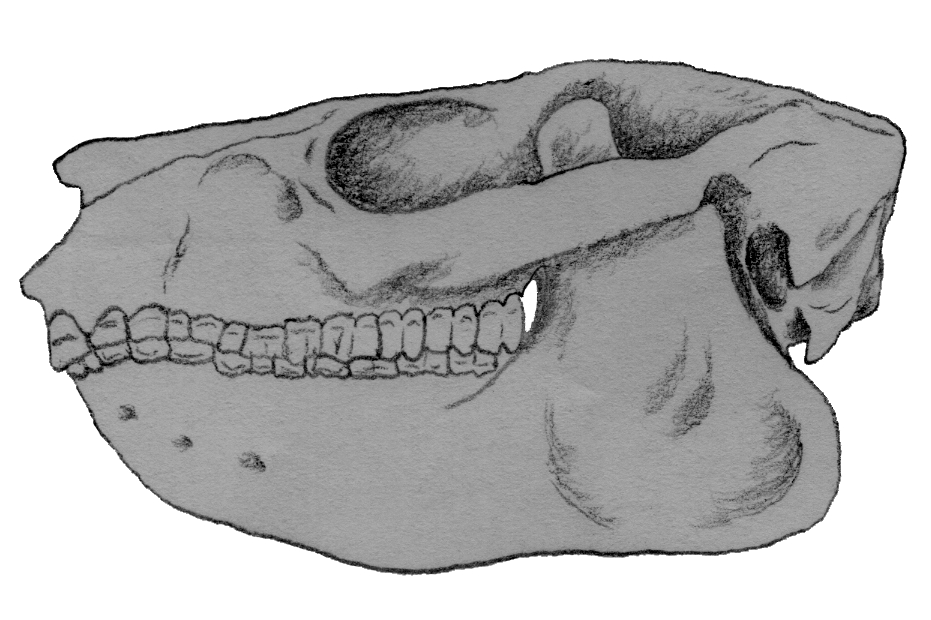
- Skull of Notopithecus adapinus

Scientific classification
- Kingdom: Animalia
- Phylum: Chordata
- Class: Mammalia
- Order: †Notoungulata
- Family: †Notopithecidae
- Genus: †Notopithecus; Ameghino, 1887

Type species
- †Notopithecus adapinus Ameghino, 1887

Species
- N. adapinus Ameghino, 1887; N. amplidens Ameghino, 1901

Synonyms
- Genus synonymy: Adpithecus Ameghino, 1901; Epipithecus Ameghino, 1904; Gonopithecus Ameghino, 1904; Species synonymy: Adpithecus secans Ameghino, 1901; Adpithecus subtenuis Ameghino, 1904; Antepithecus gradatus Ameghino, 1904; Epipithecus confluens Ameghino, 1904; Infrapithecus diversus Ameghino, 1902

= Notopithecus =

Notopithecus Temporal range: Middle-Late Eocene ~45–34 Ma

Extinct genus of notoungulates

Notopithecus is an extinct genus of Notoungulate, belonging to the suborder Typotheria. It lived from the Middle to the Late Eocene and its fossilized remains were discovered in South America.

== Description ==
This animal is known from numerous fossils, sufficiently complete to reconstruct the general appearance of the creature. It was superficially similar to a modern prairie dog, or a slender marmot. Its body was approximately 30–40 centimeters long, excluding the tail.

=== Skull ===
The skull was short, broad, and high; the temporal region and the tympanic bulla were enlarged. The dentition was complete, with incisor-shaped canines and without diastema. The premolars and molars were low-crowned (brachydont). The first upper incisor was well developed, and the first upper premolar was incisor-shaped. The other upper premolars were triangular in section and had a deep central dimple. The lower premolars were progressively more complex towards the posterior part of the mandible. The lower molars had a short anterior lobe and a posterior lobe with a well-developed entoconid.

=== Postcranial skeleton ===
Notopithecus had an agile and lithe body, with a long tail and four strong but slender limbs, allowing this animal to move rather quickly. The calcaneus had a rather short neck and the talus was characterized by a trapezoidal and asymmetrical trochlea, similar to Trachytherus, with a concave and smooth articular surface. Notopithecus also had a notable talar foramen, making its tarsus quite similar to other more specialized Typotheres, but still recalling in some way basal and archaic notoungulates, such as Colbertia, notably with the well-developed fibular tubercle of the calcaneus, in the lack of talar-cuboid contact and in the presence of a talar foramen.

== Description ==
Notopithecus was first described in 1897 by Florentino Ameghino, based on fossil remains found in Middle Eocene terrains of the Gran Barranca locality of the Sarmiento Formation in Argentina. The type species is Notopithecus adapinus, later uncovered in several other Middle Eocene sites elsewhere in Argentina. The species Adpithecus amplidens, from the Late Eocene, and described by Ameghino in 1901, was later attributed to the genus.

Notopithecus was initially considered as a basal primate by Ameghino, confusion still found in the genus name, "Notopithecus" meaning "Monkey of the South". Later, it was determined that it was a Notoungulate belonging to the suborder Typotheria, a group of mammals sharing similarities with rodents. Notopithecus was a member of the eponymous archaic subfamily Notopithecinae, and is usually nested as a basal member of the family Interatheriidae, a clade of typotheres that diversified mainly during the Oligocene and Miocene, giving rise to genera such as Interatherium, Protypotherium, Miocochilius and Cochilius. More recently, some studies tends to indicate that Notopithecus was nested, along with Transpithecus, within a different family, Notopithecidae, not including "true" interatheriids.

== Paleobiology ==
Notopithecus was a terrestrial animal whose brachydont teeth were well suited to eat low fern fronds and tender leaves.

== Bibliography ==
- F. Ameghino. 1897. Mamiferos Cretaceos de la Argentina. Segunda contribucion al conocimiento de la fauna mastologica de las capas con restos de Pyrotherium. Boletin Instituto Geografico Argentino 18:406-521
- F. Ameghino. 1901. Notices préliminaires sur des ongulés nouveaux des terrains crétacés de Patagonie [Preliminary notes on new ungulates from the Cretaceous terrains of Patagonia]. Boletin de la Academia Nacional de Ciencias de Córdoba 16:349-429
- M. A. Reguero and F. J. Prevosti. 2010. Rodent-like notoungulates (Typotheria) from Gran Barranca, Chubut Province, Argentina: phylogeny and systematics. In R. H. Madden, A. A. Carlini, M. G. Vucetich, R. F. Kay (eds.), The Paleontology of Gran Barranca: Evolution and Environmental Change through the Middle Cenozoic of Patagonia 148–165
