= Soncco Formation =

Geologic formation in Peru

- Stratigraphic range: Late Eocene-Early Oligocene; 43–30 Ma
- Type: Geological formation
- Unit of: San Jerónimo Group
- Sub-units: C, D & E Members
- Underlies: Punacancha Fm., Tinajani Fm.
- Overlies: K'ayra Formation
- Thickness: 1,600 m (5,200 ft)

Lithology
- Primary: Conglomerate, sandstone
- Other: Coal, lacustrine limestone

Location
- Coordinates: 13°20′12″S 71°44′28″W
- Region: Puno & Cusco Regions
- Country: Peru

Type section
- Named for: Soncco
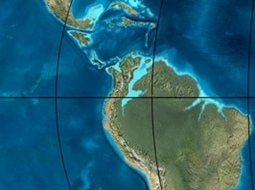
- Paleogeography of Northern South America, 35 Ma by Ron Blakey

Type locality of the Soncco Formation in Peru

The Soncco Formation is a Late Eocene to Early Oligocene geologic formation in southern Peru. The base of the formation at the contact with the K'ayra Formation is dated using fission track analysis at 43 Ma and the top, the contact with the Punacancha Formation, at 30 Ma. In other places the Tinajani Formation overlies the Soncco Formation. The formation has a thickness of 1,600 metres (5,200 ft).

== Misattributed ornithopod tracks ==
The formation was first dated to the Cretaceous, and fossil ornithopod tracks had been reported. Over 9,000 fossil tracks are said to be found within this formation. As the formation has been dated to the Paleogene, the tracks could not be attributed to dinosaurs.
