= Nemolestes =

Nemolestes Temporal range: Lutetian–Bartonian

Scientific classification
- Kingdom: Animalia
- Phylum: Chordata
- Class: Mammalia
- Order: †Sparassodonta
- Genus: †Nemolestes; Ameghino, 1902

Type species
- Nemolestes spalacotherinus Ameghino, 1902

Other species
- Nemolestes lagunafriensis Rangel et al., 2023

Extinct genus of sparassodont

Nemolestes is an extinct genus of sparassodont that lived in South America during the Lutetian and Bartonian stages of the Eocene epoch.

== Taxonomy ==
Silvenator brasiliensis, a taxon known from the Itaboraí fossil site of Brazil, was originally assigned to the genus Nemolestes; however, it was later reclassified as belonging to its own separate monotypic genus on the basis of its dental dissimilarity to other species of Nemolestes.

== Distribution ==
Nemolestes lagunafriensis is, as the name suggests, known from Laguna Fría, a Lutetian fossil site in Chubut, Argentina. Nemolestes spalacotherinus, the type species, is known from the Bartonian site of Colhué Huapí Norte in Chubut.
