= Ultrapithecus =

Ultrapithecus Temporal range: Middle Eocene ~40–38 Ma

Scientific classification
- Kingdom: Animalia
- Phylum: Chordata
- Class: Mammalia
- Order: †Notoungulata
- Family: †Oldfieldthomasiidae
- Genus: †Ultrapithecus; Ameghino, 1901
- Species: †U. rutilans

Binomial name
- †Ultrapithecus rutilans Ameghino, 1901

Extinct genus of notoungulates

Ultrapithecus is an extinct genus of oldfieldthomasiid notoungulate that lived during the Middle Eocene of what is now Argentina.

== Description ==
This genus is mostly known from its dentition, and a detailed reconstruction is impossible. It can be supposed that Ultrapithecus was, like its better known relatives, similar in size and appearance with a modern marmot. Its dentition consisted of low-crowned (brachydont) teeth. The molars were devoid of mesostyle, while the premolars lacked the fold of the metacone.

== Classification ==
The genus Ultrapithecus was first described in 1901 by Florentino Ameghino, based on fossil remains found in Argentine terrains dated from the end of the Middle Eocene. Ameghino described two species, Ultrapithecus rutilans and U. rusticulus, and thought that this genus was an archaic primate, hence its genus name, Ultrapithecus, meaning "monkey from the other side", referring to its discovery in South America instead of the Old World. Ultrapithecus was subsequently placed within the order Notoungulata, and the two species are considered synonyms, with U. rutilans taking precedence.

Ultrapithecus has historically been placed with the family Oldfieldthomasiidae, but more recent studies tends to indicate that this family was paraphyletic, with Ultrapithecus being a member of an Eocene adaptive radiation of archaic notoungulates, nested at the basis of the suborder Typotheria. It seems to have been closely related with the genus Kibenikhoria.
