= Oldfieldthomasiidae =

Oldfieldthomasiidae Temporal range: Late Paleocene-Late Eocene ~58.7–33.9 Ma

Scientific classification
- Kingdom: Animalia
- Phylum: Chordata
- Class: Mammalia
- Order: †Notoungulata
- Suborder: †Typotheria
- Family: †Oldfieldthomasiidae; Simpson, 1945

Genera
- †Allalmeia †Brachystephanus †Camargomendesia †Colbertia †Dolichostylodon †Itaboraitherium †Kibenikhoria †Maxschlosseria †Oldfieldthomasia †Paginula †Suniodon †Tsamnichoria †Ultrapithecus †Xenostephanus

Synonyms
- Acoelodidae Ameghino 1901

Extinct family of mammals

Oldfieldthomasiidae is an extinct family of notoungulate mammals known from the Late Paleocene to Late Eocene of South America. The family was classified by George Gaylord Simpson in 1945 and a synonym is Acoelodidae, defined by Florentino Ameghino in 1901.

== Etymology ==
The family is named after British zoologist Oldfield Thomas.

== Fossils ==
Fossils of the family Oldfieldthomasiidae have been found in southern South America, in Argentina, Bolivia, Brazil and Chile.
