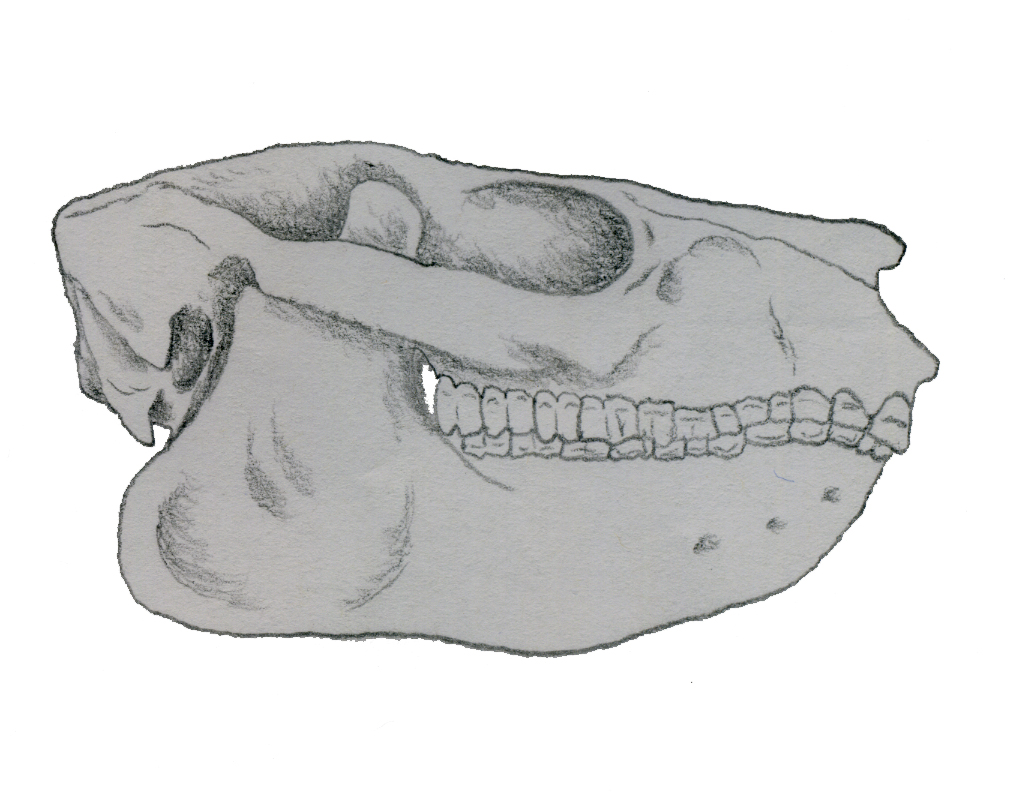
- Notopithecus

Scientific classification
- Kingdom: Animalia
- Phylum: Chordata
- Class: Mammalia
- Order: †Notoungulata
- Suborder: †Typotheria
- Family: †Notopithecidae; Ameghino, 1897

Species
- †Notopithecus; †Eupithecops; †Guilielmoscottia; †Antepithecus; †Transpithecus

= Notopithecidae =

Notopithecidae Temporal range: Paleocene–Oligocene

Extinct family of mammals

Notopithecidae is a family of typotherine notoungulates known from Paleogene deposits of the San Juan Formation, Argentina. The name of the clade derives from an error, Florentino Ameghino assumed the namesake of the family, Notopithecus, was a primate.

== Description ==
Notopithecids had low crowned teeth and relatively underived dentition when compared to later typotheres. They had brachyodont molars. They most likely walked plantigrade, indicated by an astragalar foramen and a shallow and asymmetric trochela.

== Classification ==
Notopithecidae has had some debate as to whether it is even a valid family, occasionally being placed within Interatheriidae. However, most literature supports Notopithecidae being its own family.
