= Acoelodus =

Acoelodus Temporal range: Early-Middle Eocene ~48–37 Ma

Scientific classification
- Domain: Eukaryota
- Kingdom: Animalia
- Phylum: Chordata
- Class: Mammalia
- Order: †Notoungulata
- Genus: †Acoelodus; Ameghino 1897

Type species
- Acoelodus oppositus Ameghino, 1897

Species
- A. debilitatus Ameghino 1901; A. oppositus Ameghino 1897; A. proclivus Ameghino 1902; A. terminalis Ameghino 1902

Extinct genus of mammals

Acoelodus is an extinct genus of placental mammal, belonging to the order Notoungulata. The genus was first described by Florentino Ameghino in 1897. Its fossilized remains were discovered in Casamayoran terrains from Argentine Patagonia.
