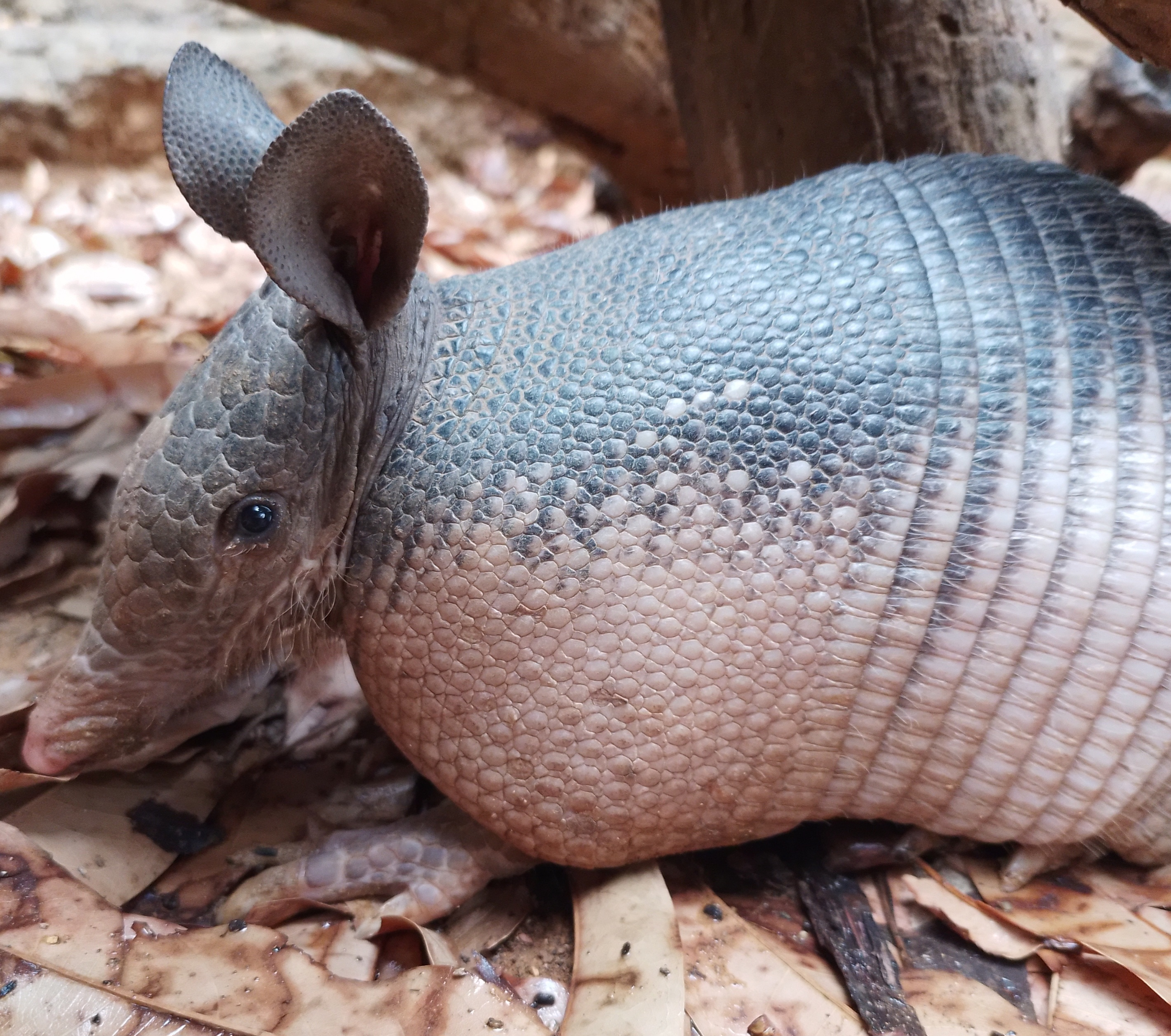
- Nine-banded armadillo

Conservation status
- Least Concern (IUCN 3.1)

Scientific classification
- Kingdom: Animalia
- Phylum: Chordata
- Class: Mammalia
- Order: Cingulata
- Family: Dasypodidae
- Genus: Dasypus
- Species: D. novemcinctus

Binomial name
- Dasypus novemcinctus Linnaeus, 1758

Synonyms
- Tatusia novemcincta (Linnaeus, 1758)

= Nine-banded armadillo =

Species of armadillo native to South America

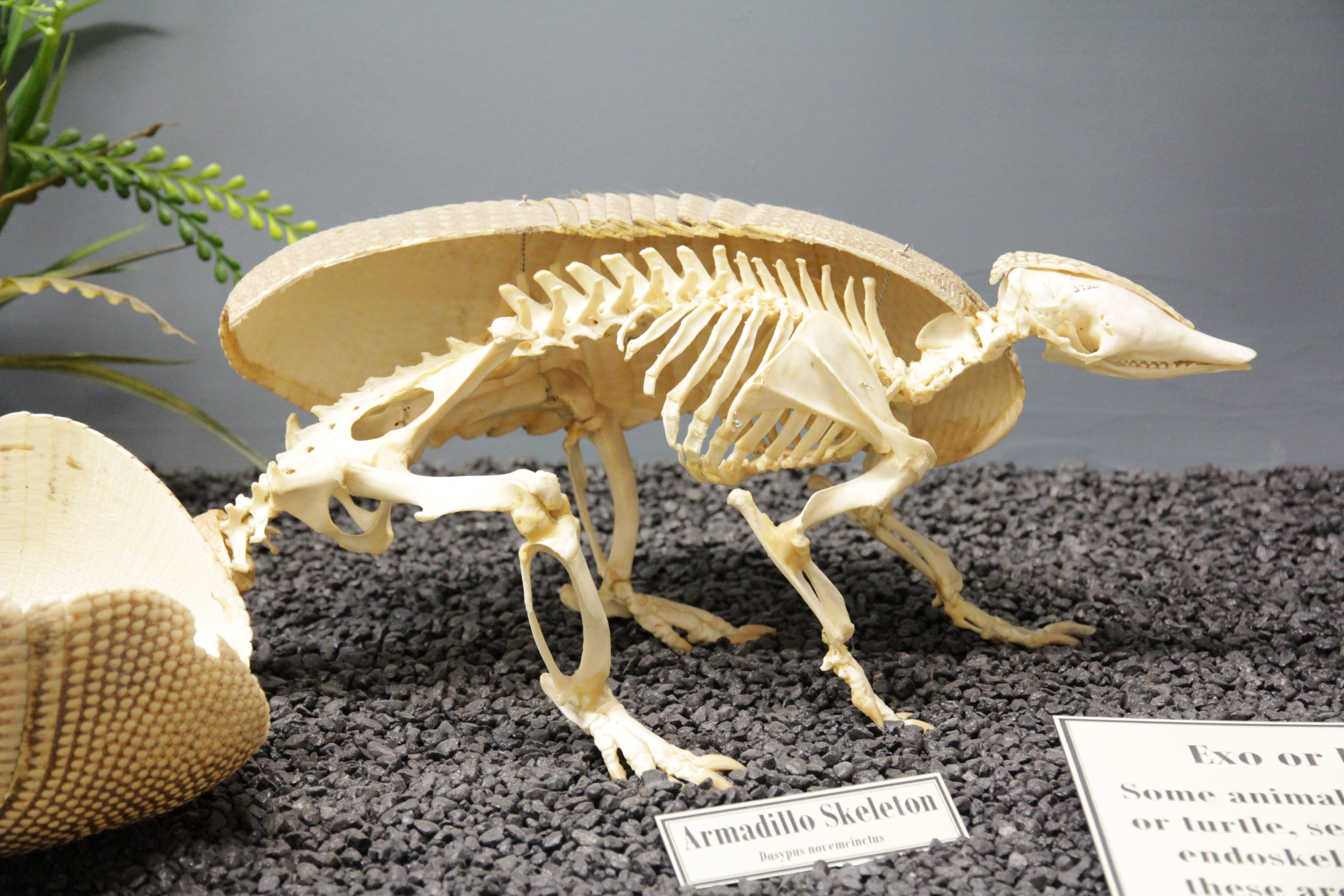
Skeleton of nine-banded armadillo on display at the Museum of Osteology

The nine-banded armadillo (Dasypus novemcinctus), also called the nine-banded long-nosed armadillo or common armadillo, is a species of armadillo native to South America. The Mexican long-nosed armadillo of North America was formerly treated as a subspecies of the nine-banded armadillo.

The nine-banded armadillo is a solitary, mainly nocturnal animal, found in many kinds of habitats, from mature and secondary rainforests to grassland and dry scrub. It is an insectivore, feeding chiefly on ants, termites, and other small invertebrates. The armadillo can jump 91–120 cm (3–4 ft) straight in the air if sufficiently frightened, making it a particular danger on roads.

== Subspecies ==
- D. n. aequatorialis Lönnberg, 1913
- D. n. fenestratus Peters, 1864
- D. n. hoplites Allen, 1911
- D. n. mexianae (Hagmann, 1908)
- D. n. novemcinctus Linnaeus, 1758

== Description ==
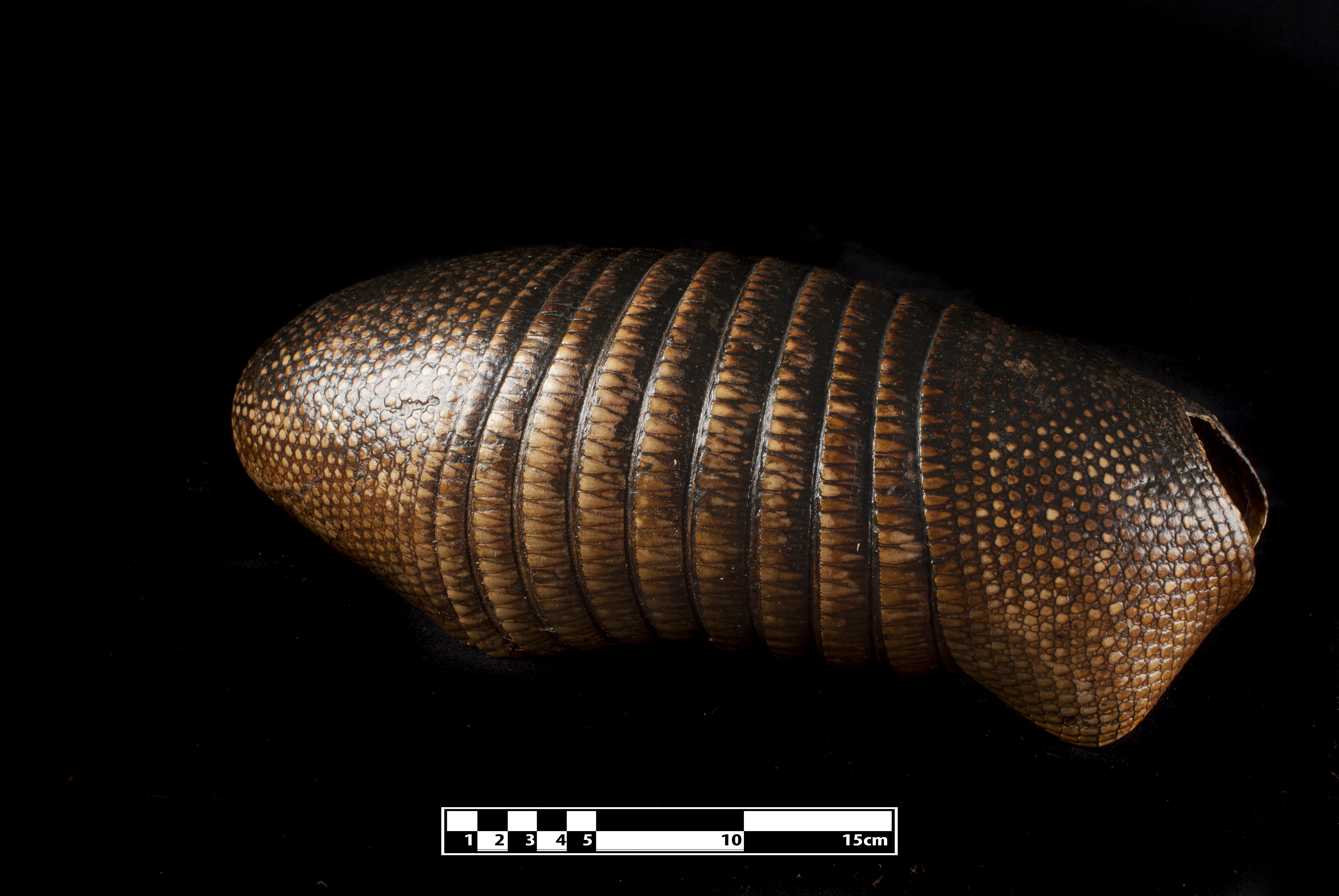
Taxidermized armadillo shell

Nine-banded armadillos generally weigh from 2.5–6.5 kg (5.5–14.3 lb), though the largest specimens can scale up to 10 kg (22 lb). They are one of the largest species of armadillos. Head and body length is 38–58 cm (15–23 in), which combines with the 26–53 cm (10–21 in) tail, for a total length of 64–107 cm (25–42 in). They stand 15–25 cm (5.9–9.8 in) tall at the top of the shell. The outer shell is composed of ossified dermal scutes covered by nonoverlapping, keratinized epidermal scales, which are connected by flexible bands of skin. This armor covers the back, sides, head, tail, and outside surfaces of the legs. The underside of the body and the inner surfaces of the legs have no armored protection. Instead, they are covered by tough skin and a layer of coarse hair. The vertebrae attach to the carapace. The claws on the middle toes of the forefeet are elongated for digging, though not to the same degree as those of the much larger giant armadillo of South America. Their low metabolic rate and poor thermoregulation make them best suited for semitropical environments. Unlike the South American three-banded armadillos, the nine-banded armadillo cannot roll itself into a ball. It is, however, capable of traversing rivers by inflating its intestines and floating, or by sinking and running across the riverbed. The second is possible due to its ability to hold its breath for up to six minutes, an adaptation originally developed for allowing the animal to keep its snout submerged in soil for extended periods while foraging. Although nine is the typical number of bands on the nine-banded armadillo, the actual number varies by geographic range. Armadillos possess the teeth typical of all sloths and anteaters. The teeth are all small, peg-like molars with open roots and no enamel. Incisors do form in the embryos, but quickly degenerate and are usually absent by birth.

== Habitat ==
The nine-banded armadillo evolved in a warm, rainy environment, and is still most commonly found in regions resembling its ancestral home. As a very adaptable animal, though, it can also be found in scrublands, open prairies, and tropical rainforests. It cannot thrive in particularly cold or dry environments, as its large surface area, which is not well insulated by fat, makes it especially susceptible to heat and water loss.

== Range ==
The nine-banded armadillo ranges through most of South America except for the Guiana Shield area where the Guianan long-nosed armadillo Dasypus guianensis, a new species of armadillo officially described in June 2024, exists.

== Diet ==
Nine-banded armadillos are generally insectivores. They forage for meals by thrusting their snouts into loose soil and leaf litter and frantically digging in erratic patterns, stopping occasionally to dig up grubs, beetles (perhaps the main portion of this species' prey selection), ants, termites, grasshoppers, other insects, millipedes, centipedes, arachnids, worms, and other terrestrial invertebrates, which their sensitive noses can detect through 8 in (20 cm) of soil. They then lap up the insects with their sticky tongues. Nine-banded armadillos have been observed to roll about on ant hills to dislodge and consume the resident ants. They supplement their diets with amphibians and small reptiles, especially in more wintery months when such prey tends to be more sluggish, and occasionally bird eggs and baby mammals. Carrion is also eaten, although perhaps the species is most attracted to the maggots borne by carcasses rather than the meat itself. Less than 10% of the diet of this species is composed by nonanimal matter, though fungi, tubers, fruits, and seeds are occasionally eaten.

== Behavior ==
Nine-banded armadillos are solitary, largely nocturnal animals that come out to forage around dusk. They are extensive burrowers, with a single animal sometimes maintaining up to 12 burrows on its range. These burrows are roughly 20 cm (8 in) wide, 210 cm (7 ft) deep, and 760 cm (25 ft) long. Armadillos mark their territory with urine, feces, and excretions from scent glands found on the eyelids, nose, and feet. Males hold breeding territories and may become aggressive in order to keep other males out of their home range to increase chances of pairing with a female. Territorial disputes are settled by kicking and chasing. When they are not foraging, armadillos shuffle along fairly slowly, stopping occasionally to sniff the air for signs of danger.

=== Predation ===
If alarmed, nine-banded armadillos can flee with surprising speed. Occasionally, a large predator may be able to ambush the armadillo before it can clear a distance, and breach the hard carapace with a well-placed bite or swipe. If the fleeing escape fails, the armadillo may quickly dig a shallow trench and lodge itself inside. Predators are rarely able to dislodge the animal once it has burrowed itself, and abandon their prey when they cannot breach the armadillo's armor or grasp its tapered tail. Due to their softer carapaces, juvenile armadillos are more likely to fall victim to natural predation and their cautious behavior generally reflects this. Young nine-banded armadillos tend to forage earlier in the day and are more wary of the approach of an unknown animal (including humans) than are adults. Their known natural predators include cougars (perhaps the leading predator), maned wolves, jaguars, and large raptors. Many thousands fall victim to roadkill caused by auto accidents every year.

== Reproduction ==
Mating takes place during a two-to-three month long mating season, which occurs from November–January. A single egg is fertilized and develops into a blastocyst, but implantation is delayed for three to four months to ensure the young will not be born during an unfavorable time. Once the blastocyst does implant in the uterus it splits into four identical embryos via collapse of the common amnion and subsequent division of the embryonic shield. Each of the four embryos has a separate amnion and umbilical cord, but all four are attached to a common placenta. The gestation period is four months. At birth, they weigh 85 g (3 oz). After birth, the quadruplets remain in the burrow, living off the mother's milk for about three months. They then begin to forage with the mother, eventually leaving after six months to a year.

Nine-banded armadillos reach sexual maturity at the age of one year, and reproduce every year for the rest of their 12-to-15-year lifespans. A single female can produce up to 56 young over the course of her life. This high reproductive rate is a major cause of the species' rapid expansion.

== Effect on the environment ==
The foraging of nine-banded armadillo can cause mild damage to the root systems of certain plants. Skunks, cotton rats, burrowing owls, and rattlesnakes can be found living in abandoned armadillo burrows.

They are typically hunted for their meat, which is said to taste like pork, but are more frequently killed as a result of their tendency to steal the eggs of poultry and game birds. This has caused certain populations of the nine-banded armadillo to become threatened, although the species as a whole is under no immediate threat. They are also valuable for use in medical research, as they are among the few mammals other than humans susceptible to leprosy.

== See also ==
- Mexican long-nosed armadillo, recently elevated from a subspecies of the nine-banded armadillo.
