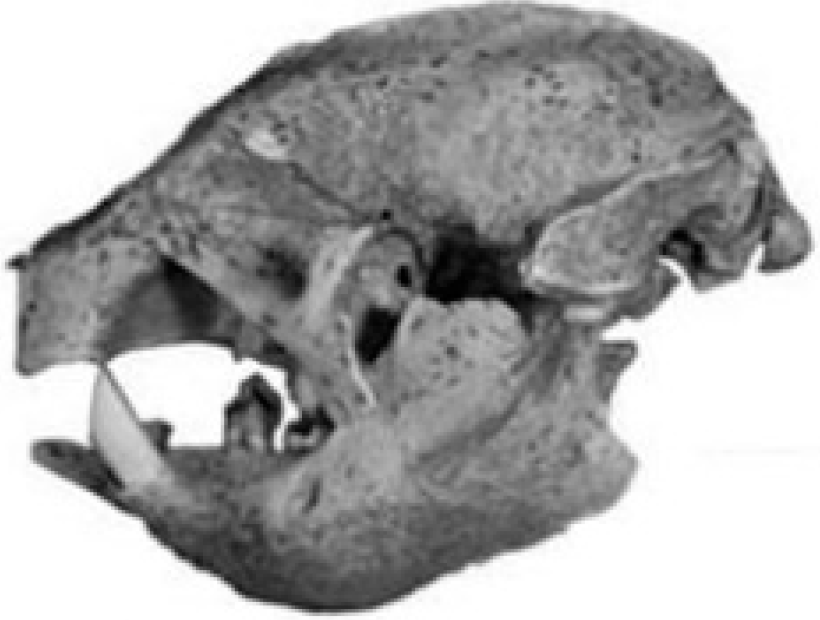
- Acratocnus ye skull

Scientific classification
- Kingdom: Animalia
- Phylum: Chordata
- Class: Mammalia
- Order: Pilosa
- Suborder: Folivora
- Family: †Megalocnidae
- Genus: †Acratocnus; Anthony 1916

Type species
- †Acratocnus odontrigonus Anthony, 1916

Species
- †Acratocnus antillensis Matthew 1931; †Acratocnus odontrigonus Anthony 1916; †Acratocnus ye MacPhee et al. 2000; †Acratocnus simorhynchus Rega, McFarlane, Lundberg & Christenson, 2002

Synonyms
- Habanocnus Mayo, 1978; A. antilliensis: Miocnus antillensis Matthew, 1931; Habanocnus hoffstetteri Mayo, 1978; Habanocnus paulacoutoi Mayo, 1978; Galerocnus jaimezi Arredondo, 1997; Paramiocnus riveroi Arredondo and Arredondo, 2000

= Acratocnus =

Acratocnus Temporal range: Late Pleistocene (Rancholabrean) ~0.126–0.011 Ma

Genus of sloths

Acratocnus is an extinct genus of Caribbean sloths that were found on Cuba, Hispaniola (today the Dominican Republic and Haiti), and Puerto Rico during the Late Pleistocene and early-mid Holocene.

== Taxonomy ==
The genus was first described by American paleontologist Harold Elmer Anthony in 1916 based on the species A. odontrigonus, which was found in cave deposits in Puerto Rico. Acratocnus antillensis was first described by William Diller Matthew in 1931. The species was identified based on fossil remains found in various locations in Cuba, including the paleontological deposit Las Llanadas, Sancti Spíritus Province. Acratocnus ye was first described by Ross D. E. MacPhee, Jennifer L. White, and Charles A. Woods in 2000. The species was identified based on fossil remains found in various locations in Haiti, including the type locality at Trouing Vape`Deron, Plain Formon, Département du Sud. The holotype specimen, UF170533, consists of a skull and mandible. Acratocnus simorhynchus was first described in 2002. The species was identified based on fossil remains found in Cueva del Perezoso, located in Jaragua National Park, Pedernales Province, Dominican Republic. The holotype, catalogued as ALF 7194, includes an unusually well-preserved skull, mandible, and post-cranial elements.

Like all of the Antillean sloths, Acratocnus was formerly thought on the basis of morphological evidence to be a member of the family Megalonychidae, which was also thought to include Choloepus, the two-toed tree sloths. Recent molecular evidence has clarified that Caribbean sloths represent a separate basal branch of the sloth radiation, now placed in the family Megalocnidae.

== Description ==
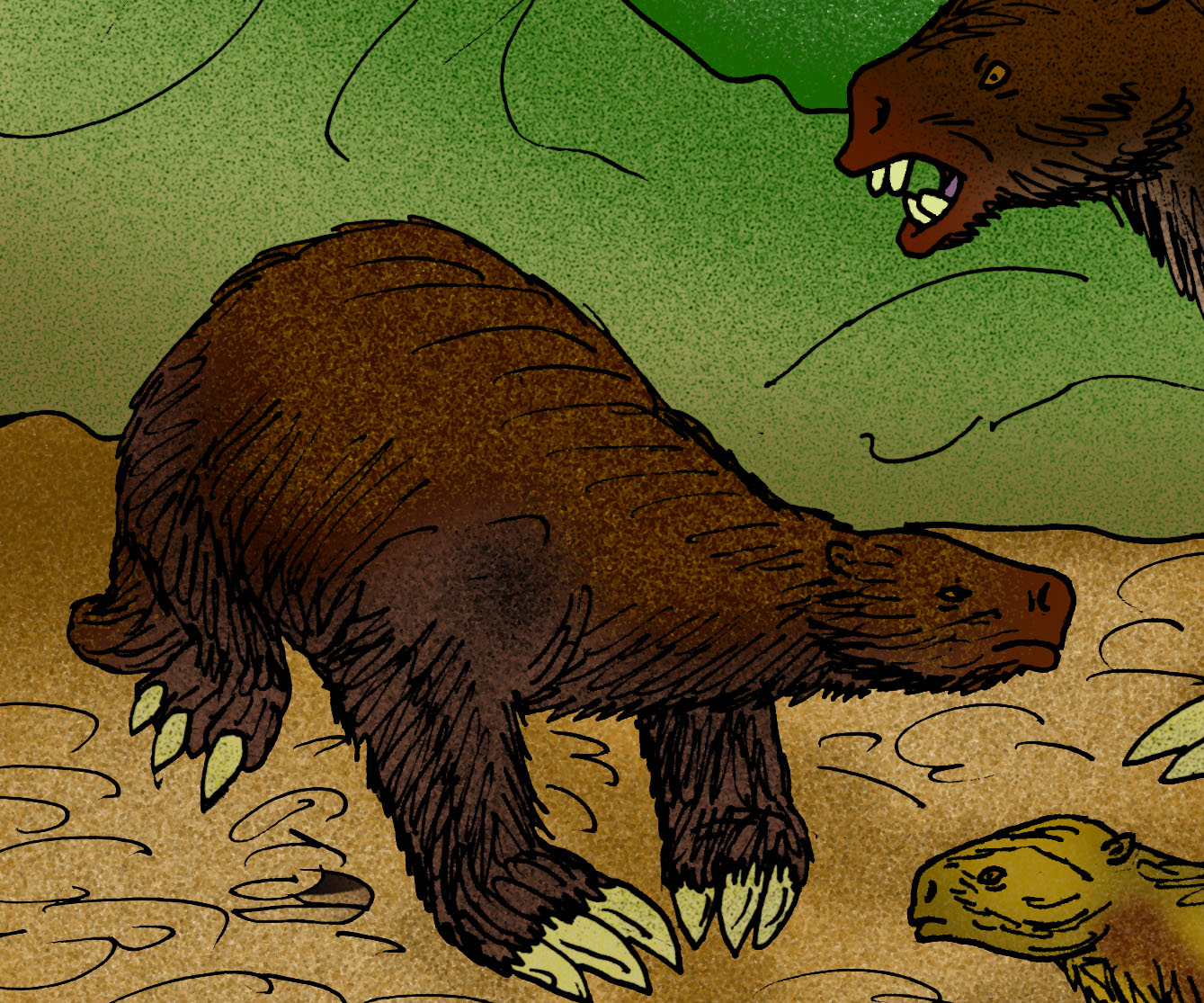
Restoration of A. antilliensis

Acratocnus ye and A. odontrigonus have been estimated to weigh approximately 15 kilograms (33 lb), while A. antillensis is estimated to be somewhat smaller at around 10 kilograms (22 lb). All species of Acratocnus were somewhat larger than living tree sloths, though small in comparison to mainland ground sloths. The skulls of Acratocnus are markedly domed along their sagittal crests. The skull of A. antillensis is distinguished from other species within the genus Acratocnus by its prominent palatine foramina and a short, pointed symphyseal spout. The skull of A. simorhynchus is distinguished by its prominent frontal sinuses, resulting in a foreshortened snout. The species also exhibits a pronounced medio-lateral flare of the rostrum, a short symphyseal spout, and deep mandibular corpus. The skull of A. ye is distinguished by its flattened nose, giving it a "snub nosed" look.

== Ecology ==
Species of Acratocnus inhabited forested environments. The various species are though to have been semi-arboreal, having spent some of their time in trees and some on the ground, with their hooked claws being used both for climbing and terrestrial foraging. Dental microwear indicates that A. odontrigonus was a generalist browser, having a dietary pattern similar to the extant Choloepus.

== Extinction ==
The various species of Caribbean sloths are thought to have become extinct following human arrival to the Caribbean during the mid-Holocene around 6,000 years ago based on the timing of the last radiocarbon dates of Caribbean sloths. Several radiocarbon dates of A. antiliensis on Cuba support the presence of the species on the island up until human arrival. Remains of Caribbean sloths have been found in a number of archaeological sites suggesting that they may have been consumed by the earliest inhabitants of the Caribbean, although evidence of hunting is inconclusive.

== See also ==
- Pilosans of the Caribbean
