= Tardigrada (disambiguation) =

Tardigrada is the scientific name for a phylum within Panarthropoda: the tardigrades

Tardigrada may also refer to a taxon within Xenarthra, specifically one of the following:

- Folivora, i. e. sloths
- the crown group of Folivora (this meaning is according to McKenna, Wyss and Flynn 2006)
- Bradypodoidea (including Choloepus) – see Bradypodidae and Choloepus
- Pilosa except ground sloths, i. e. Vermilingua, Bradypodidae, Choloepus and Entelopidae (this meaning is according to Haeckel 1895)
