= Imagocnus =

Imagocnus Temporal range: Burdigalian (Hemingfordian) ~18 Ma

Scientific classification
- Domain: Eukaryota
- Kingdom: Animalia
- Phylum: Chordata
- Class: Mammalia
- Order: Pilosa
- Family: †Megalocnidae
- Genus: †Imagocnus; MacPhee & Iturralde-Vinent 1994

Type species
- †Imagocnus zazae MacPhee & Iturralde-Vinent 1994

Extinct genus of ground sloth

Imagocnus is an extinct genus of ground sloth from the Early Miocene (Burdigalian) Lagunitas Formation of Cuba.

== Description ==
This sloth resided in the Antilles and showed a range of body size, from Parocnus-sized to Megalocnus-sized or larger. Its relationships to other Antillean sloths are not immediately clear, though the genera Megalocnus and Parocnus, other ground sloths, are its most likely relatives.

== See also ==
- Pilosans of the Caribbean
