= Pilosans of the Caribbean =

Order of mammals from Caribbean bioregion

The mammalian order Pilosa, which includes the sloths and anteaters, includes various species from the Caribbean region. Many species of sloths are known from the Greater Antilles, all of which became extinct over the last millennia, but some sloths and anteaters survive on islands closer to the mainland.

For the purposes of this article, the "Caribbean" includes all islands in the Caribbean Sea (except for small islets close to the mainland) and the Bahamas, Turks and Caicos Islands, and Barbados, which are not in the Caribbean Sea but biogeographically belong to the same Caribbean bioregion.

== Overview ==
Extinct sloths are known from the three Greater Antilles of Cuba, Hispaniola, and Puerto Rico and several smaller Antillean islands, but they are missing from the fourth of the Greater Antilles, Jamaica. These were formerly believed, on the basis of morphological studies, to be part of the family Megalonychidae, which includes some of the extinct giant ground sloths, such as Megalonyx, and was formerly also thought to include the living two-toed sloths (Choloepus) of the American mainland. Recent molecular evidence from collagen and mitochondrial DNA sequences has shown that this construction of Megalonychidae is polyphyletic; the Caribbean sloths form a basal branch of the sloth evolutionary tree and are not close to either Choloepus or Megalonyx. The extinct Caribbean sloths appear to represent a single radiation which has been designated as the family Megalocnidae. All Greater Antillean sloths are now extinct; their extinction by ~4400 BP (uncalibrated radiocarbon date) apparently postdated the extinction of the mainland ground sloths by about six thousand years, and coincided (to within a thousand years) with the arrival of humans on the islands. These sloths apparently had a wide range of locomotor habits corresponding to varying degrees of arboreality, but were generally more terrestrial than extant tree sloths. They had been present on the Antilles since the early Oligocene, 32 million years ago. The subdivision of Antillean sloths into several subfamilies has been interpreted as implying at least a diphyletic origin for them, requiring two or more separate colonization events; however, the molecular results indicate the group is monophyletic.

In addition to the Greater Antillean sloths, some other pilosans are still extant on islands close to the Central and South American mainland. This includes several anteaters and a member of the other extant sloth family, that of the three-toed sloths, restricted to a small island in Panama. The record of a tamandua from Cozumel, off Mexico, was probably in error.

The genera of Caribbean pilosans are classified as follows (with extinct taxa designated by the dagger, †):

- Order Pilosa
  - Suborder Folivora (sloths)
    - Family Bradypodidae: Bradypus
    - Family Choloepodidae: Choloepus
    - Family †Megalocnidae
      - †Acratocnus
      - †Neocnus
      - Incertae sedis: †Paulocnus
      - Subfamily ??
        - †Megalocnus
        - †Mesocnus
    - Family †Megalonychidae: †Paramiocnus
    - Incertae sedis: †Imagocnus, †Galerocnus, several unidentified genera
  - Suborder Vermilingua (anteaters)
    - Family Cyclopedidae: Cyclopes
    - Family Myrmecophagidae: Tamandua

== Cuba ==
Cuba is the largest of the Greater Antilles. A diverse assortment of sloths is known.

- Acratocnus antillensis (previously Miocnus antillensis), a sloth known exclusively from Cuba. Isolated femora referred to separate species Habanocnus hoffstetteri and H. paulacoutoi fall within the range of variation of this species.
- Galerocnus jaimezi, a sloth.
- Imagocnus zazae, a large sloth from the early Miocene fauna of Domo de Zaza. Although it is recognizably megalocnid, its precise relations are obscure. A large pelvis found at Domo de Zaza may indicate the presence of another, even larger sloth; alternatively, I. zazae may have been variable in size.
- Neocnus gliriformis (previously Microcnus gliriformis), a sloth found only on Cuba.
- Megalocnus rodens, a common sloth in faunas from western and central Cuba. It has been radiocarbon-dated to about 6000 years before present.
- Neocnus major, also known from Cuba alone. It includes the previously recognized N. minor and N. baireiensis and may not itself be distinct from N. gliriformis.
- Paramiocnus riveroi, a large and possibly arboreal sloth known from limited remains.
- Parocnus browni (previously Mesocnus browni), a sloth related to Hispaniolan P. serus. The previously recognized species Mesocnus torrei and Mesocnus herrerai are now regarded as identical to P. browni. Remains of P. browni have been radiocarbon-dated to about 5000 years before present.

== Hispaniola ==
Hispaniola, the second largest of the Greater Antilles, is divided into Haiti and the Dominican Republic. It had a diverse sloth fauna.

- Acratocnus simorhynchus, a sloth from eastern Hispaniola known from remains dated to about 20,000 years before present.
- Acratocnus ye, a sloth known only from Hispaniola.
- Megalocnus zile, a sloth known from both Hispaniola and the satellite island of Tortuga, apparently much rarer than its Cuban relative M. rodens.
- Neocnus comes (previously Acratocnus comes and Synocnus comes), a large Neocnus commonly found in cave deposits throughout Hispaniola. Several remains have been radiocarbon-dated, the youngest to about 5,000 years before present.
- Neocnus dousman, a medium-sized Neocnus found throughout Hispaniola. A single radiocarbon-dated specimen is about 10,000 years old.
- Neocnus toupiti, a small Neocnus and perhaps the smallest sloth known, found in Haiti.
- Parocnus serus, a sloth known from Hispaniola and the satellite islands of Tortuga and Gonâve. A specimen has been radiocarbon-dated to over 14,000 years before present.

== Tortuga ==
Tortuga is an island off northern Haiti.

- Megalocnus zile, a sloth known also from mainland Hispaniola.
- Parocnus serus, a sloth found also on mainland Hispaniola and Gonâve.

== Gonâve ==
Gonâve is an island off southwestern Haiti.

- Parocnus serus, a sloth also known from mainland Hispaniola and Tortuga.

== Puerto Rico ==
Only one sloth is known from the Quaternary of Puerto Rico, the easternmost of the Greater Antilles; another species is known from much older, Oligocene, sediments.

- Acratocnus odontrigonus, a sloth known only from Puerto Rico. Acratocnus major, described on the basis of somewhat larger Puerto Rican sloth bones, simply represents large individuals of A. odontrigonus.
- A small sloth femur has been found at an early Oligocene site in southwestern Puerto Rico. It is not sufficiently diagnostic to permit conclusive identification as a megalocnid.

== Grenada ==
Grenada is the southernmost island of the main Lesser Antillean island arc.

- Three teeth of a sloth have been found in a late Pliocene or early Pleistocene deposit that also yielded the capybara Hydrochoerus gaylordi. The teeth differ in size and may represent either one or two species and although recognizably megalocnid, their precise relationships cannot be determined.

== Trinidad ==
Trinidad is a large island off northeastern Venezuela. It hosts two species of anteaters that are also found on mainland South America.

- Cyclopes didactylus, the pygmy anteater, also known from Mexico to Brazil.
- Tamandua tetradactyla, the southern tamandua, also known across South America east of the Andes.

== Curaçao ==
Curaçao is a Dutch island off northwestern Venezuela.

- Paulocnus petrifactus, a medium-sized sloth that may be related to Antillean Acratocnus.

== Escudo de Veraguas ==
Escudo de Veraguas is an island off northern Panama. Despite its small size, it supports two mammal species found nowhere else: the bat Dermanura watsoni incomitata and the only extant Caribbean sloth.

- Bradypus pygmaeus, a critically endangered small sloth related to mainland B. variegatus.

== Related articles ==
- List of extinct late Pleistocene North American Pilosans
- List of extant Central American Pilosans
- List of extant South American Pilosans

== Literature cited ==
- Anderson, R.P. and Handley, C.O., Jr. 2001. A new species of three-toed sloth (Mammalia: Xenarthra) from Panama, with a review of the genus Bradypus. Proceedings of the Biological Society of Washington 114:1–33.
- Arredondo, C. and Arredondo, O. 2000. Nuevo genero y especie de perezoso (Edentata: Megalonychidae) del Pleistoceno de Cuba. Revista Biologia 14(1):66–72.
- Arredondo, C. and Rivero, M. 1997. Nuevo genero y especie de Megalonychidae del Cuaternario Cubano. Revista Biologia 11:105–112.
- Cooke, S. B.; Dávalos, L. M.; Mychajliw, A. M.; Turvey, S. T.; Upham, N. S. (2017). "Anthropogenic Extinction Dominates Holocene Declines of West Indian Mammals". Annual Review of Ecology, Evolution, and Systematics. 48 (1): 301–327. doi:10.1146/annurev-ecolsys-110316-022754.
- Gardner, A.L. 2005. Order Pilosa. Pp. 100–103 in Wilson, D.E. and Reeder, D.M. (eds.). Mammal Species of the World: a taxonomic and geographic reference. 3rd ed. Baltimore: The Johns Hopkins University Press, 2 vols., 2142 pp. ISBN 978-0-8018-8221-0
- Jones, J.K., Jr., and Lawlor, T.E. 1965. Mammals from Isla Cozumel, México, with description of a new species of harvest mouse. University of Kansas Publications, Museum of Natural History 16:409–419.
- Koopman, K. F. (1959). "The Zoogeographical Limits of the West Indies". Journal of Mammalogy. 40 (2): 236–240. doi:10.2307/1376440. JSTOR 1376440.
- MacPhee, R.D.E., Singer, R. and Diamond, M. 2000. Late Cenozoic land mammals from Grenada, Lesser Antillean island-arc. American Museum Novitates 3302:1–20.
- Rega, E., McFarlane, D.A., Lundberg, J. and Christenson, K. 2002. A new megalonychid sloth from the Late Wisconsinan of the Dominican Republic. Caribbean Journal of Science 38(1–2):11–19.
- Steadman, D.W.; Martin, P.S.; MacPhee, R.D.E.; Jull, A.J.T.; McDonald, H.G.; Woods, C.A.; Iturralde-Vinent, M.; Hodgins, G.W.L. (2005). "Asynchronous extinction of late Quaternary sloths on continents and islands". Proceedings of the National Academy of Sciences. 102 (33): 11763–11768. Bibcode:2005PNAS..10211763S. doi:10.1073/pnas.0502777102. PMC 1187974. PMID 16085711.
- White, Jennifer (1993). "Indicators of locomotor habits in xenarthrans: Evidence for locomotor heterogeneity among fossil sloths". Journal of Vertebrate Paleontology. 13 (2): 230–242. Bibcode:1993JVPal..13..230W. doi:10.1080/02724634.1993.10011502. JSTOR 4523502.
- White, J.L.; MacPhee, R.D.E. (2001). "The sloths of the West Indies: a systematic and phylogenetic review". In Woods, C.A.; Sergile, F.E. (eds.). Biogeography of the West Indies: Patterns and Perspectives. Boca Raton, London, New York, and Washington, D.C.: CRC Press. pp. 201–235. doi:10.1201/9781420039481-14. ISBN 978-0-8493-2001-9.
