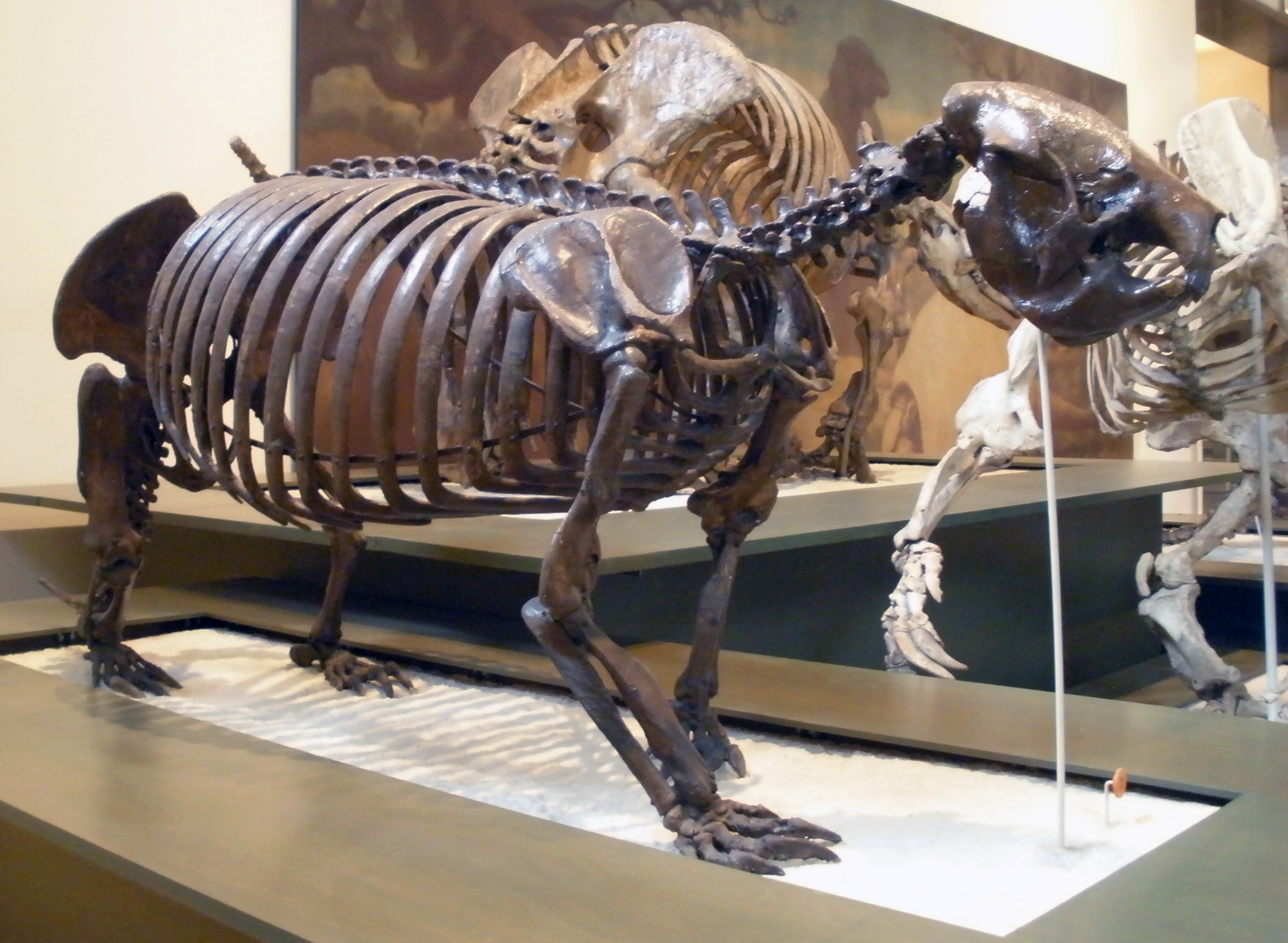
- Megalocnus rodens, an extinct Cuban megalocnid sloth (AMNH)

Scientific classification
- Kingdom: Animalia
- Phylum: Chordata
- Class: Mammalia
- Order: Pilosa
- Suborder: Folivora
- Family: †Megalocnidae; Kraglievich, 1923

Genera
- †Acratocnus; †Imagocnus; †Megalocnus; †Mesocnus; †Neocnus; †Parocnus

Synonyms
- Megalocninae Kraglievich, 1923; Mesocnini Varona, 1974; Megalocni McKenna and Bell, 1997; Megalocnoidea Delsuc et al., 2019; Acratocnidae Delsuc et al., 2019; Parocnidae Delsuc et al., 2019

= Megalocnidae =

Megalocnidae Temporal range: Early Oligocene–Holocene

Extinct Greater Antilles sloth family

Megalocnidae is an extinct family (alternatively considered to be a superfamily as Megalocnoidea) of sloths, native to the islands of the Greater Antilles from the Early Oligocene to the Mid-Holocene. They are known from Cuba, Hispaniola and Puerto Rico, but are absent from Jamaica. While they were formerly placed in the Megalonychidae alongside two-toed sloths and ground sloths like Megalonyx, recent mitochondrial DNA and collagen sequencing studies place them as the earliest diverging group basal to all other sloths. or as an outgroup to Megatherioidea. They displayed significant diversity in body size and lifestyle, with Megalocnus being terrestrial and probably weighing several hundred kilograms, while Neocnus was likely arboreal and similar in weight to extant tree sloths, at less than 10 kilograms.

== Origin ==
It is thought that sloths arrived in the Caribbean from South America (where they arose) around the Eocene-Oligocene boundary about 33 million years ago, when there was a significant sea level drop caused by a glaciation episode. This has been associated with the GAARlandia (Greater Aves Antilles Ridge) hypothesis, where the Aves Ridge is suggested to have formed a land bridge during the interval, allowing overland migration into the Greater Antilles. The existence of such a land bridge has been questioned because of the lack of geological evidence for the Aves Ridge having been subaerially exposed as well as the fact that many other South American animals (such as marsupials and ungulates) are absent from the Greater Antilles, making a complete land bridge unlikely. (Note: The main groups of terrestrial mammals to colonize the Antilles, sloths, caviomorph rodents and platyrrhine monkeys, have all displayed a facility for oceanic dispersal or island hopping in other settings. For example, megalonychid and mylodontid ground sloths reached North America from South America prior to formation of a complete land bridge, and both caviomorphs and platyrrhines originally reached South America by rafting across the Atlantic from Africa.) The earliest evidence suggesting the presence of sloths in the Caribbean is a partial femur from the Early Oligocene of Puerto Rico. Other pre-Pleistocene fossil remains include Imagocnus from the Early Miocene of Cuba, and an indeterminate species from the Late Miocene of the Dominican Republic.

== Description ==
Megalocnid sloths were relatively small compared to mainland ground sloths, though they were the largest mammals native to the Caribbean islands with the largest species Megalocnus rodens estimated to have weighed around 146 kilograms (322 lb) or possibly as much as 270 kilograms (600 lb), with the smallest genera Neocnus and Acratocnus estimated to only weigh 8–15 kilograms (18–33 lb).

== Ecology ==
Like other sloths megalocnids were probably folivores, with some authors suggesting that based on the anatomy of their limbs, that Neocnus and Acratocnus were likely climbing animals.

== Taxonomy ==
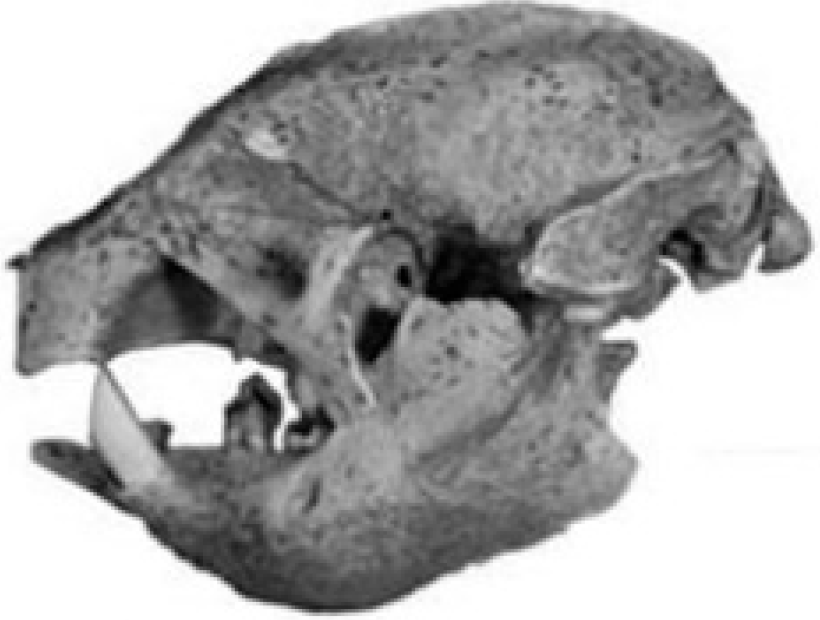
Skull of Acratocnus ye

The taxonomy of Caribbean sloths is in flux, with the number of species present among the Pleistocene-Holocene taxa in question; some species are likely junior synonyms, while the diversity of some genera is probably understated. The mitochondrial DNA study suggests that Acratocnus ye and Parocnus serus are deeply divergent from each other, having split during the Oligocene, suggesting an early radiation within the group. An alternative taxonomy of the group has been proposed including the families Acratocnidae and Parocnidae within a new superfamily, Megalocnoidea.

Based on White and MacPhee (2001): and Vinola-Lopez et al. 2022

- Megalocnus
  - †M. rodens Pleistocene to Holocene, Cuba
- Acratocnus
  - †A. odontrigonus Pleistocene, Puerto Rico
  - †A. ye Pleistocene to Holocene, Hispaniola
  - †A. antillensis Pleistocene to Holocene, Cuba
- Mesocnus
  - †Mesocnus browni Pleistocene to Holocene, Cuba
- Parocnus
  - †Parocnus browni Pleistocene to Holocene, Cuba
  - †Parocnus serus Pleistocene to Holocene, Hispaniola (Junior synonym: Megalocnus zile)
  - †Parocnus dominicanus Pleistocene to Holocene, Hispaniola
- Neocnus
  - †N. gliriformis Pleistocene to Holocene, Cuba
  - †N. major Pleistocene to Holocene, Cuba
  - †N. comes Pleistocene to Holocene, Hispaniola
  - †N. dousman Pleistocene to Holocene, Hispaniola
  - †N. toupiti Pleistocene to Holocene, Hispaniola
- Imagocnus
  - †I. zazae Early Miocene of Cuba

For other sloth taxa of the Caribbean, see Pilosans of the Caribbean.

=== Phylogeny ===
The following sloth family phylogenetic tree is based on collagen and mitochondrial DNA sequence data (see Fig. 4 of Presslee et al., 2019).

- Folivora
  - Megalocnidae
    - Neocnus dousman
    - - Acratocnus ye
      - - Neocnus comes
        - Parocnus serus
  - - - - Scelidotheriidae
        - - Mylodontidae
          - Choloepodidae (two-toed sloths)
      - - - Megalonychidae
          - Bradypodidae (three-toed sloths)
        - - Nothrotheriidae
          - Megatheriidae

== Extinction ==
Sloths in the Caribbean survived about 5,000 years longer than ground sloths on the mainland. On Cuba the latest date for Megalocnus is calibrated 4700 years Before Present (BP). approximately 2700 BC. while dates for Parocnus browni are around 6250 BP (4250 BC). On Hispaniola the dates for some indeterminate sloth specimens are around 5000 BP (3000 BC); these dates roughly coincide with the first settlement of the Caribbean, which suggests that humans were the cause of the extinction. Remains of Caribbean sloths have been found in a number of archaeological sites suggesting that they may have been consumed by the earliest inhabitants of the Caribbean, although evidence of hunting is inconclusive.
