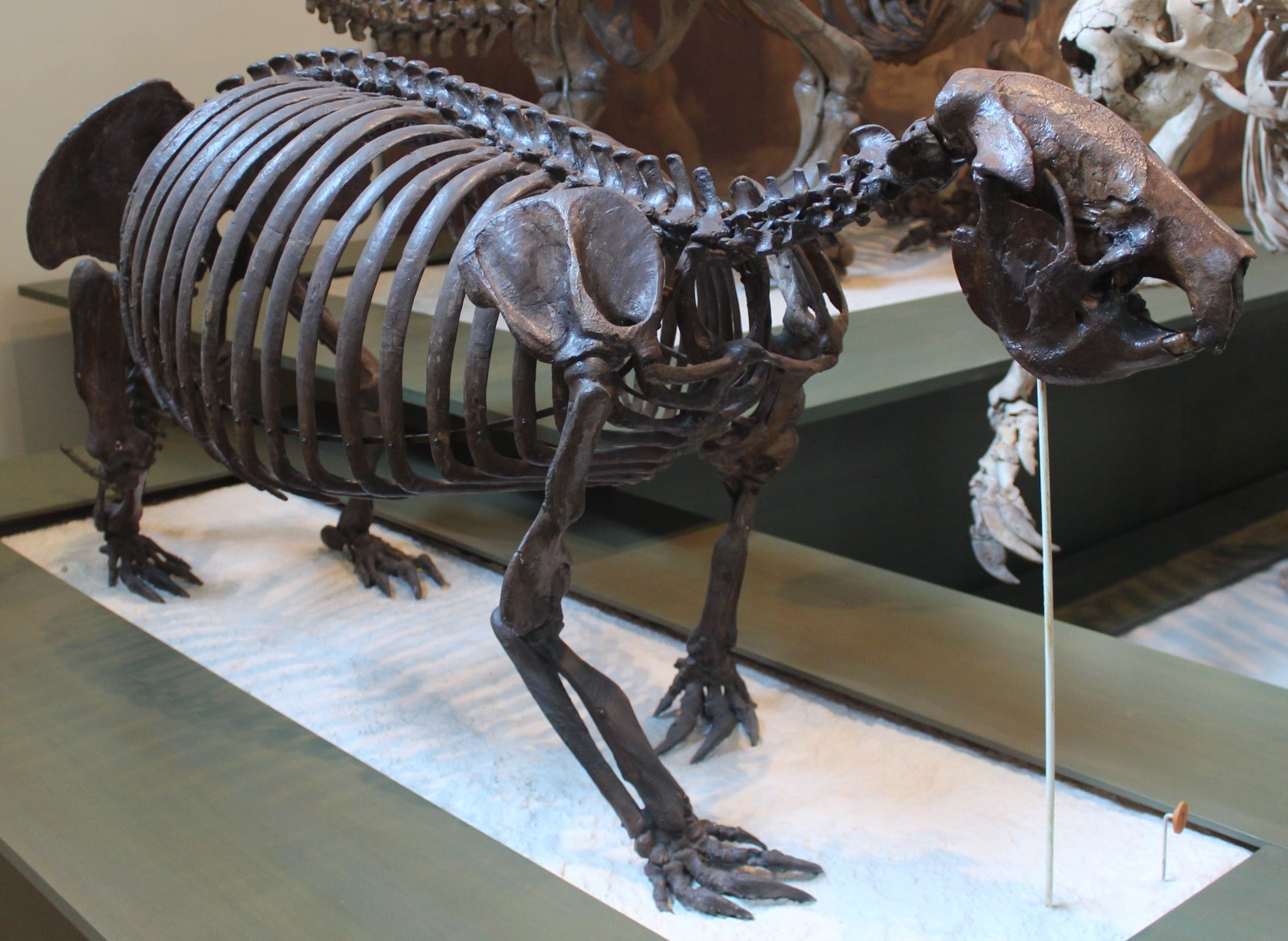
- Megalocnus rodens, collected from Cienfuegos, Cuba. At the AMNH.

Scientific classification
- Kingdom: Animalia
- Phylum: Chordata
- Class: Mammalia
- Order: Pilosa
- Suborder: Folivora
- Family: †Megalocnidae
- Genus: †Megalocnus; Leidy, 1868

Type species
- †Megalocnus rodens Leidy, 1868

= Megalocnus =

Megalocnus Temporal range: 126–5 ka Late Pleistocene to Holocene

Extinct genus of sloths

Megalocnus ("great sloth" in Greek) is a genus of extinct ground sloths that were native to Cuba during the Pleistocene and Holocene epochs. They were among the largest of the Caribbean sloths (Megalocnidae), with individuals estimated to have weighed up to 270 kg (595 lbs) to 200 kg (440 lbs), around the size of a black bear when alive. Its relatives include other megalocnid sloths, such as Acratocnus, Mesocnus, Neocnus and Parocnus. The former species M. zile from Hispaniola is currently thought to be a junior synonym of Parocnus serus.

== Etymology ==
Megalocnus, the generic name, means "great sloth" after the similarities between the holotype's caniniformes with modern sloth's, while rodens means "rodent-like" due to the original misidentification of the fossils as those of a rodent.

== History and taxonomy ==
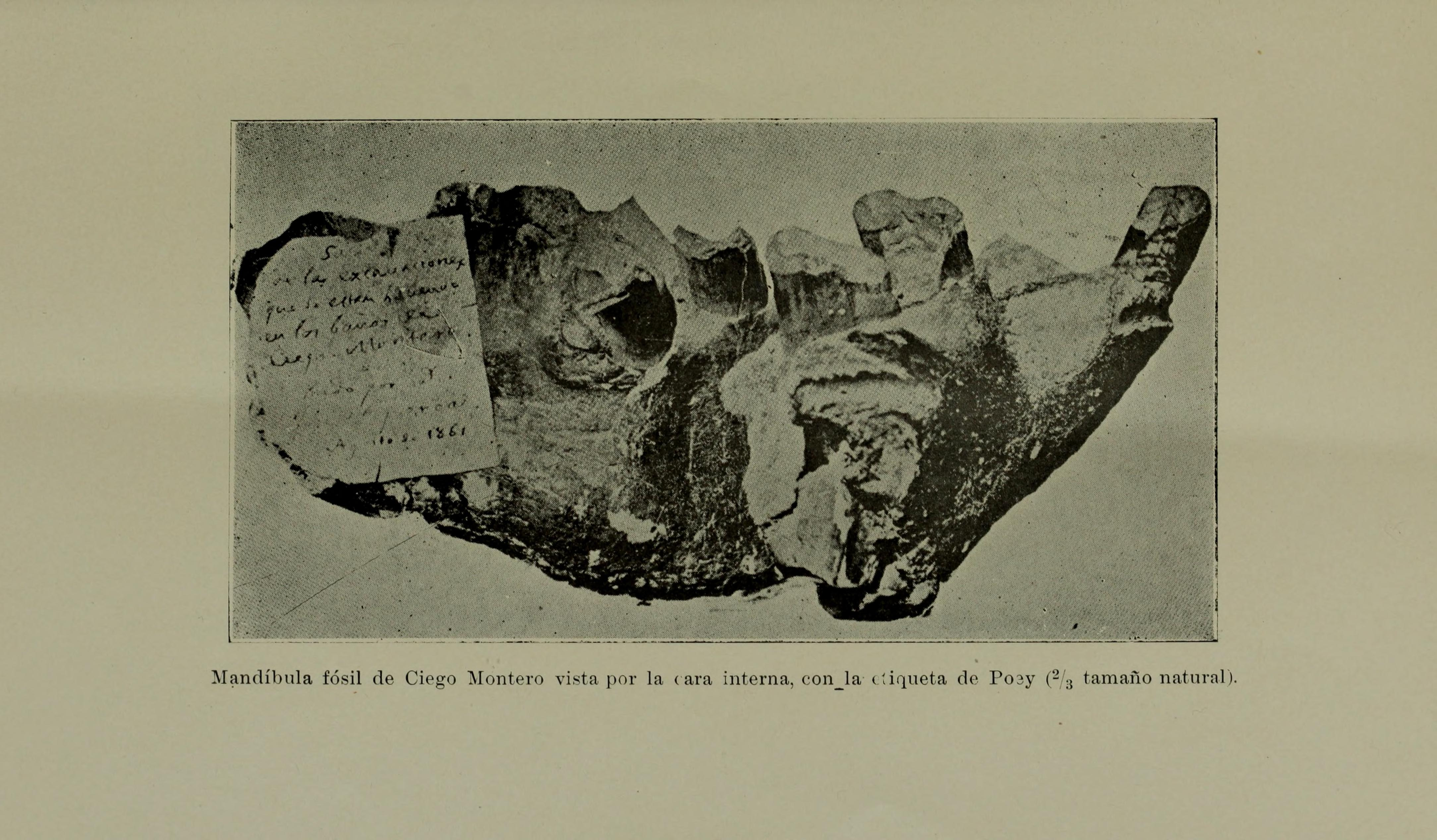
The holotype mandible of Megalocnus rodens

Megalocnus was first described based on an incomplete mandible first described by "D. M. F. de Castro", collected by him in April 1860 in Pleistocene deposits of the thermal springs in Arriete-Ciego Montero in what is now Cienfuegos Province, Cuba; the fossil is held in the Museo Nacional de Ciencias Naturales. It was first identified as the mandible of a large rodent due to the erosion on the canines. The mandible was then given to Prof. Felipe Poey of Havana, who described it briefly in 1861. The fossil was named in 1868 when American paleontologist Joseph Leidy described it as a new species of the large Megalonyx, Megalonyx rodens, though stated that it could be a different genus, which he erected as Megalocnus. A few months later, Parisian naturalist Pomel was sent the fossil by Poey for the 1867 Parisian exposition, who named it as Myomorphus cubensis, subgenus of Megalonyx. Despite this, Megalocnus rodens has priority. In the coming years, more fossil sloths would be named from the Caribbean based on fossils from Puerto Rico and Hispaniola, but it wasn't until the 1910s that a large quantity of fossils of Megalocnus were found. The American Museum of Natural History and the notable Cuban scientist Carlos de la Torre y Huerta collected dozens of fossils of many partial skeletons from 1910 to 1918 at Arriete-Ciego Montero, which resulted in the discovery of enough fossils to mount 3 different skeletons for the AMNH, though only 2 are mounted today at the AMNH, and a skeleton for the Cuban Museum of Natural History. Dr. de la Torre was apparently so fond of his mounted skeleton that he would exhibit it at nearly every exhibition he could. One of the skeletons mounted at the AMNH has since been revealed to bear the right femur of the closely related Parocnus browni. The fossils would be described in detail by both AMNH and Cuban staff over the next 50 years.

In 1979, a scapula and several other Megalocnus fossils were collected by C. A. Woods & co. from Quaternary deposits in Trou Gallery, Ile de la Tortue in the Departement du Nord-Oues, Haiti. These were the first fossils of Megalocnus outside of Cuba described, and were named in 2000 as a new species, Megalocnus zile. However, the species has since been synonymized with Parocnus serus.

== Fossil history ==
Subfossils of M. rodens indicate survival well into the Holocene. The most recent AMS radiocarbon date reported is 4190 BP, calibrated to c. 4700 BP. This is similar to the most recent date reported for a Hispaniolan sloth, 4391 BP, calibrated to c. 5000 BP, for the small and probably semiarboreal Neocnus comes, and some 1,200 years after the earliest known date for human occupation of Cuba, 5140 BP, calibrated to c. 5900 BP.

== Description and paleobiology ==
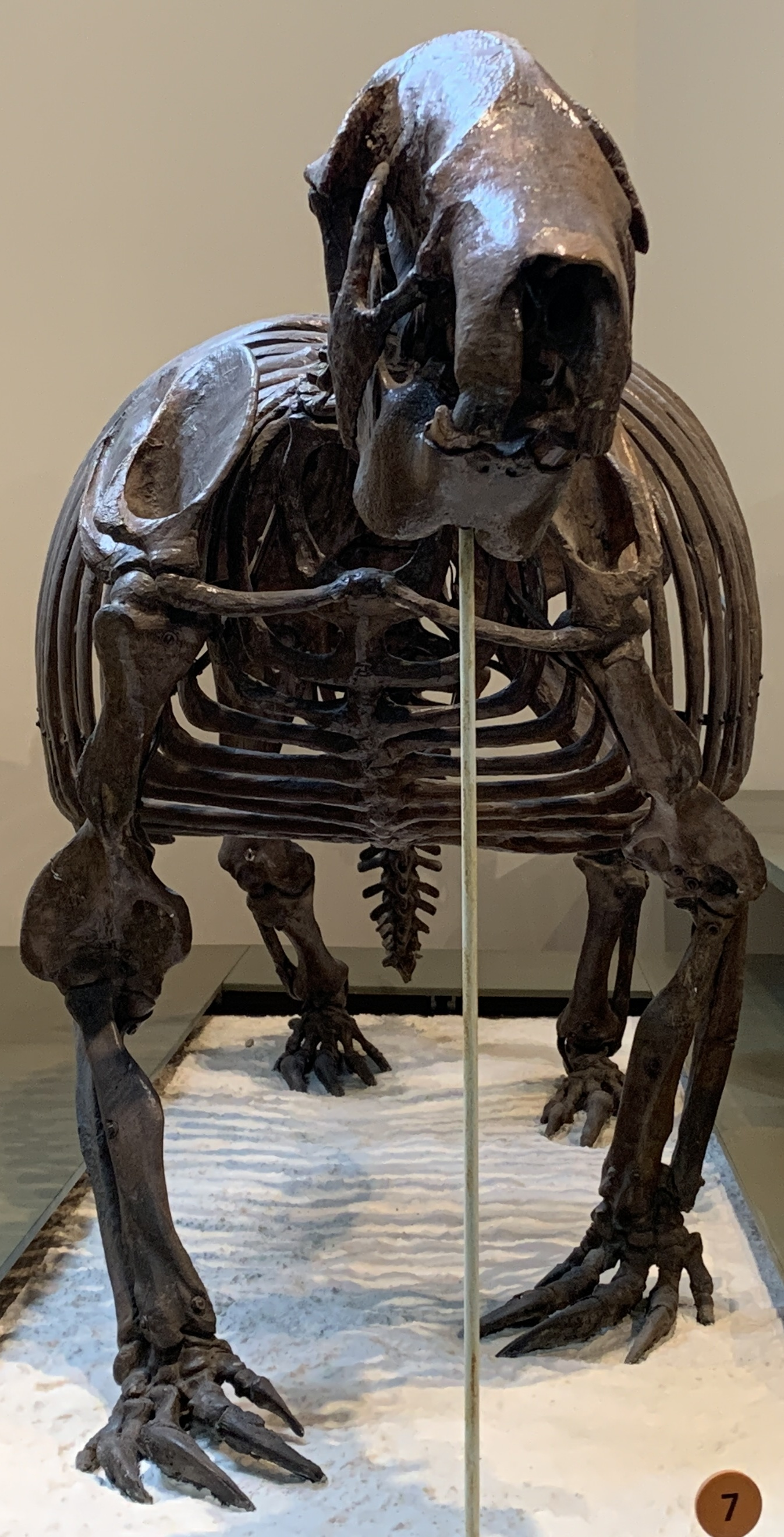
Front view of M. rodens, collected from Cienfuegos, Cuba. At the AMNH.

Due to the large sample size of fossils and the number of well preserved skeletons of Megalocnus, the anatomy of the genus is well known, although the taxon has yet to receive any recent research. Of the Caribbean megalocnids, Megalocnus was the largest and most abundant, with estimates placing it at up to 270 kg (595 lbs) to 200 kg (440 lbs). Megalocnus largely differs from Hapalops in skull and dental structure, especially in the orientation of the enlarged anterior teeth, and has a heavier body with a broader rib cage, more widely flaring ilium, and more elongate ungual phalanges. The larger size, relatively shorter tibia, broader rib cage, flared ilia, and other characters of Megalocnus may suggest more terrestrial habits than those of Hapalops or Acratocnus. The limbs of Megalocnus were low crural, again suggesting that ecologically Megalocnus was a terrestrial, ground feeding fossil sloth rather than a tree climbing one.

Some paleontologists historically have proposed splitting M. rodens into several different species and subspecies, those being Megalocnus rodens rodens, M. r. casimbae, & M. ursulus, though this may just be individual variation. M. r. casimbae was diagnosed by Couto (1967) as; incisiform teeth about two-thirds as wide as those of M. rodens rodens; M2-4 intermediate between those of this species and those of M. ursulus. M. ursulus was diagnosed by; size about two-thirds of that of M. rodens, convexity of mandible beneath and behind last molar much less. Molar teeth less broad. M3 possibly one-sixth wider than long. M. ursulus may just be a young M. rodens rodens, as pointed out by Couto.

== Gallery ==
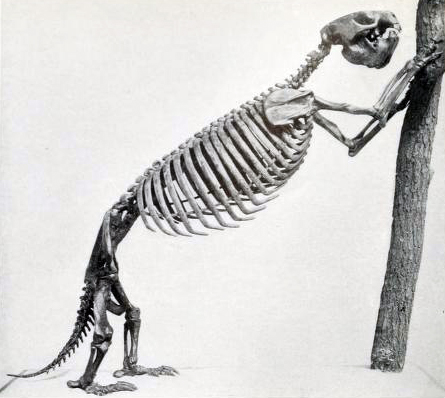
M. rodens at Cuban Academy of Sciences, Havana, early 1900s

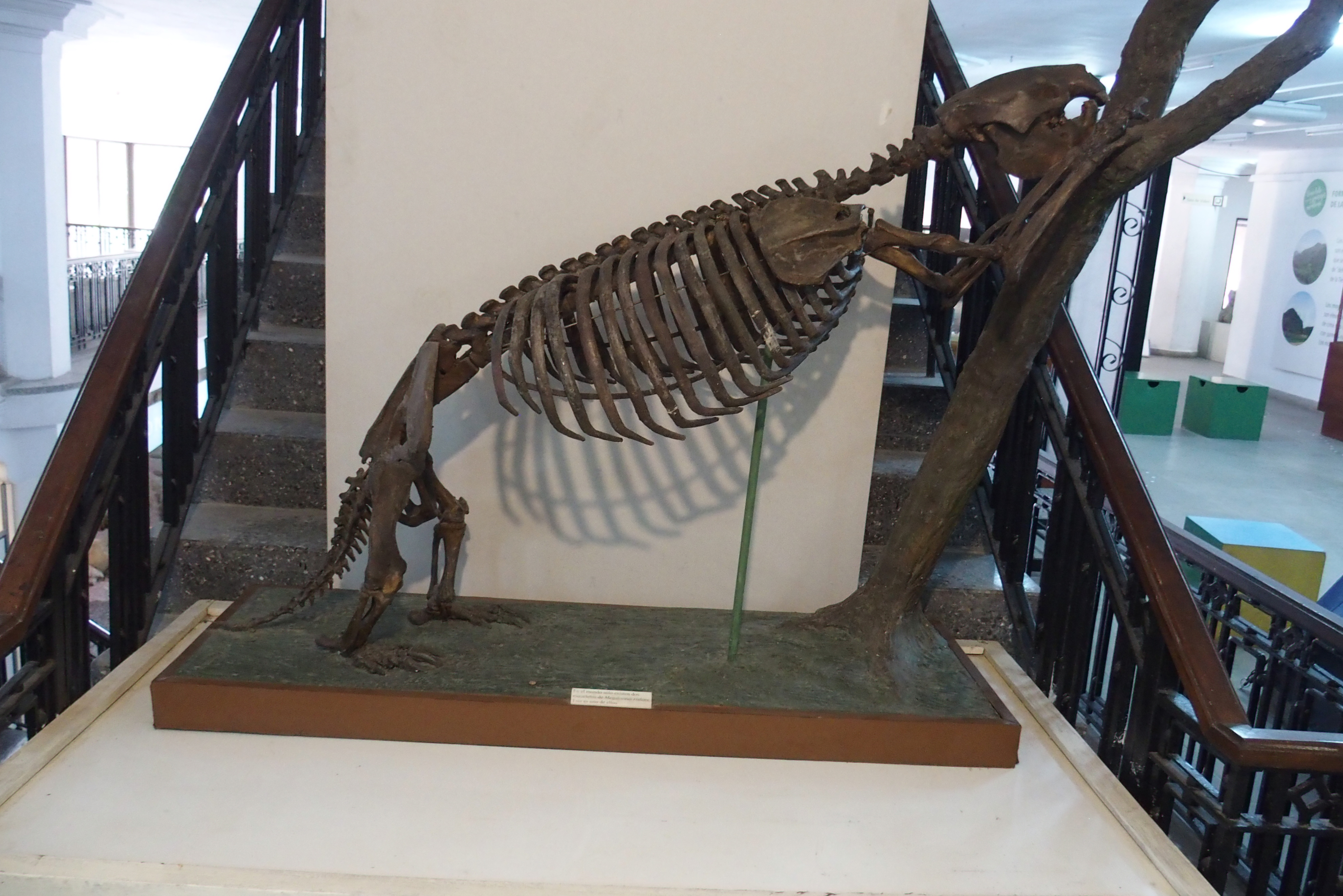
M. rodens at Cuban Museum of Natural History, 2018

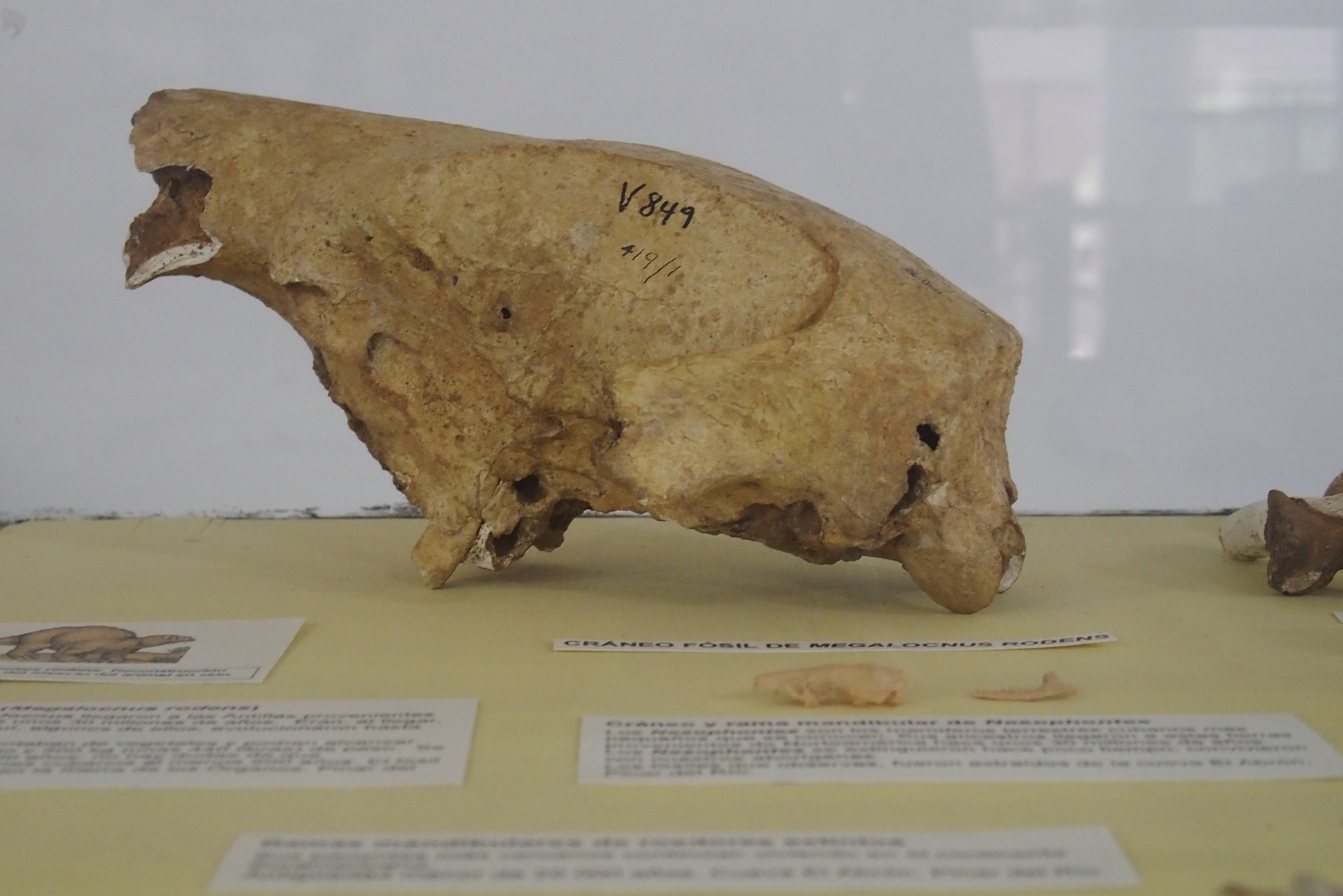
Partial M. rodens skull

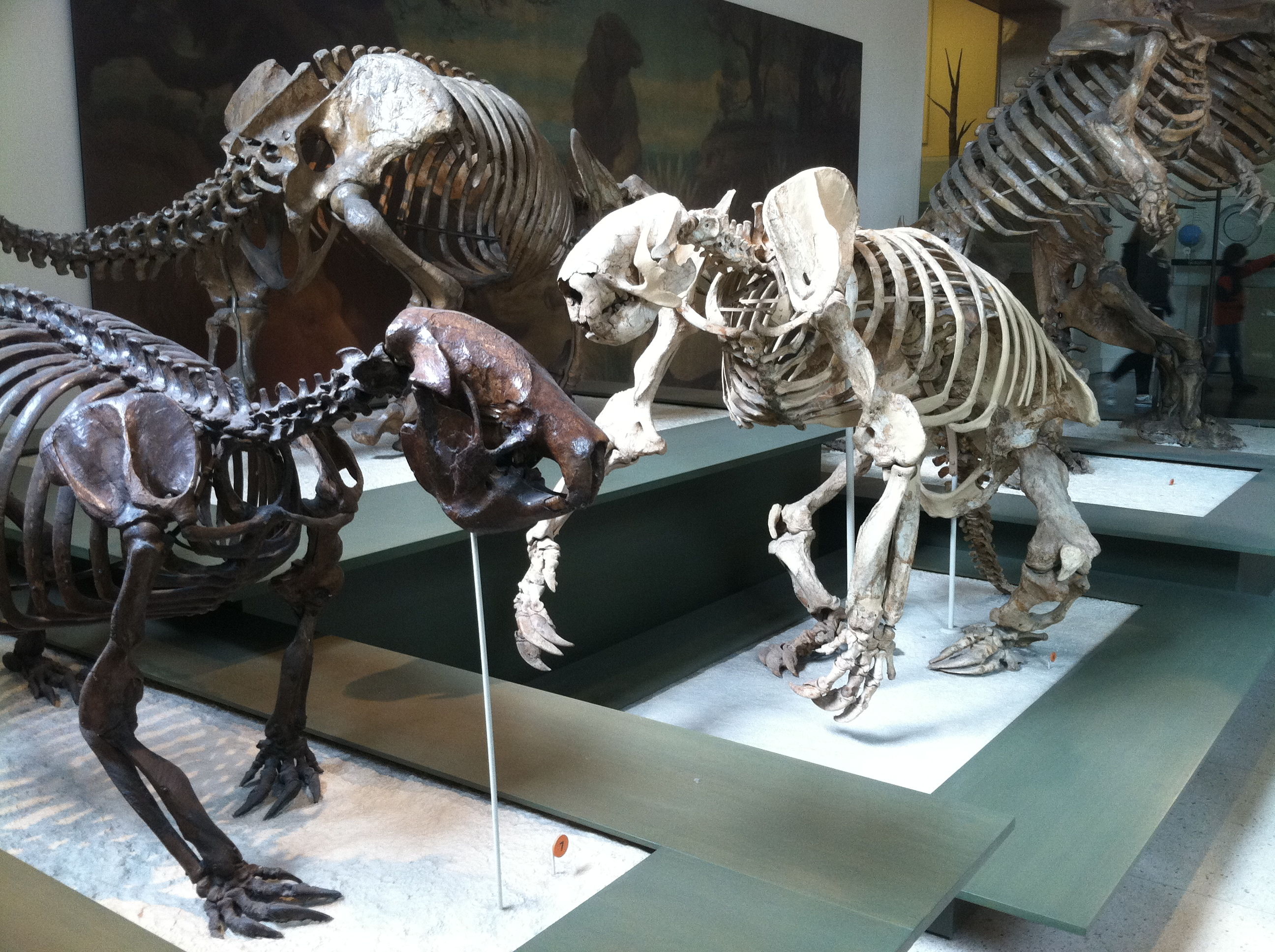
Partial view of AMNH mount in left foreground

== See also ==
- Pilosans of the Caribbean
