= Palatine foramen =

Palatine foramen may refer to:

- Greater palatine foramen
- Lesser palatine foramen
