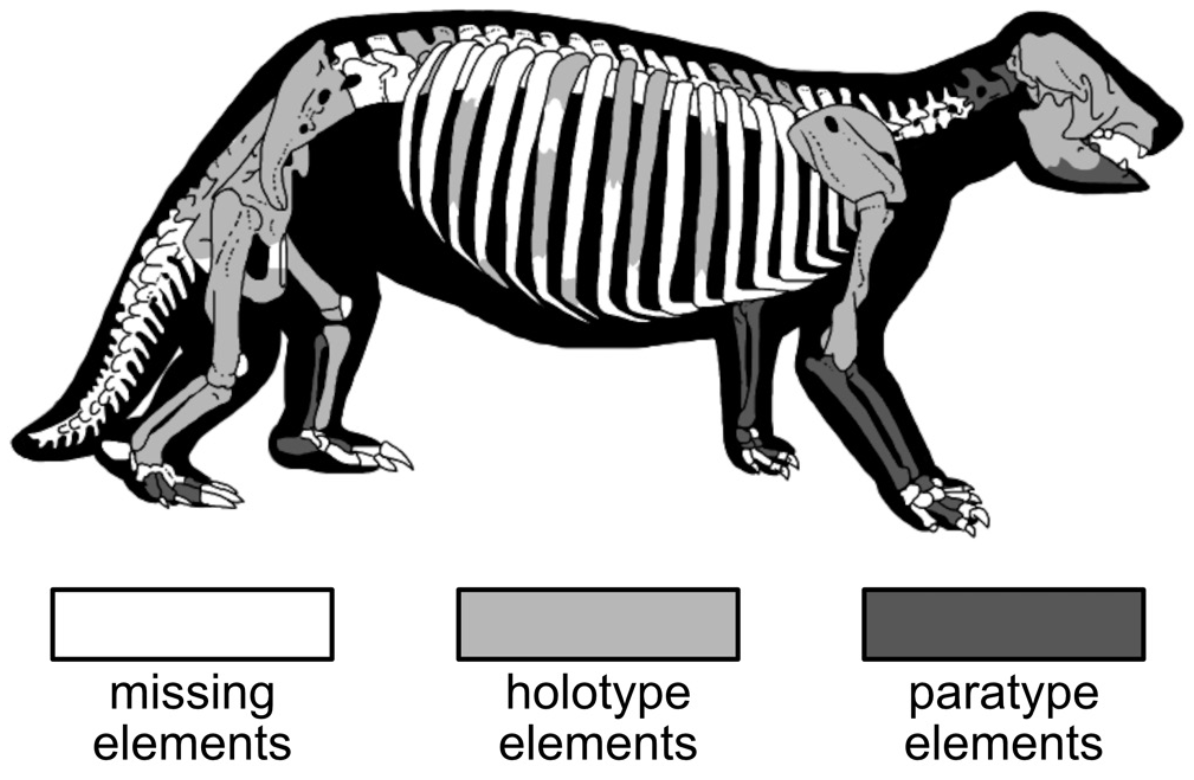
- Skeleton of Parocnus dominicanus

Scientific classification
- Kingdom: Animalia
- Phylum: Chordata
- Class: Mammalia
- Order: Pilosa
- Suborder: Folivora
- Family: †Megalocnidae
- Genus: †Parocnus; Miller 1929

Species
- See text

= Parocnus =

Parocnus Temporal range: Late Pleistocene–Holocene

Extinct genus of ground sloths

Closeup of the skull with the jugal bone missing

Parocnus is an extinct genus of sloth native to Cuba and Hispaniola, belonging to the family Megalocnidae. It was a terrestrial ground sloth, being the second largest Caribbean sloth after Megalocnus, with the body mass of the various species of the genus estimated at around 32–79 kilograms (71–174 lb), comparable to a pig.

== Taxonomy ==
After

- †Parocnus browni Pleistocene to Holocene, Cuba
- †Parocnus serus Pleistocene to Holocene, Hispaniola (synonym Megalocnus zile)
- †Parocnus dominicanus Pleistocene to Holocene, Hispaniola
