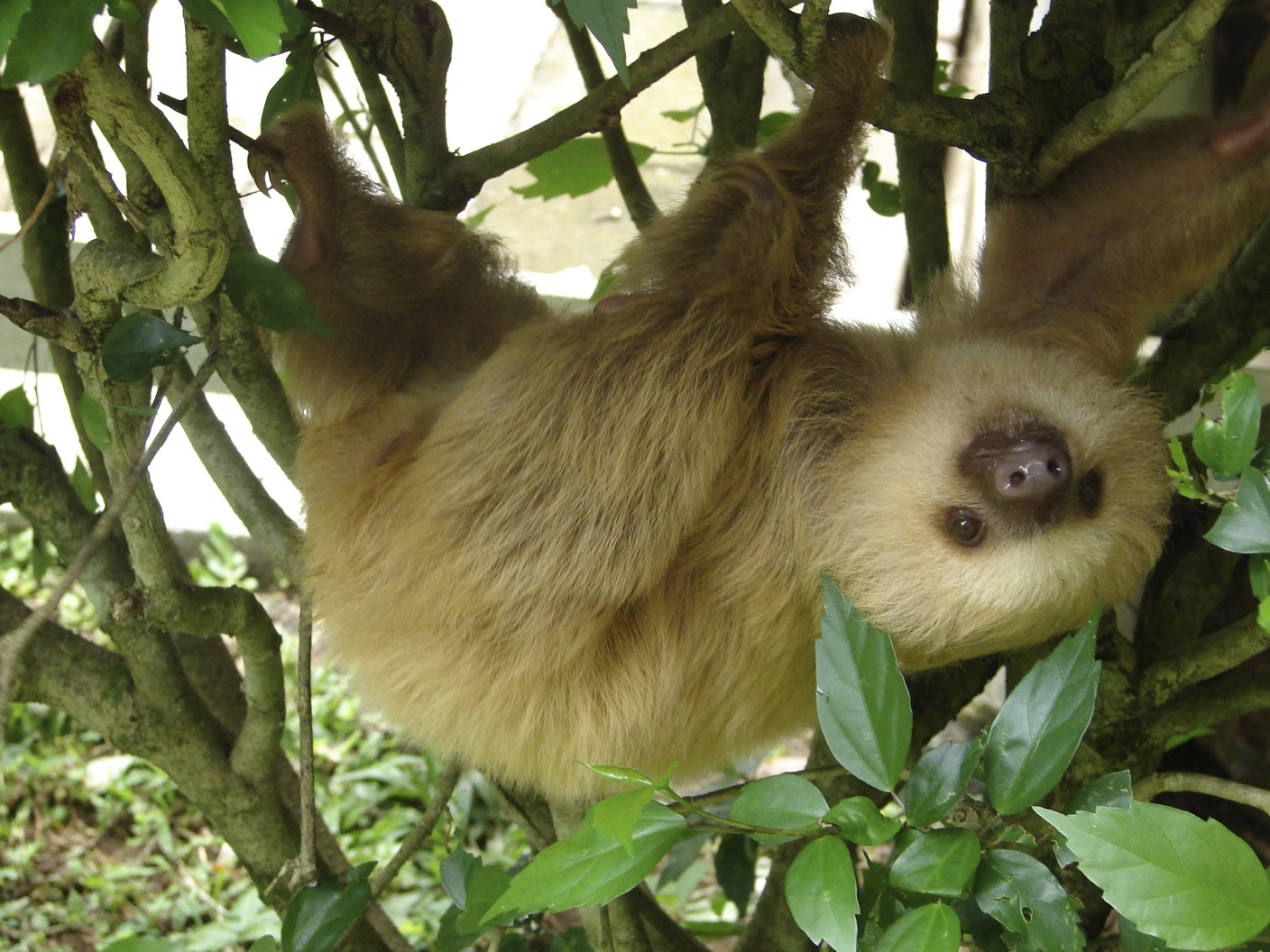
- Hoffmann's two-toed sloth (C. hoffmanni)

Scientific classification
- Kingdom: Animalia
- Phylum: Chordata
- Class: Mammalia
- Order: Pilosa
- Suborder: Folivora
- Superfamily: Mylodontoidea
- Family: Choloepodidae; Gray, 1871
- Genus: Choloepus; Illiger, 1811

Type species
- Bradypus didactylus Linnaeus, 1758

Species
- Choloepus didactylus; Choloepus hoffmanni
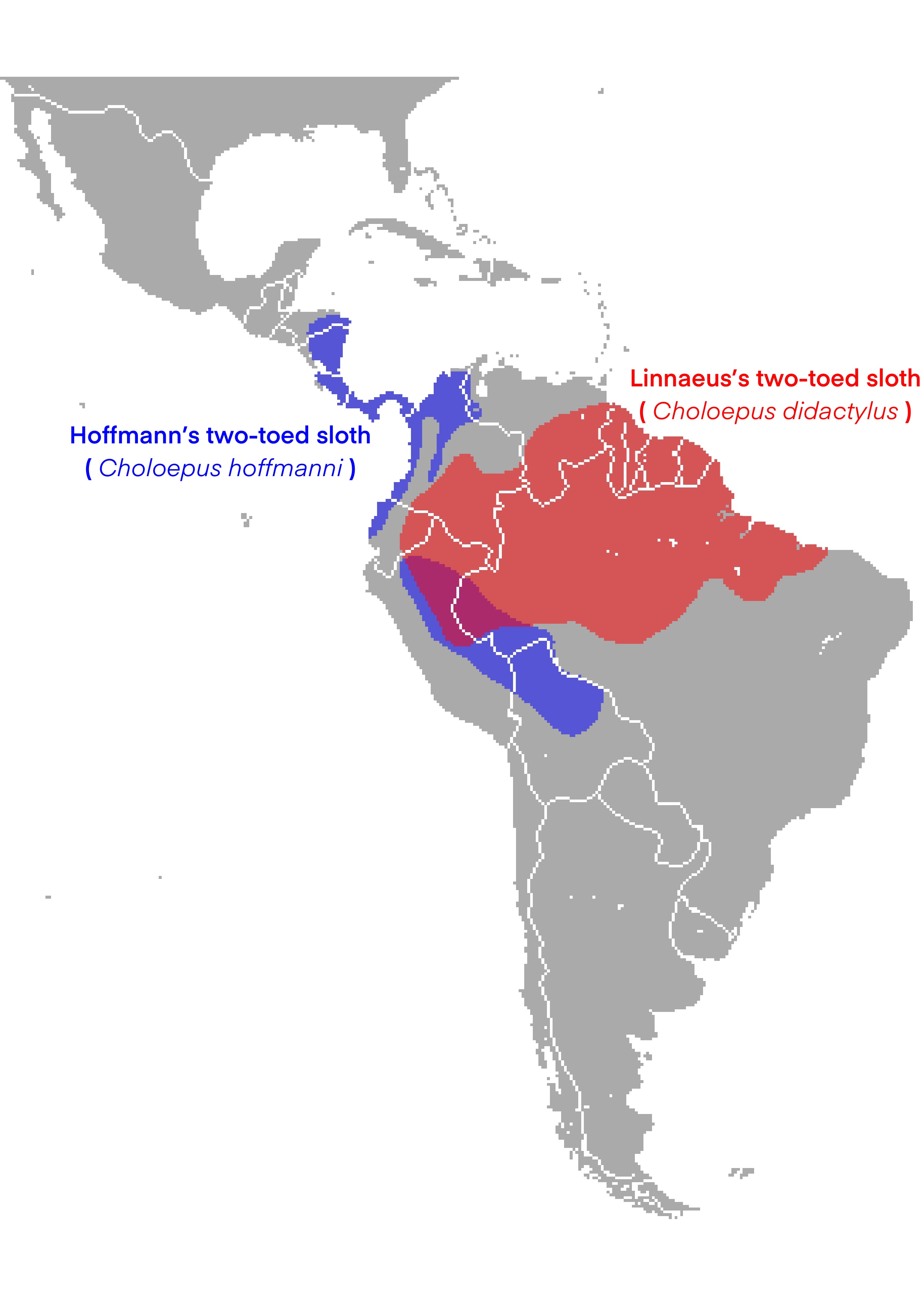

= Two-toed sloth =

Two-toed sloths

Genus of mammals

Choloepus is a genus of xenarthran mammals from Central and South America within the monotypic family Choloepodidae, consisting of two-toed sloths, sometimes also called two-fingered sloths. The two species of Choloepus (which means "lame foot" in Ancient Greek), Linnaeus's two-toed sloth (Choloepus didactylus) and Hoffmann's two-toed sloth (Choloepus hoffmanni), were formerly believed on the basis of morphological studies to be the only surviving members of the sloth family Megalonychidae, but have now been shown by molecular results to be closest to extinct ground sloths of the family Mylodontidae.

== Extant species ==
Genus Choloepus – Illiger, 1811 – two species
| Common name | Scientific name and subspecies | Range | Size and ecology | IUCN status and estimated population |
|---|---|---|---|---|
| Linnaeus's two-toed sloth | Choloepus didactylus (Linnaeus, 1758) | Northern South America, found in Venezuela, the Guyanas, Colombia, Ecuador, Peru, and Brazil north of the Amazon River | Size: Habitat: Diet: | LC |
| Hoffmann's two-toed sloth | Choloepus hoffmanni Peters, 1858 Five subspecies: C. h. hoffmanni, Peters, 1858 – Honduras, Nicaragua, Costa Rica, Panama; C. h. agustinus, Allen, 1913 – Venezuela, western Colombia, northern Ecuador; C. h. capitalis, Allen, 1913 – western Ecuador; C. h. juruanus, Lönnberg, 1942 – Brazil, Bolivia, extreme eastern Peru; C. h. pallescens, Lönnberg, 1928 – Peru | Central America and northwestern South America | Size: Habitat: Diet: | LC |

== Evolution ==
A study of retrovirus and mitochondrial DNA suggests that C. didactylus and C. hoffmani diverged 6 to 7 million years ago. Furthermore, based on cytochrome c oxidase subunit I sequences, a similar divergence date (c. 7 million years ago) between the two populations of C. hofmanni separated by the Andes has been reported. Their ancestors evolved with marine vertebrae, the three toed-sloth and the manatee are the only other mammals with similar vertebrae.

=== Relation to the three-toed sloth ===
Both types of sloth tend to occupy the same forests; in most areas, a particular species of the somewhat smaller and generally slower-moving three-toed sloth (Bradypus) and a single species of the two-toed type will jointly predominate. Although similar in overall appearance, the relationship between the two genera is not close. Recent phylogenetic analyses support analysis of morphological data from the 1970s and 1980s, indicating the two genera are not closely related and adapted to their arboreal lifestyles independently. It was unclear from this work from which ground-dwelling sloth taxa the three-toed sloths evolved. Based on the morphological comparisons, it was thought the two-toed sloths nested phylogenetically within one of the divisions of Caribbean sloths. Though data has been collected on over 33 different species of sloths by analyzing bone structures, many of the relationships between clades on a phylogenetic tree were unclear.

Much of the morphological evidence to support the hypothesis of diphyly has been based on the structure of the inner ear. Most morphological studies have concluded that convergent evolution is the mechanism that resulted in today's two genera of tree sloths. This means that the extant genera evolved analogous traits, such as locomotion methods, size, habitat, and many other traits independently from one another as opposed to from their last common ancestor. This makes tree sloths “one of the most striking examples of convergent evolution known among mammals”.

Recently obtained molecular data from collagen and mitochondrial DNA sequences fall in line with the diphyly (convergent evolution) hypothesis, but have overturned some of the other conclusions obtained from morphology. These investigations consistently place two-toed sloths close to mylodontids and three-toed sloths within Megatherioidea, close to Megalonyx, megatheriids and nothrotheriids. They make the previously recognized family Megalonychidae polyphyletic, with both two-toed sloths and the Caribbean sloths being moved out of that family and away from Megalonyx. Caribbean sloths are placed in a separate, basal branch of the sloth evolutionary tree.

The following sloth family phylogenetic tree is based on collagen and mitochondrial DNA sequence data (see Fig. 4 of Presslee et al., 2019).

- Folivora
  - † Megalocnidae (Caribbean sloths)
  - - Mylodontoidea
      - - † Scelidotheriidae
          - † Scelidodon sp.
          - † Scelidotherium sp.
      - - † Mylodontidae
          - † Lestodon armatus
          - - † Paramylodon harlani
            - - † Glossotherium robustus
              - † Mylodon darwinii
        - Choloepodidae (two-toed sloths)
          - Choloepus didactylus
          - Choloepus hoffmanni
    - Megatherioidea
      - - † Megalonychidae
        - Bradypodidae (three-toed sloths)
      - - † Nothrotheriidae
        - † Megatheriidae

== Characteristics ==
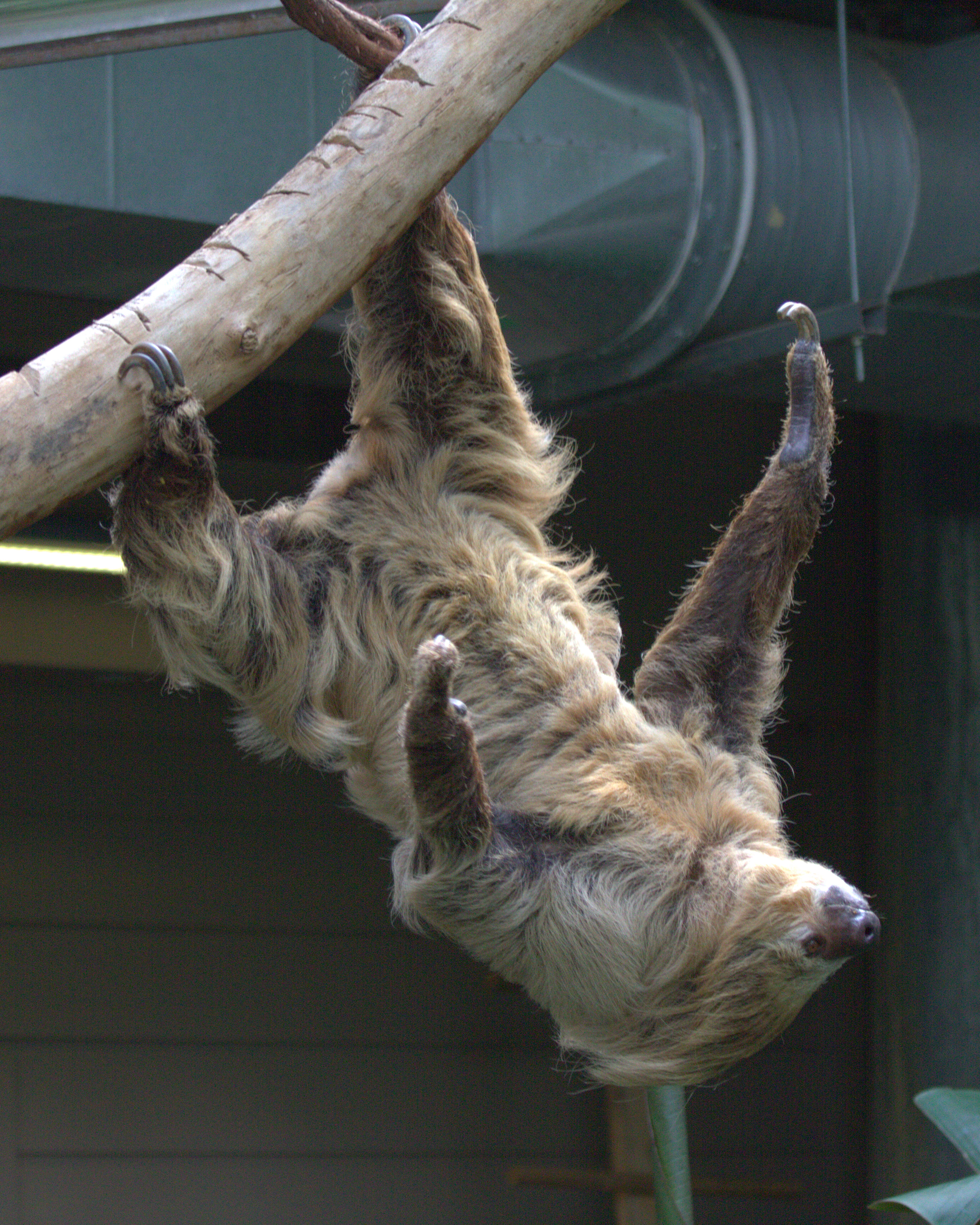
Display of two "fingers" on forelimbs and three toes on hindlimbs

The name "two-toed sloth" was intended to describe an anatomical difference between the genera Choloepus and Bradypus, but does so in a potentially misleading way. Members of Choloepus have two digits on their forelimbs (the thoracic limbs) and three digits on their hindlimbs (the pelvic limbs), while members of Bradypus have three digits on all limbs. Although the term "two-fingered" sloth is arguably less misleading, the shorter "two-toed" is much more widely used. (Note: Given that sloths are regarded as quadrupeds, whether their forelimb digits should be described as fingers is debatable.)

Members of Choloepus are larger than three-toed sloths, having a body length of 58 to 70 centimetres (23 to 28 in), and weighing 4 to 8 kilograms (8.8 to 17.6 lb). Other distinguishing features include a more prominent snout, longer fur, and the absence of a tail.

=== Behaviour ===
Two-toed sloths spend most of their lives hanging upside down from trees. They cannot walk, so they pull hand-over-hand to move around, which is at an extremely slow rate. Almost all of their movement comes from this suspended upside down position, at a higher degree than even three-toed sloths. As a result, they tend to gravitate towards less vertical portions of trees. Being predominantly nocturnal, their fur, which grows greenish algae to blend in, is their main source of protection. Their body temperatures depend at least partially on the ambient temperature; they cannot shiver to keep warm, as other mammals do, because of their unusually low metabolic rates and reduced musculature. Two-toed sloths also differ from three-toed sloths in their climbing behavior, preferring to descend head first.

=== Lifecycle ===
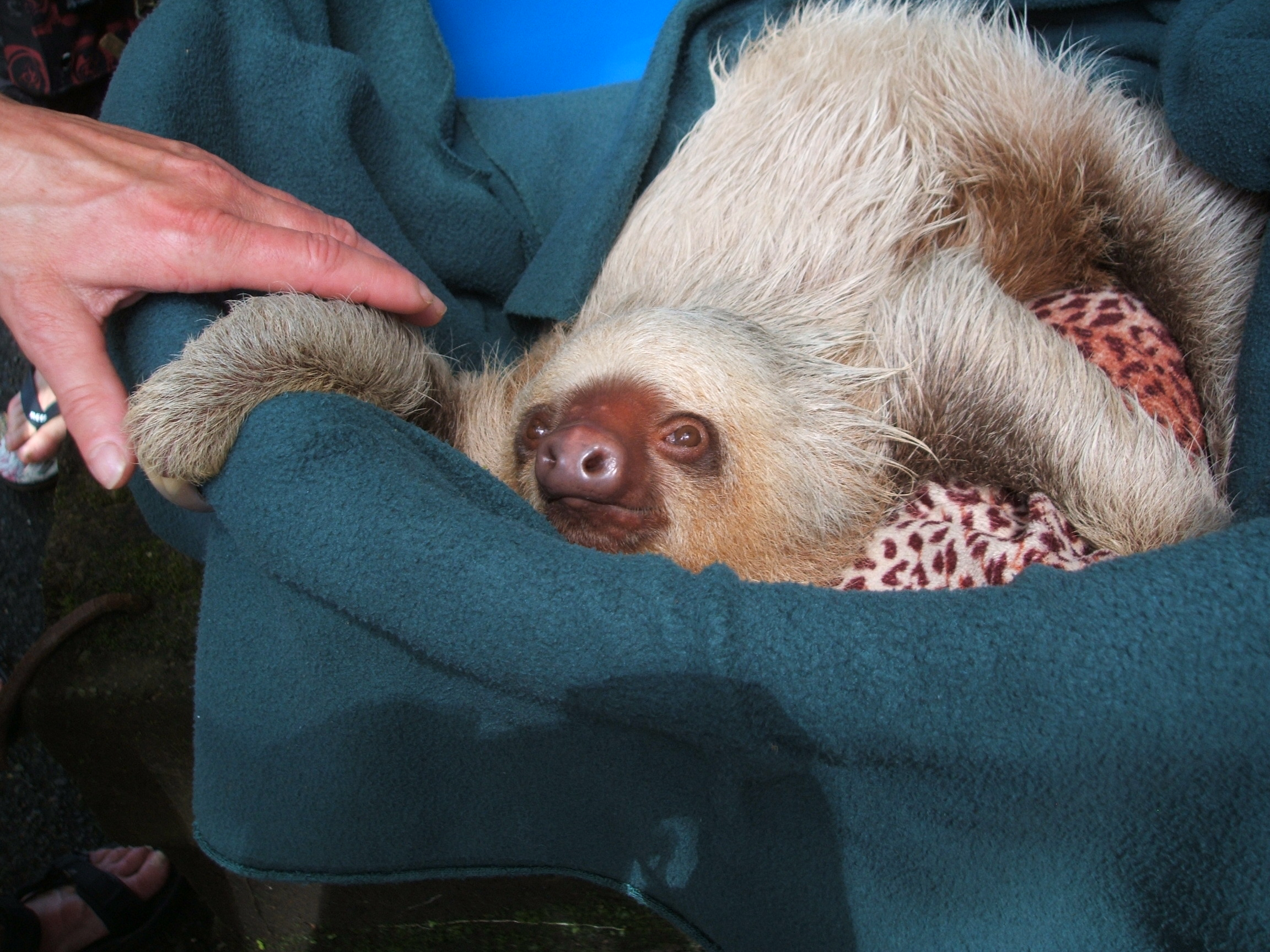
Young C. hoffmanni being raised in a wildlife rescue center in the Osa Peninsula, Costa Rica

Two-toed sloths have a gestation period of six months to a year, depending on the species. Their ovarian cycle lasts around 31 to 33 days, independently of the seasons but dependent on the species. The mother gives birth to a single young, while hanging upside down. The young are born with claws, and are weaned after about a month, although they will remain with the mother for several more months, and do not reach maturity until the age of three years, in the case of females, or four to five years, in the case of males. During natal dispersion, two-toed sloths prefer tropical forests over other types of habitat, often using riparian forest buffers to disperse. Although they also occupy shade-grown cacao plantations, they avoid open pastures.

=== Feeding ===
They eat primarily leaves, but also shoots, fruits, nuts, berries, bark, some native flowers, and even some small vertebrates. In addition, when they cannot find food, they have been known to eat the algae that grow on their fur for nutrients. They have also been observed using mineral licks. They have large, four-chambered stomachs, which help to ferment the large amount of plant matter they eat. Food can take up to a month to digest due to their slow metabolism. Depending on when in the excretion cycle a sloth is weighed, urine and feces may account for up to 30% of the animal's body weight. They get most of their fluids from water in the leaves that they eat but sloths have also been observed drinking directly from rivers.

=== Dentition and skeleton ===
Two-toed sloths have a reduced, ever growing dentition, with no incisors or true canines, which overall lacks homology with the dental formula of other mammals. Their first tooth is very canine-like in shape and is referred to as a caniniform. It is used for tearing small chunks off of their food, as well as for defense against predators. It is separated from the other teeth, or molariforms, by a diastema. The molariforms are used specifically for grinding and are mortar and pestle-like in appearance and function. Thus, they can grind food for easier digestibility, which takes the majority of their energy. The dental formula of two-toed sloths is: 45 (unau)

Two-toed sloths are unusual among mammals in possessing as few as five cervical vertebrae, which may be due to mutations in the homeotic genes. All other mammals have seven cervical vertebrae, other than the three-toed sloth and the manatee.

=== Musculature ===
Two-toed sloths generally have similar musculature to that of other mammals. This includes their zygomaticus muscles, their superficial masseter, their deep masseter, and their medial and lateral pterygoids. Additionally, a specific section of their anterior temporalis is arranged vertically, to allow them to sharpen their caniniform teeth. They tend to have stronger flexor muscles in their fore- and hindlimbs, as well as their shoulders.
