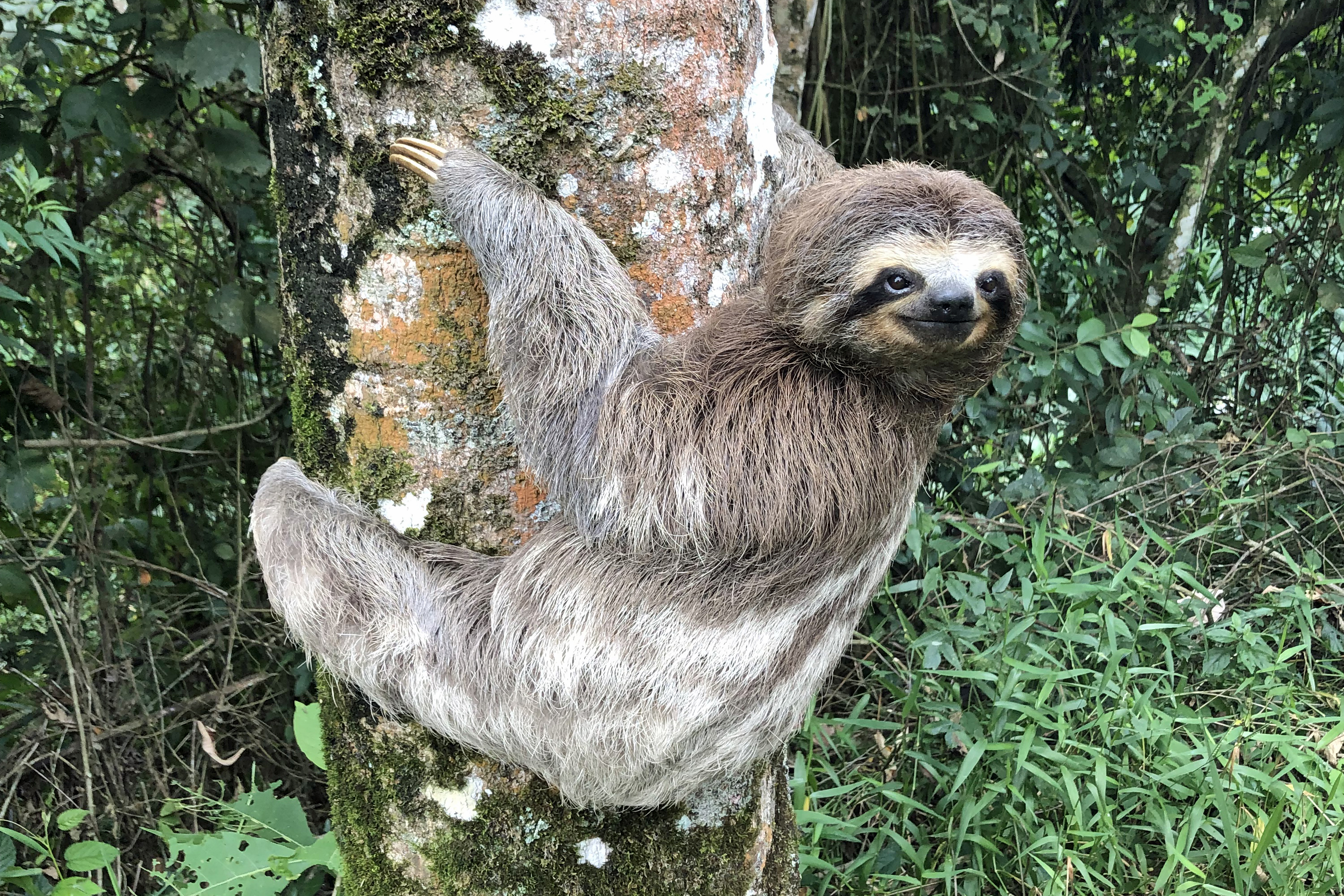
- Bradypus variegatus, a three-toed sloth
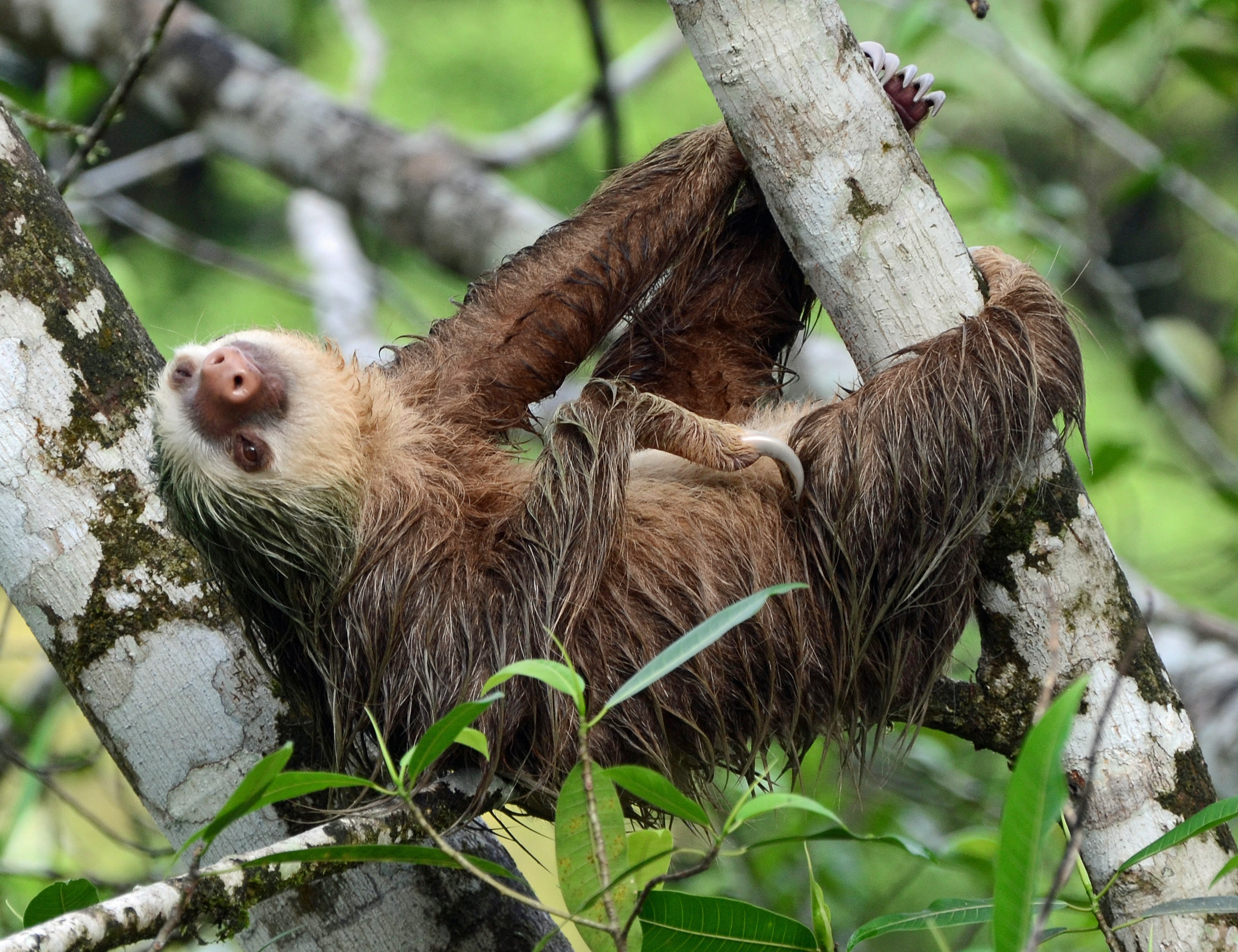
- Choloepus hoffmanni, a two-toed sloth

Scientific classification
- Kingdom: Animalia
- Phylum: Chordata
- Class: Mammalia
- Superorder: Xenarthra
- Order: Pilosa
- Suborder: Folivora; Delsuc, Catzeflis, Stanhope, and Douzery, 2001

Families
- †Megalocnidae; Megatherioidea; †Hiskatherium; †Similhapalops; Bradypodidae; †Megalonychidae; †Megatheria; †Megatheriidae; †Nothrotheriidae; Mylodontoidea; Choloepodidae; †Mylodontidae; †Scelidotheriidae
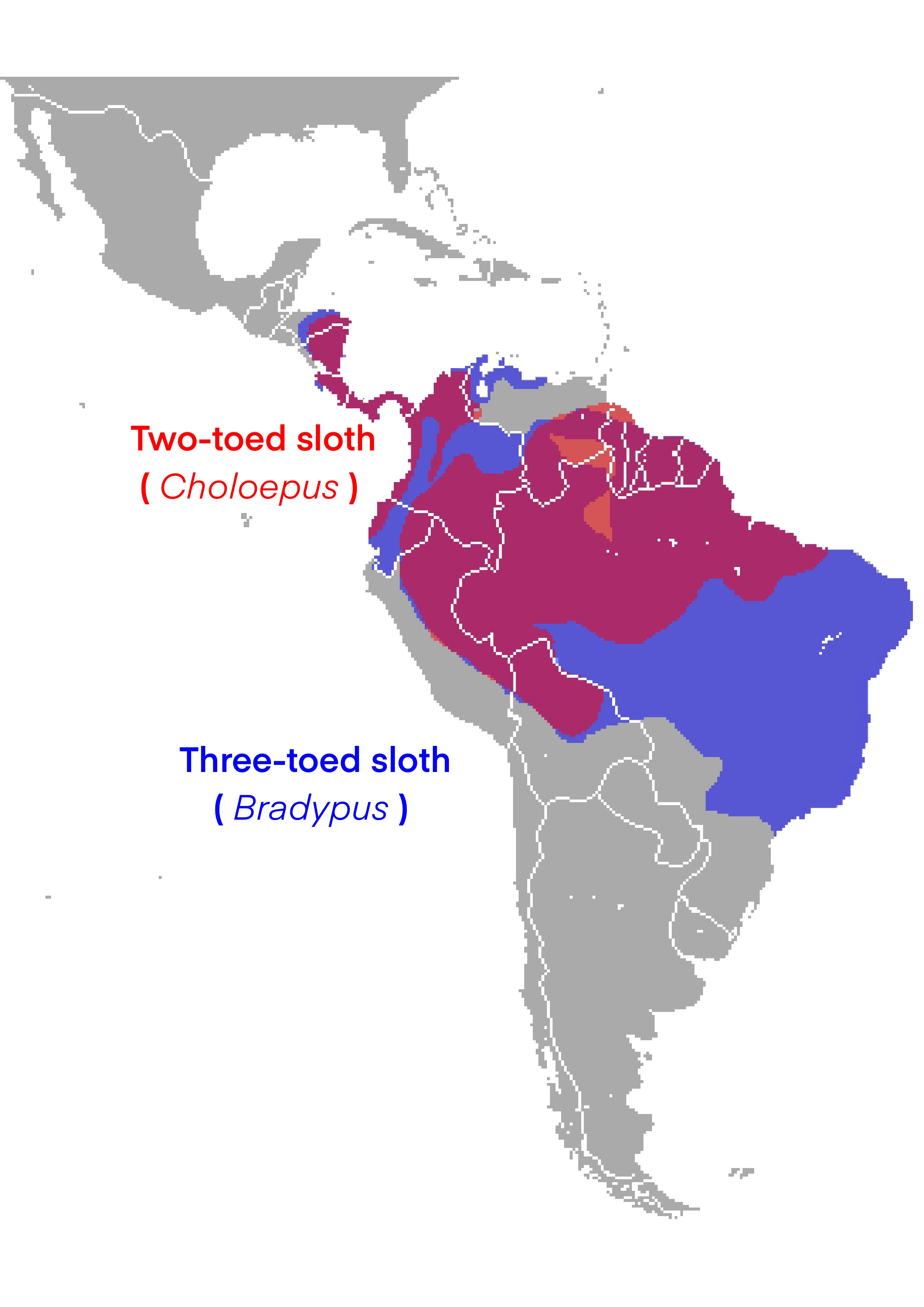
- Red: two-toed sloth, blue: three-toed sloth, purple: both two-toed sloth and three-toed sloth

Synonyms
- Tardigrada Latham & Davies, 1795; Phyllophaga Owen, 1842

= Sloth =

Sloths Temporal range: Early Oligocene to Recent

Group of tree dwelling mammals noted for slowness

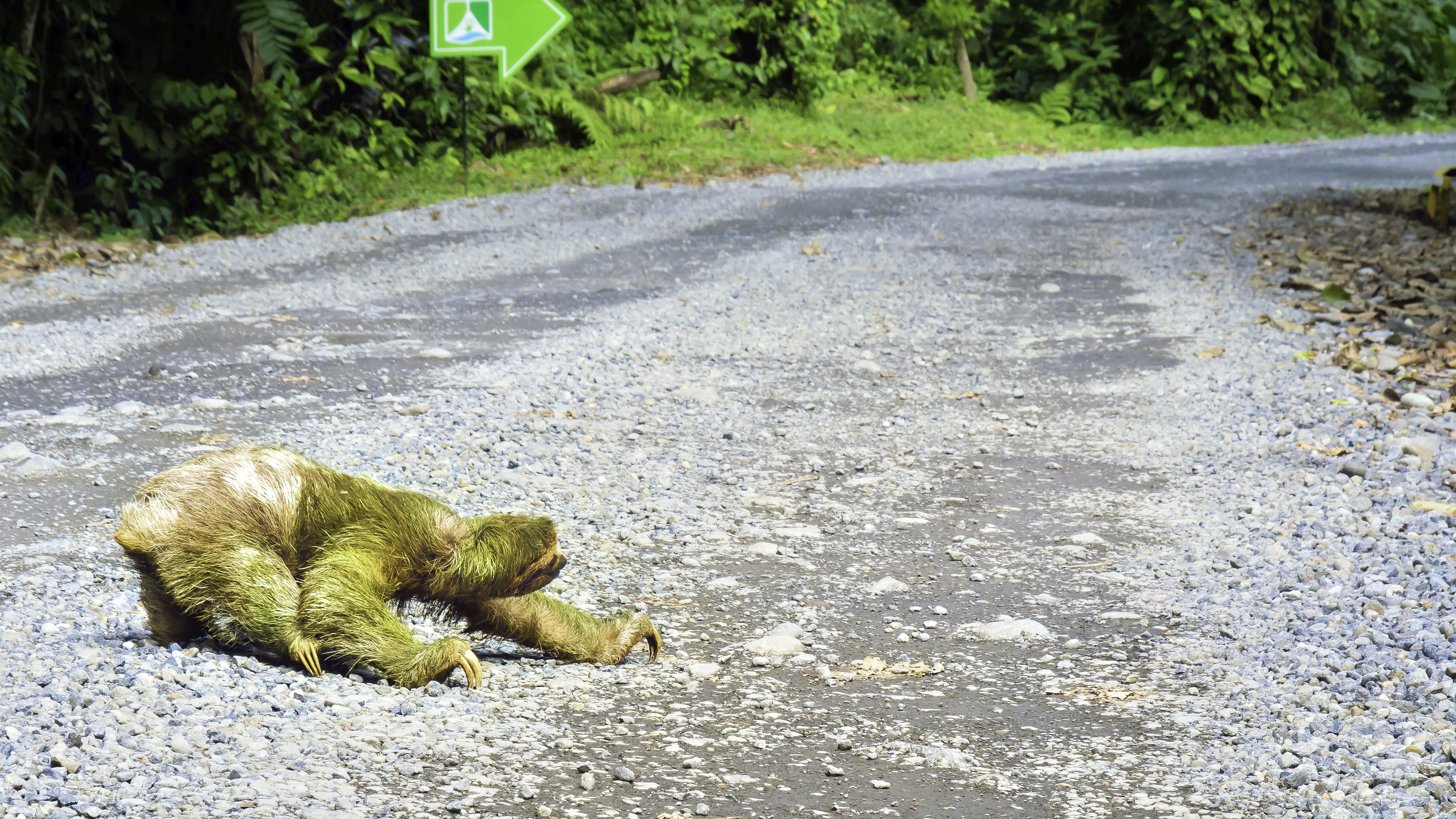
Three-toed sloth crossing a road in Costa Rica

Sloths are a Neotropical group of xenarthran mammals constituting the suborder Folivora, including the extant arboreal tree sloths and extinct terrestrial ground sloths. Noted for their slowness of movement, tree sloths spend most of their lives hanging upside down in the trees of the tropical rainforests of South America and Central America. Sloths are considered to be most closely related to anteaters, together making up the xenarthran order Pilosa.

There are seven extant sloth species in two genera – Bradypus (three-toed sloths) and Choloepus (two-toed sloths). Despite this traditional naming, all sloths have three toes on each rear limb – although two-toed sloths have only two digits on each forelimb. The two groups of sloths are from different, distantly related families, and are thought to have evolved their morphology via parallel evolution from terrestrial ancestors. Besides the extant species, many species of ground sloths ranging up to the size of elephants (like Megatherium) inhabited both North and South America during the Pleistocene Epoch. However, they became extinct during the Quaternary extinction event around 12,000 years ago, along with most large animals across the Americas. The extinction correlates in time with the arrival of humans, but climate change has also been suggested to have contributed. Members of an endemic radiation of Caribbean sloths also formerly lived in the Greater Antilles but became extinct after humans settled the archipelago in the mid-Holocene, around 6,000 years ago.

Sloths are so named because of their very low metabolism and deliberate movements. Sloth, related to slow, literally means "laziness", and their common names in several other languages (e.g. German: Faultier, French: paresseux, Spanish: perezoso, Portuguese: preguiça, Romanian: leneș, Finnish: laiskiainen) also mean "lazy" or similar. Their slowness permits their low-energy diet of leaves and avoids detection by predatory hawks and cats that hunt by sight. Sloths are almost helpless on the ground but are able to swim. The shaggy coat has grooved hair that is host to symbiotic green algae which camouflage sloths in the trees and provide it nutrients. The algae also nourish sloth moths, some species of which exist solely on sloths.

== Taxonomy and evolution ==
Sloths belong to the superorder Xenarthra, a group of placental mammals believed to have evolved in the continent of South America around 60 million years ago. One study found that xenarthrans broke off from other placental mammals around 100 million years ago. Anteaters and armadillos are also included among Xenarthra. The earliest xenarthrans were arboreal herbivores with sturdy vertebral columns, fused pelvises, stubby teeth, and small brains. Sloths are in the taxonomic suborder Folivora of the order Pilosa. These names are from the Latin 'leaf eater' and 'hairy', respectively. Pilosa is one of the smallest of the orders of the mammal class; its only other suborder contains the anteaters.

The Folivora are divided into at least eight families, only two of which have living species; the remainder are entirely extinct (†):

- †Megalocnidae: the Greater Antilles sloths, a basal group that arose about 32 million years ago and became extinct about 5,000 years ago.
- Superfamily Megatherioidea
  - Bradypodidae, the three-toed sloths, contains four extant species:
    - The brown-throated three-toed sloth (Bradypus variegatus) is the most common of the extant species of sloth, which inhabits the Neotropical realm in the forests of South and Central America.
    - The pale-throated three-toed sloth (Bradypus tridactylus), which inhabits tropical rainforests in northern South America. It is similar in appearance to, and often confused with, the brown-throated three-toed sloth, which has a much wider distribution. Genetic evidence indicates the two species diverged around six million years ago.
    - The maned three-toed sloth (Bradypus torquatus), now found only in the Atlantic Forest of southeastern Brazil.
    - The critically endangered pygmy three-toed sloth (Bradypus pygmaeus) which is endemic to the small island of Isla Escudo de Veraguas off the coast of Panama.
  - †Megalonychidae: ground sloths that existed for about 35 million years and went extinct about 11,000 years ago. This group was formerly thought to include both the two-toed sloths and the extinct Greater Antilles sloths.
  - †Megatheriidae: ground sloths that existed for about 23 million years and went extinct about 11,000 years ago; this family included the largest sloths.
  - †Nothrotheriidae: ground sloths that lived from approximately 11.6 million to 11,000 years ago. As well as ground sloths, this family included Thalassocnus, a genus of either semiaquatic or fully aquatic sloths.
- Superfamily Mylodontoidea
  - Choloepodidae, the two-toed sloths, contains two extant species:
    - Linnaeus's two-toed sloth (Choloepus didactylus) found in Venezuela, the Guianas, Colombia, Ecuador, Peru, and Brazil north of the Amazon River.
    - Hoffmann's two-toed sloth (Choloepus hoffmanni) which inhabits tropical forests. It has two separate ranges, split by the Andes. One population is found from eastern Honduras in the north to western Ecuador in the south, and the other in eastern Peru, western Brazil, and northern Bolivia.
  - †Mylodontidae: ground sloths that existed for about 23 million years and went extinct about 11,000 years ago.
  - †Scelidotheriidae: collagen sequence data indicates this group is more distant from Mylodon than Choloepus is, so it has been elevated back to full family status.

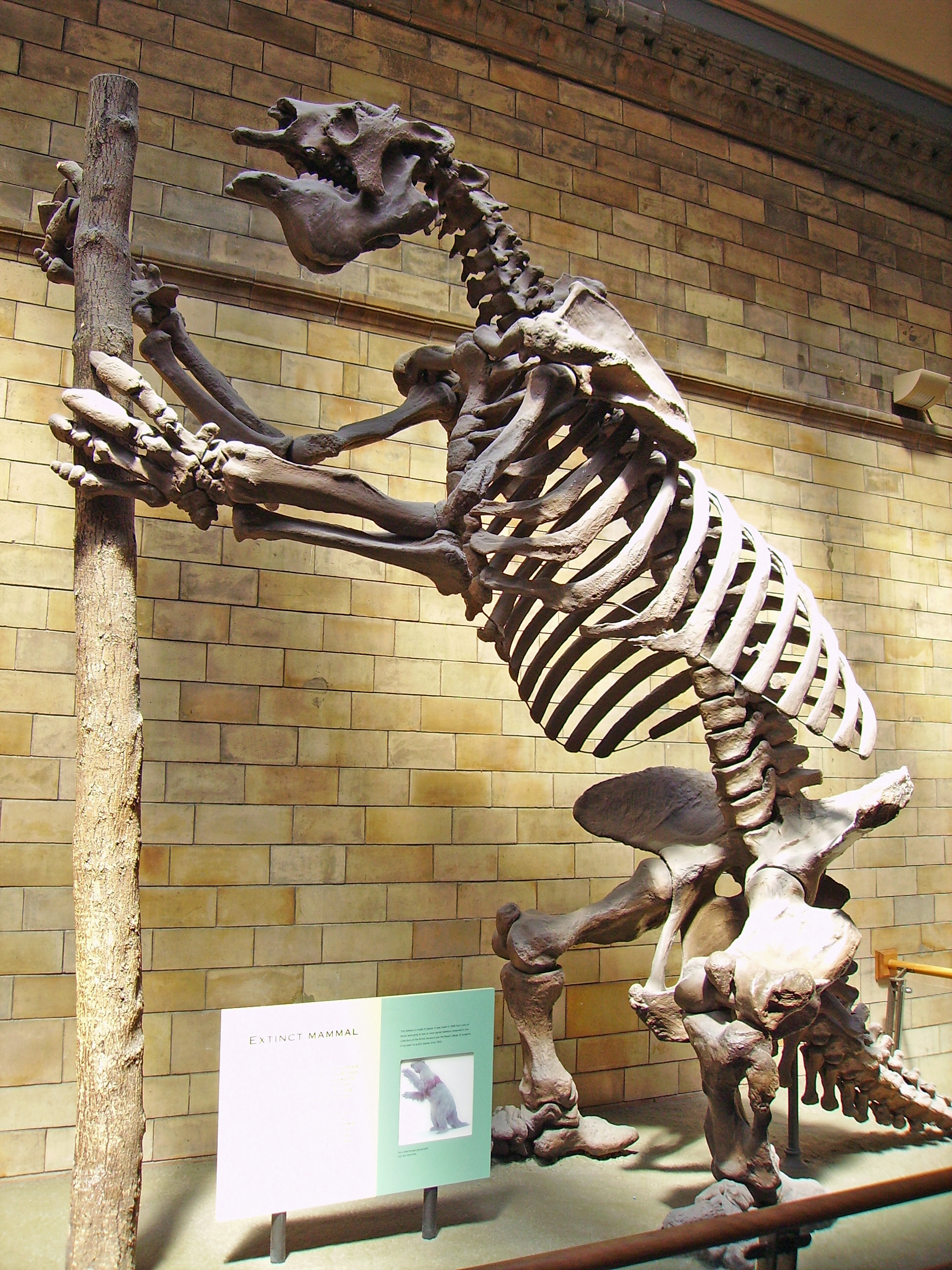
Megatherium americanum (Megatheriidae, London)

=== Evolution ===
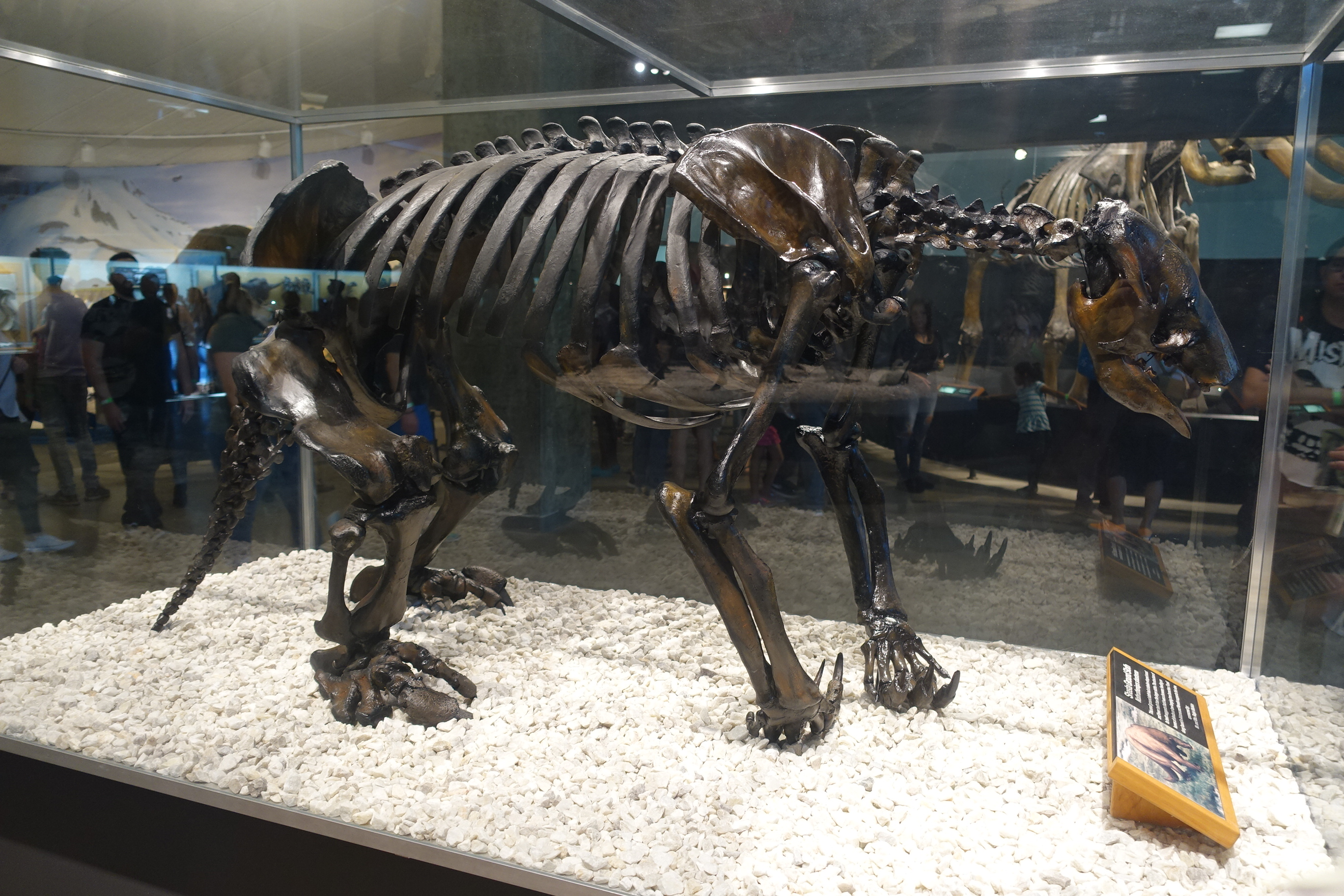
Nothrotheriops shastensis (Nothrotheriidae, La Brea)

The common ancestor of the two existing sloth genera dates to about 28 million years ago, with similarities between the two- and three-toed sloths an example of convergent evolution to an arboreal lifestyle, "one of the most striking examples of convergent evolution known among mammals". The ancient Xenarthra included a significantly greater variety of species, with a wider distribution, than those of today. Ancient sloths were mostly terrestrial, and some reached sizes that rival those of elephants, as was the case for Megatherium.

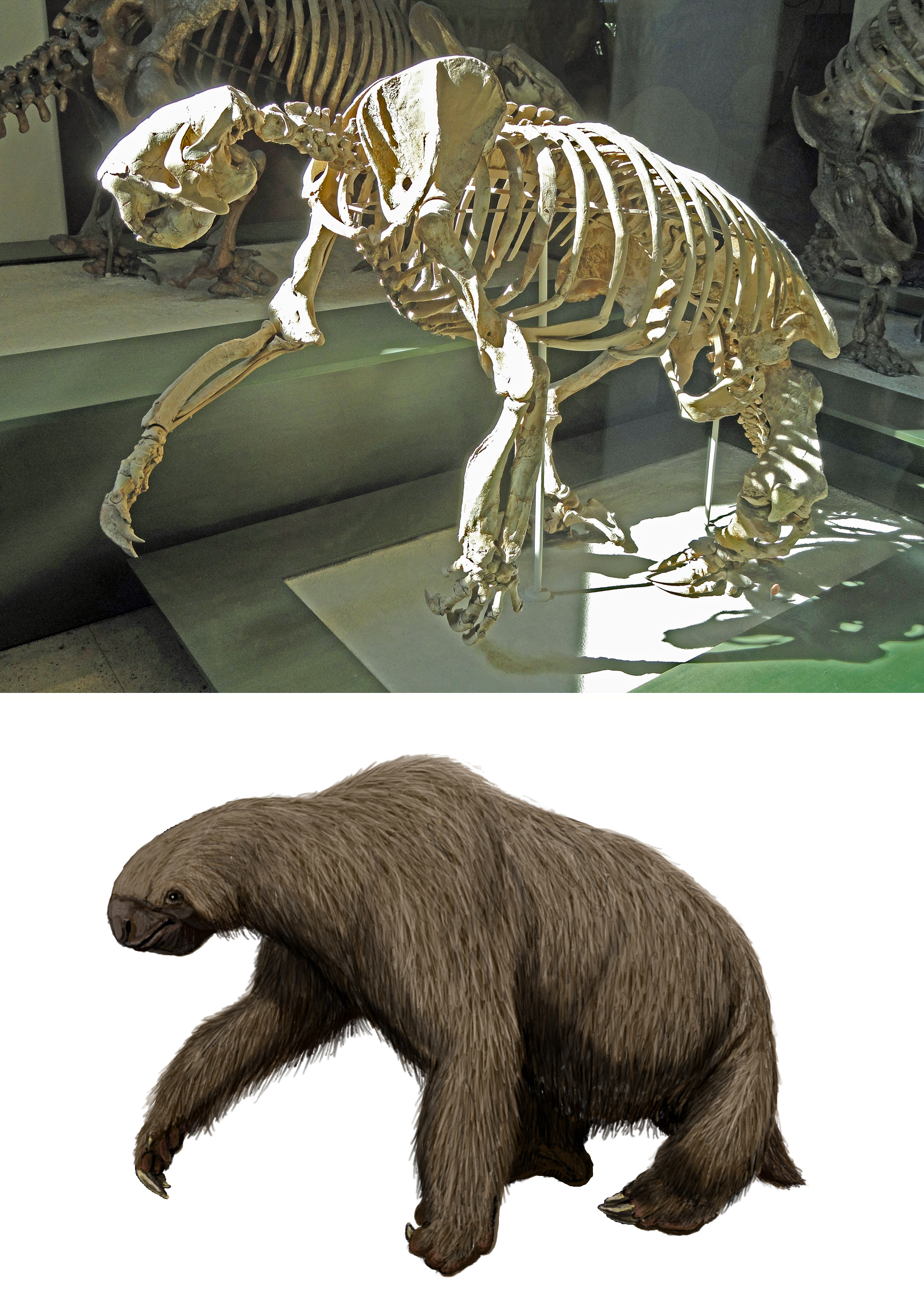
Megalonyx wheatleyi (Megalonychidae) fossil (AMNH) and restoration

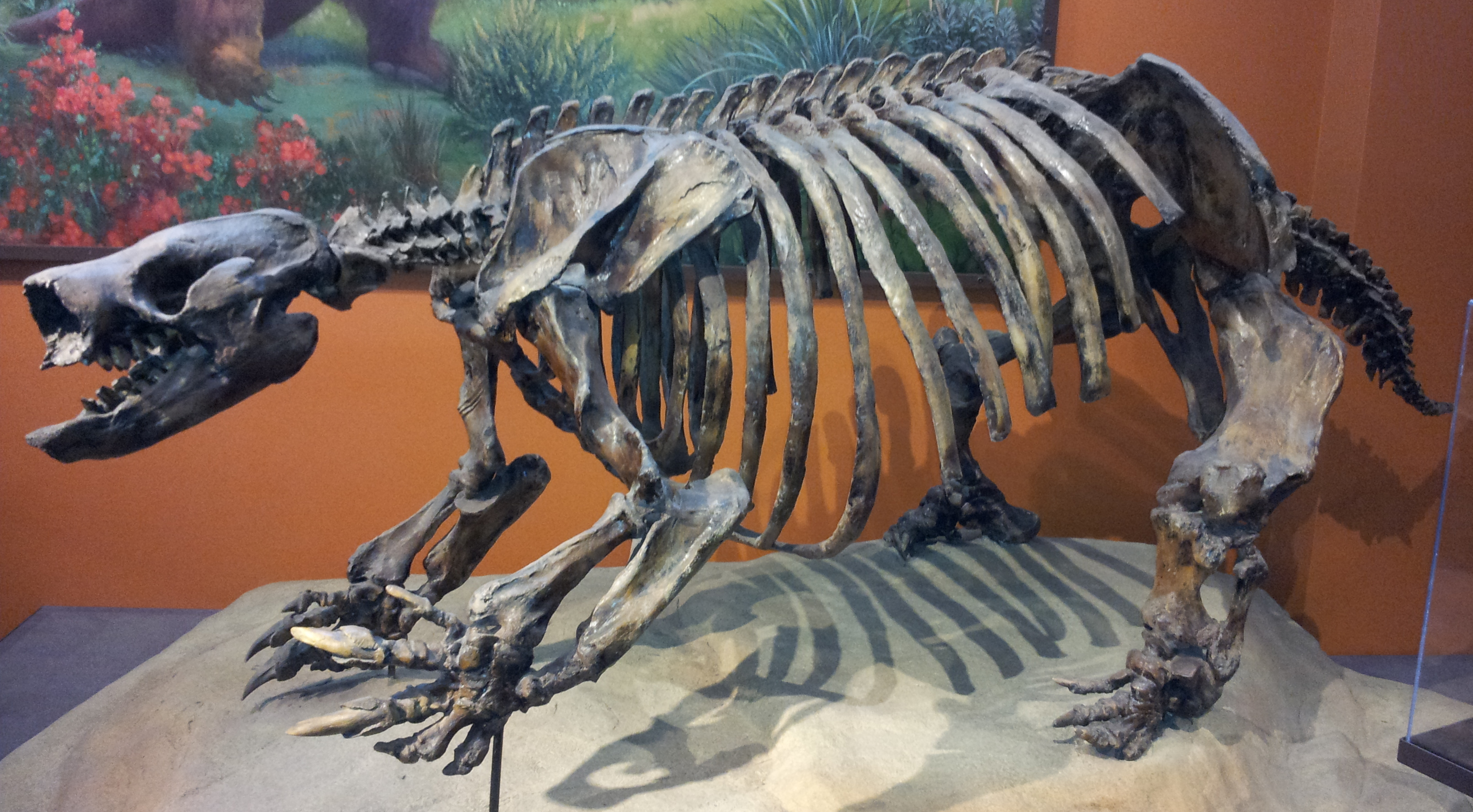
Paramylodon harlani (Mylodontidae, San Diego)

Sloths arose in South America during a long period of isolation and eventually spread to a number of the Caribbean islands as well as North America. It is thought that swimming led to oceanic dispersal of pilosans to the Greater Antilles by the Oligocene, and that the megalonychid Pliometanastes and the mylodontid Thinobadistes were able to colonise North America about 9 million years ago, well before the formation of the Isthmus of Panama. The latter development, about 3 million years ago, allowed megatheriids and nothrotheriids to also invade North America as part of the Great American Interchange. Additionally, the nothrotheriid Thalassocnus of the west coast of South America became adapted to a semiaquatic and, eventually, perhaps fully aquatic marine lifestyle. In Peru and Chile, Thalassocnus entered the coastal habitat beginning in the late Miocene. They presumably waded and paddled in the water for short period, but over a span of 4 million years, they eventually evolved into swimming creatures, becoming specialist bottom feeders of seagrasses, similar to the extant sirenians.

Both types of extant tree sloth tend to occupy the same forests; in most areas, a particular species of the somewhat smaller and generally slower-moving three-toed sloth (Bradypus) and a single species of the two-toed type will jointly predominate. Based on morphological comparisons, it was thought the two-toed sloths nested phylogenetically within one of the divisions of the extinct Greater Antilles sloths. Though data has been collected on over 33 different species of sloths by analyzing bone structures, many of the relationships between clades on a phylogenetic tree were unclear. Much of the morphological evidence collected to support the hypothesis of diphyly has been based on the structure of the inner ear.

Recently obtained molecular data from collagen and mitochondrial DNA sequences fall in line with the diphyly (convergent evolution) hypothesis but have overturned some of the other conclusions obtained from morphology. These investigations consistently place two-toed sloths close to mylodontids and three-toed sloths within Megatherioidea, close to Megalonyx, megatheriids and nothrotheriids. They make the previously recognized family Megalonychidae polyphyletic, with both two-toed sloths and Greater Antilles sloths being moved away from Megalonyx. Greater Antilles sloths are now placed in a separate, basal branch of the sloth evolutionary tree.

=== Phylogeny ===
The following sloth family phylogenetic tree is based on collagen and mitochondrial DNA sequence data.

- Folivora
  - Megalocnidae (Greater Antilles sloths)
  - - - - Scelidotheriidae
        - - Mylodontidae
          - Choloepodidae (two-toed sloths)
      - - - Megalonychidae
          - Bradypodidae (three-toed sloths)
        - - Nothrotheriidae
          - Megatheriidae

=== Extinctions ===
The marine sloths of South America's Pacific coast became extinct at the end of the Pliocene following the closing of the Central American Seaway; the closing caused a cooling trend in the coastal waters which killed off much of the area's seagrass (and which would have also made thermoregulation difficult for the sloths, with their slow metabolism).

Ground sloths disappeared from both North and South America shortly after the appearance of humans about 11,000 years ago. Evidence suggests human hunting contributed to the extinction of the American megafauna. Ground sloth remains found in both North and South America indicate that they were killed, cooked, and eaten by humans. Climate change that came with the end of the last ice age may have also played a role, although previous similar glacial retreats were not associated with similar extinction rates.

Megalocnus and some other Caribbean sloths survived until about 5,000 years ago, long after ground sloths had died out on the mainland, but then went extinct when humans finally colonized the Greater Antilles.

== Biology ==
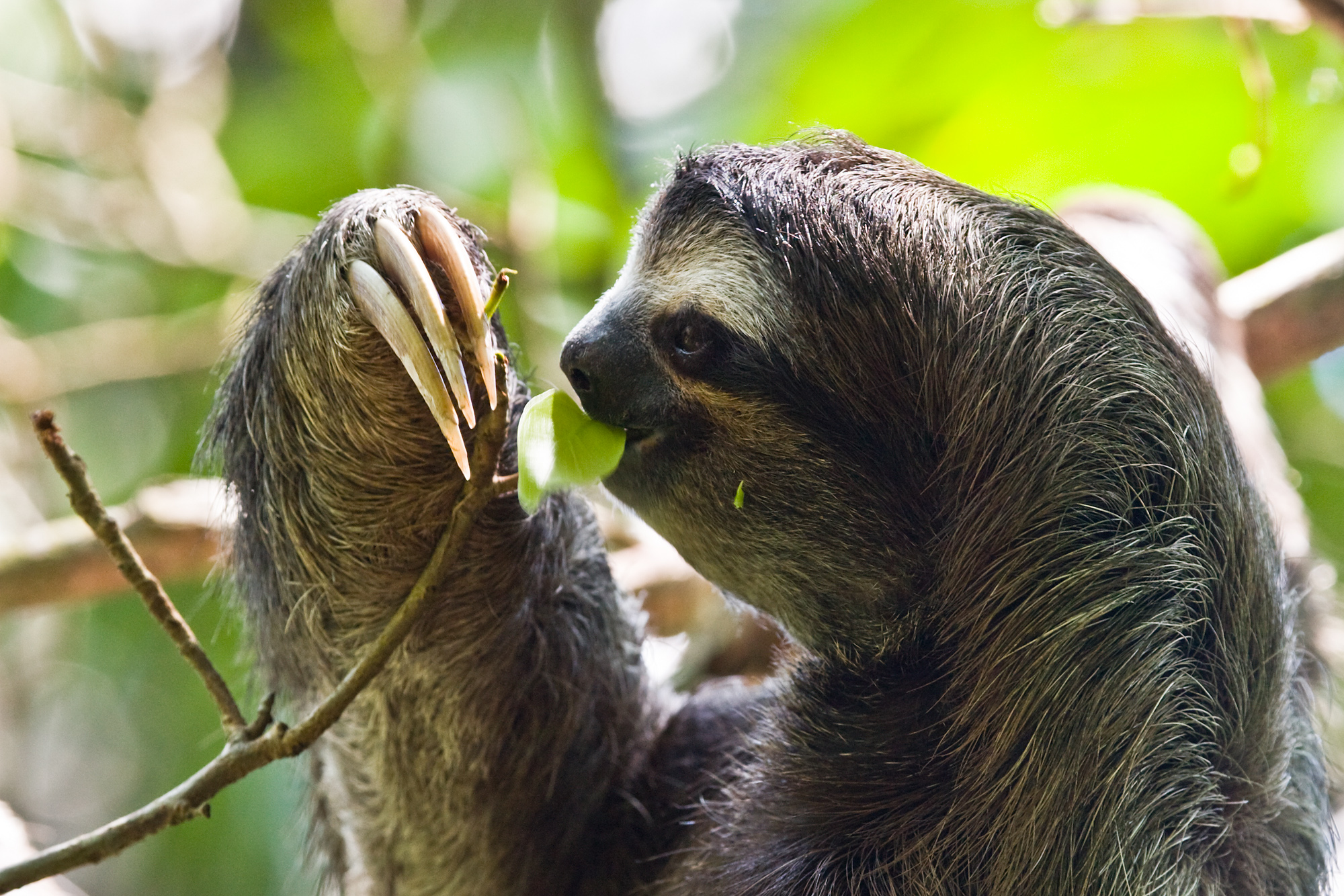
Feeding brown-throated three-toed sloth (Bradypus variegatus), Cahuita National Park, Costa Rica

=== Morphology and anatomy ===
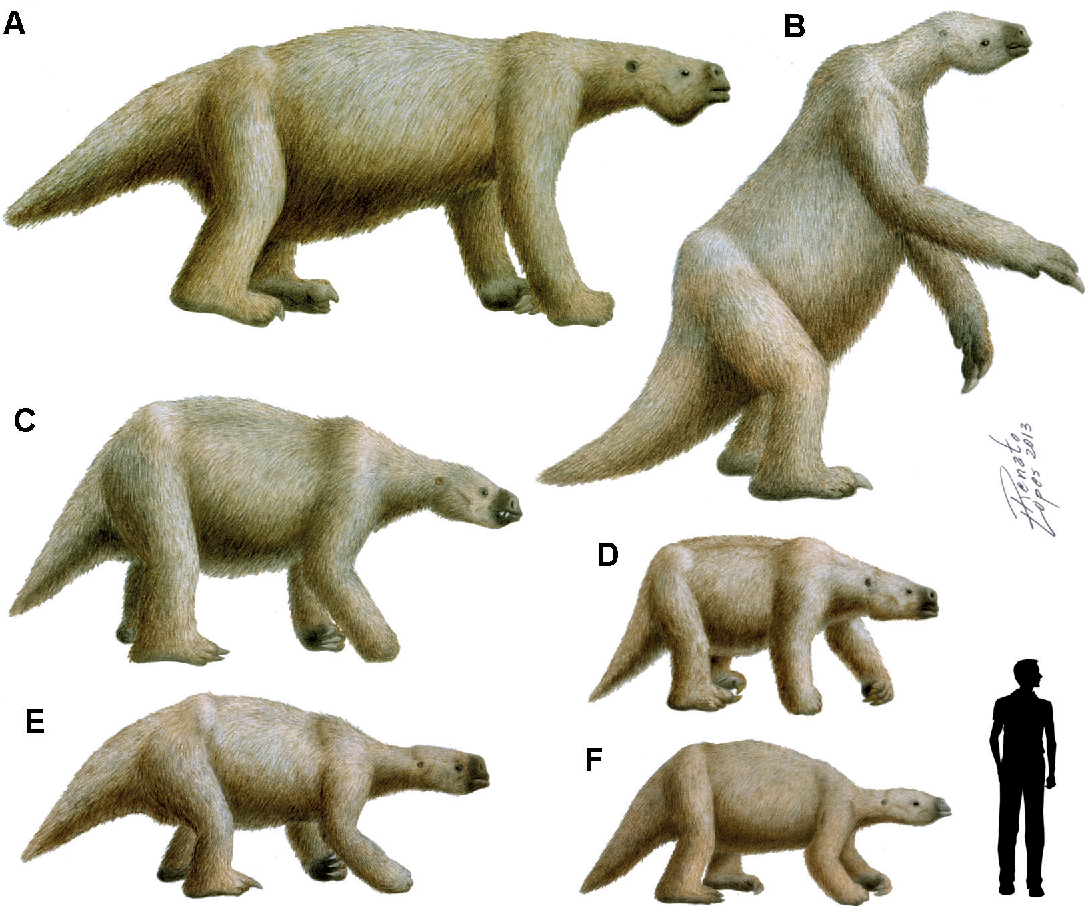
Size comparison of various ground sloths compared to a human, including Megatherium americanum (A, top left) Eremotherium laurillardi (B, top right), Lestodon armatus (C, middle left) Mylodon darwinii (D, middle right) Glossotherium robustum (E, bottom left) and Catonyx cf. C. cuvieri (F, bottom right)

Sloths can be 60 to 80 cm (24 to 31 in) long and, depending on the species, weigh from 3.6 to 7.7 kg (7.9 to 17.0 lb). Two-toed sloths are slightly larger than three-toed sloths. Sloths have long limbs and rounded heads with tiny ears. Three-toed sloths also have stubby tails about 5 to 6 cm (2.0 to 2.4 in) long.

Sloths are unusual among mammals in not having seven cervical vertebrae. Two-toed sloths have five to seven, while three-toed sloths have eight or nine. The other mammals not having seven are the manatees, with six.

=== Physiology ===
Sloths have colour vision but have poor visual acuity. They also have poor hearing. Thus, they rely on their sense of smell and touch to find food.

Sloths have a very low basal or resting metabolic rate (Half of that predicted for a placental mammal of their same body mass), and low body temperatures: 30 to 34 °C (86 to 93 °F) when active, and still lower when resting. Sloths are heterothermic, meaning their body temperature may vary according to the environment, normally ranging from 25 to 35 °C (77 to 95 °F), but able to drop to as low as 20 °C (68 °F), inducing torpor.

Sloths use their forelimbs as their principal mean of propulsion in the trees. Muscle mass of one-sided forelimb makes up 5.1% of total body mass in the brown-throated three-toed sloth and 4.3% in Hoffmann's two-toed sloth; for comparison, muscle mass of one-sided forelimb make up 3.6% in nine-banded armadillo and 3.3% in groundhog. Brown-throated three-toed sloth have a grip strength on the branches equivalent to 99% of their body mass in one side forelimb; for comparison, a Black-capped squirrel monkeys and a Common marmoset have a grip strength equivalent to 74% and 59% of their body mass, respectively. Maximum speed reported for climbing sloths is of 1.6–2.16 km/h (1–1.34 mph) when they are motivated.

Sloth skeletal muscle have very high proportions of oxidative slow twitch (Type I) muscle fibers, with high activity of the anaerobic enzyme CK compared to their other metabolic enzymes despite this. CK activity is low compared with other animals. Their muscle fibers proportion would be an adaptation to consume energy more slowly and their principally anaerobic muscle metabolism would be to use energy production sources faster and cheaper, such as ATP production by CK pathway. This would be a product of their suspensory lifestyle.

The outer hairs of sloth fur grow in a direction opposite from that of other mammals. In most mammals, hairs grow toward the extremities, but because sloths spend so much time with their limbs above their bodies, their hairs grow away from the extremities to provide protection from the elements while they hang upside down. In most conditions, the fur hosts symbiotic algae, which provide camouflage from predatory jaguars, ocelots, and harpy eagles. Because of the algae, sloth fur is a small ecosystem of its own, hosting many species of commensal and parasitic arthropods. There are a large number of arthropods associated with sloths. These include biting and blood-sucking flies such as mosquitoes and sandflies, triatomine bugs, lice, ticks, and mites. Sloths have a highly specific community of commensal beetles, mites, and moths. The species of sloths recorded to host arthropods include the pale-throated three-toed sloth, the brown-throated three-toed sloth, and Linnaeus's two-toed sloth. Sloths benefit from their relationship with moths because the moths are responsible for fertilizing algae on the sloth, which provides them with nutrients.

=== Activity ===
Sloth limbs are adapted for hanging and grasping, not for supporting their weight. Muscle mass makes up only 25 to 30 percent of their total body weight. Most other mammals have a muscle mass that makes up 40 to 45 percent of their total body weight. Their specialised hands and feet have long, curved claws to allow them to hang upside down from branches without effort, and are used to drag themselves along the ground, since they cannot walk. On three-toed sloths, the arms are 50 percent longer than the legs.

Sloths move only when necessary and even then, very slowly. They usually move at an average speed of 4 m (13 ft) per minute but can move at a marginally higher speed of 4.5 m (15 ft) per minute if they are in immediate danger from a predator. While they sometimes sit on top of branches, they usually eat, sleep, and even give birth hanging from branches. They sometimes remain hanging from branches even after death. On the ground, the maximum speed of sloths is 3 m (9.8 ft) per minute. Two-toed sloths are generally better able than three-toed sloths to disperse between clumps of trees on the ground.

Sloths are surprisingly strong swimmers and can reach speeds of 13.5 m (44 ft) per minute. They use their long arms to paddle through the water and can cross rivers and swim between islands. Sloths can reduce their already slow metabolism even further and slow their heart rate to less than a third of normal, allowing them to hold their breath underwater for up to 40 minutes.

Wild brown-throated three-toed sloths sleep on average 9.6 hours a day. Two-toed sloths are nocturnal. Three-toed sloths are mostly nocturnal but can be active in the day. They spend 90 percent of their time motionless.

=== Behavior ===
Sloths are solitary animals that rarely interact with one another except during breeding season, though female sloths do sometimes congregate, more so than do males.

Sloths descend about once every eight days to defecate on the ground. The reason and mechanism behind this behaviour have long been debated among scientists. There are at least five hypotheses:

1. To fertilize trees when feces are deposited at the base of the tree,
2. To cover feces and avoid predation,
3. To serve as chemical communication between individuals,
4. To pick up trace nutrients in their claws, that are then ingested, and
5. To favor a mutualistic relationship with populations of fur moths.

More recently, a new hypothesis has emerged, which presents evidence against the previous ones and proposes that all current sloths are descendants from species that defecated on the ground, and there simply has not been enough selective pressure to abandon this behavior, since cases of predation during defecation are actually very rare.

=== Diet ===
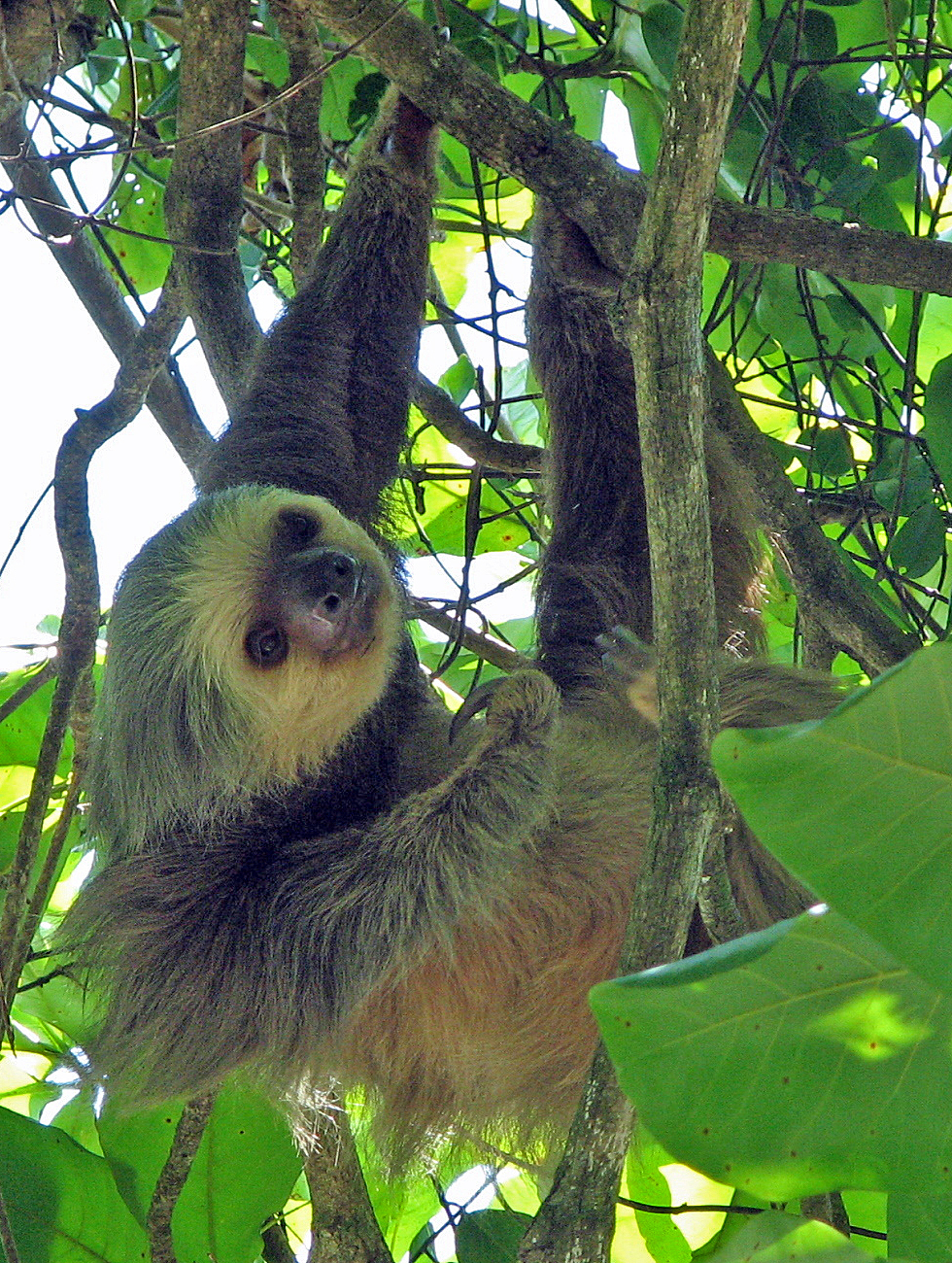
Hoffman's two-toed sloth (Choloepus hoffmanni) feeding in Manuel Antonio National Park in Costa Rica

Baby sloths learn what to eat by licking the lips of their mother. All sloths eat the leaves of Cecropia.

Two-toed sloths are omnivorous, with a diverse diet of insects, carrion, fruits, leaves, and small lizards, ranging over up to 140 hectares (350 acres). Three-toed sloths, on the other hand, are almost entirely herbivorous (plant eaters), with a limited diet of leaves from only a few trees, and no other mammal digests its food as slowly.

They have made adaptations to arboreal browsing. Leaves, their main food source, provide very little energy or nutrients, and do not digest easily, so sloths have large, slow-acting, multi-chambered stomachs in which symbiotic bacteria break down the tough leaves. As much as two-thirds of a well-fed sloth's body weight consists of the contents of its stomach, and the digestive process can take a month or more to complete.

Three-toed sloths go to the ground to urinate and defecate about once a week, digging a hole and covering it afterwards. They go to the same spot each time and are vulnerable to predation while doing so. Considering the large energy expenditure and dangers involved in the journey to the ground, this behaviour has been described as a mystery. Recent research shows that moths, which live in the sloth's fur, lay eggs in the sloth's feces. When they hatch, the larvae feed on the feces, and when mature fly up onto the sloth above. These moths may have a symbiotic relationship with sloths, as they live in the fur and promote growth of algae, which the sloths eat. Individual sloths tend to spend the bulk of their time feeding on a single "modal" tree; by burying their excreta near the trunk of that tree, they may also help nourish it.

=== Reproduction ===
The pale- and brown-throated three-toed sloths mate seasonally, while the maned three-toed sloth breeds at any time of the year. The reproduction of pygmy three-toed sloths is currently unknown. Litters are of one newborn only, after six months' gestation for three-toed, and 12 months for two-toed. Newborns stay with their mother for about five months. In some cases, young sloths die from a fall indirectly because the mothers prove unwilling to leave the safety of the trees to retrieve the young. Females normally bear one baby every year, but sometimes sloths' low level of movement actually keeps females from finding males for longer than one year. Sloths are not particularly sexually dimorphic and several zoos have received sloths of the wrong sex.

The average lifespan of two-toed sloths in the wild is currently unknown due to a lack of full-lifespan studies in a natural environment. Median life expectancy in human care is about 16 years and one individual at the Smithsonian Institution's National Zoo reached an age of 49 years before her death.

== Distribution ==
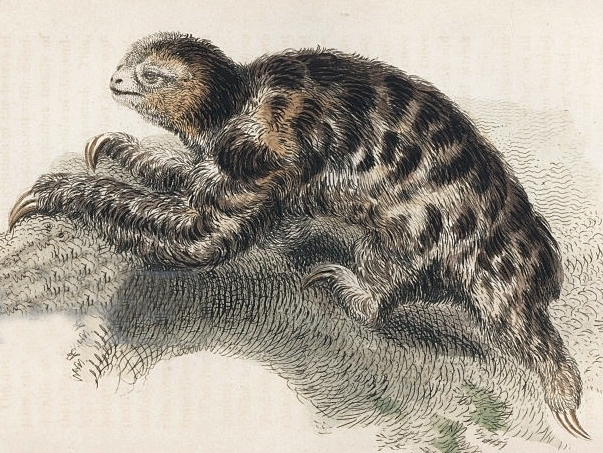
Depiction of a pygmy three-toed sloth (Bradypus pygmaeus) (Thomas Landseer, 1825)

Although habitat is limited to the tropical rainforests of Central and South America, in that environment sloths are successful. On Barro Colorado Island in Panama, sloths have been estimated to constitute 70 percent of the biomass of arboreal mammals. Four of the six living species are currently rated "least concern"; the maned three-toed sloth (Bradypus torquatus), which inhabits Brazil's dwindling Atlantic Forest, is classified as "vulnerable", while the island-dwelling pygmy three-toed sloth (B. pygmaeus) is critically endangered. Sloths' lower metabolism confines them to the tropics, and they adopt thermoregulation behaviors of cold-blooded animals such as sunning themselves.

== Human relations ==
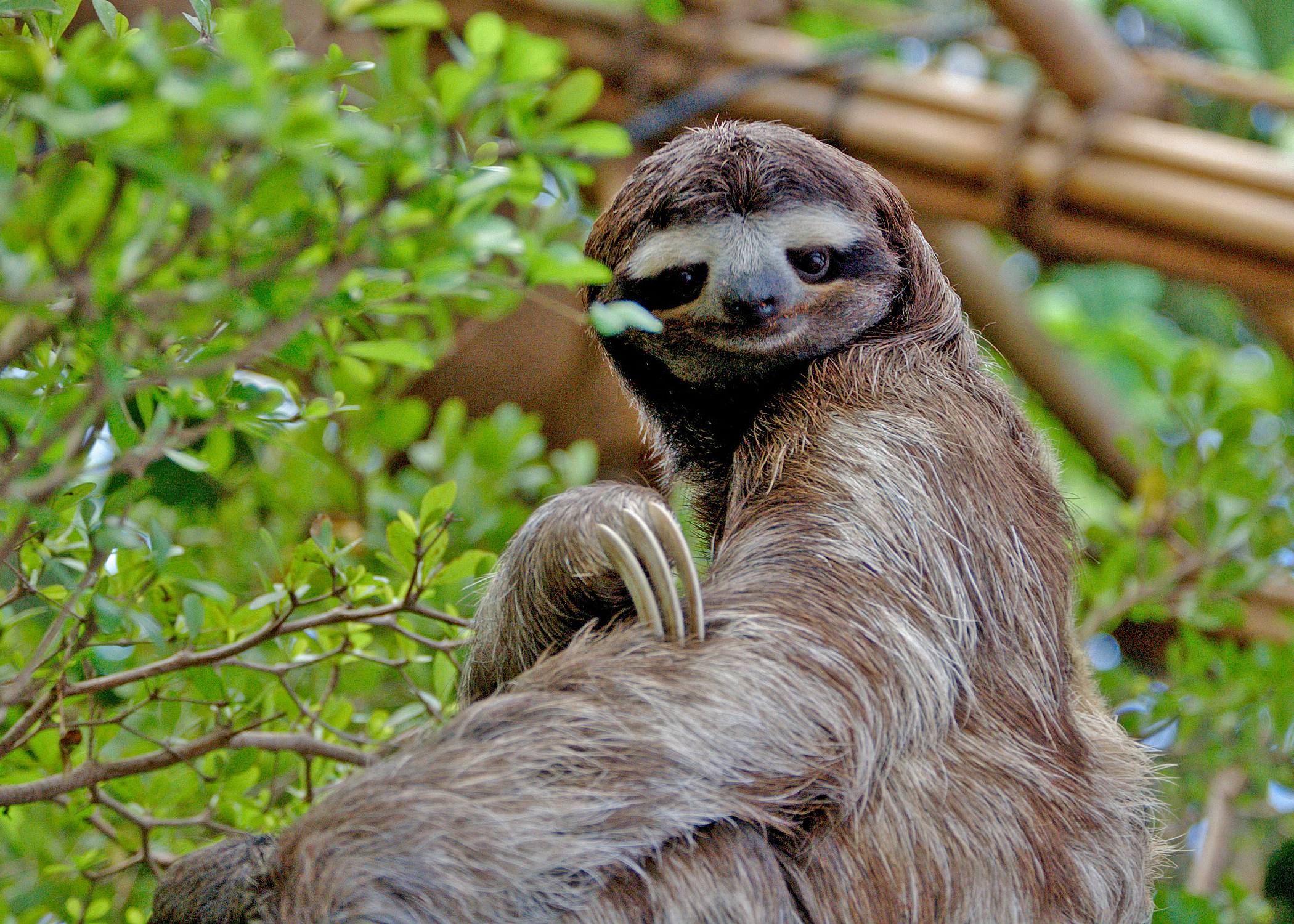
Three-toed sloth in the Dallas World Aquarium

The majority of recorded sloth deaths in Costa Rica are due to contact with electrical lines and poachers. Their claws also provide another, unexpected deterrent to human hunters; when hanging upside-down in a tree, they are held in place by the claws themselves and often do not fall down even if shot from below.

Sloths are victims of animal trafficking where they are sold as pets. However, they generally make very poor pets, due to their specialized ecology.
