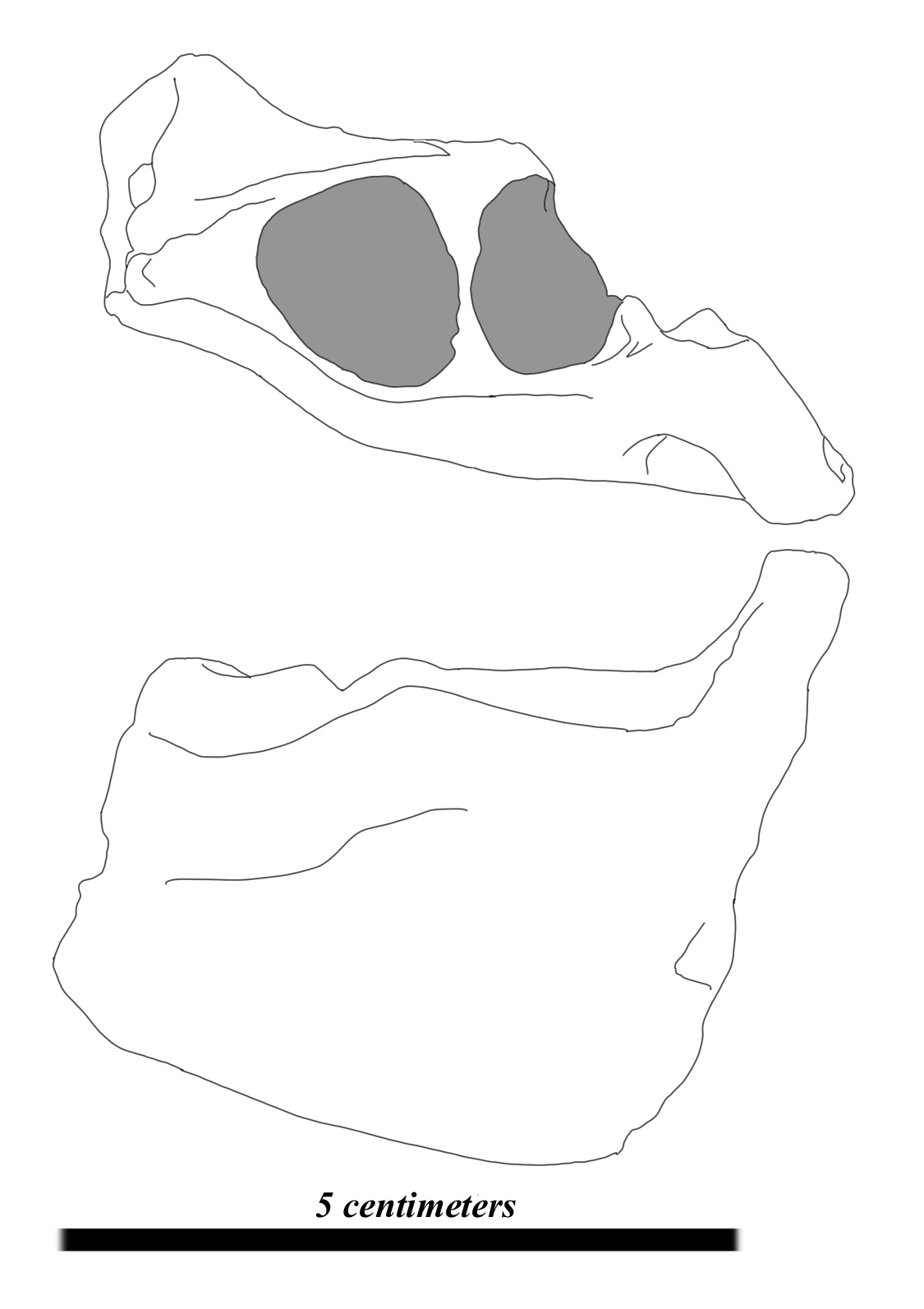
- Illustration of the cast of the holotype dentary (MLP M 62).

Scientific classification
- Kingdom: Animalia
- Phylum: Chordata
- Class: Mammalia
- Order: Pilosa
- Suborder: Folivora
- Family: †Megalonychidae
- Genus: †Ortotherium; Ameghino, 1885
- Species: †O. laticurvatum

Binomial name
- †Ortotherium laticurvatum Ameghino, 1885

Synonyms
- Menilaus affinis Ameghino, 1891; Ortotherium schlosseri Ameghino, 1891; Ortotherium seneum Ameghino, 1891; Amphiocnus seneum (Ameghino, 1891); Ortotherium scrofum Bordas, 1942

= Ortotherium =

Ortotherium Temporal range: Late Miocene Huayquerian ~9–6.8 Ma

Extinct genus of ground sloth

Ortotherium ("upright beast") is a genus of megalonychid ground sloth from the Late Miocene (Huayquerian SALMA, around 9 to 6.8 million years ago) Ituzaingó Formation of Entre Rios Province, Argentina. Although many species were described, the only valid species of the genus is Ortotherium laticurvatum, with many species being junior synonyms. Ortotherium is known from very fragmentary material, all of which is material from the mandible (lower jaw) and teeth. The holotype (specimen a scientific name is applied to) of O. laticurvatum consists of an incomplete left dentary that had been unearthed from a series of sediments known as 'Conglomerado osifero' in Paraná, Argentina. Argentina paleontologist Florentino Ameghino named the species in 1885, though he would go on to name four more, invalid, species of the genus. One species however, O. brevirostrum, has been reclassified as Mesopotamocnus.

Due to Ortotherium being known from very scant fossils, little is definitively known about the animal. However, much can be inferred based on related taxa. Ortotherium was average-sized for a Huayquerian megalonychid, being around 65 kg (143.3 lbs) using the similarly proportioned genus Eucholoeops. Ortotherium has a long mandible, with large, rectangular molars preceded by a giant caniniform. It had long, robust forelimbs terminating in a series of enlarged claws, using a mix of quadrupedal and bipedal movement, possibly permitting tree climbing. The hindlimbs were large and pillar-like supported by a lengthy tail.

Being a megalonychid, Ortotherium was a herbivorous mammal that likely consumed a large amount of leafy plant material. Their jaws and teeth were built for a shearing and cutting method of mastication, bearing sharp teeth and a wide array of jaw movement. The Ituzaingó Formation that Ortotherium inhabited was subtropical, with a mix of swampy woodlands and more open grasslands present. Fossils of mangroves indicate parts of the formation bore a shoreline marine ecosystem along the warm, salty waters of the Paranaense Sea. This allowed for a wide array of fauna to inhabit the area, which included many different genera of ground sloths, "native ungulates", and rodents, in addition to a menagerie of birds, including the large carnivorous "terror birds", as well as fish and reptiles.

== History ==
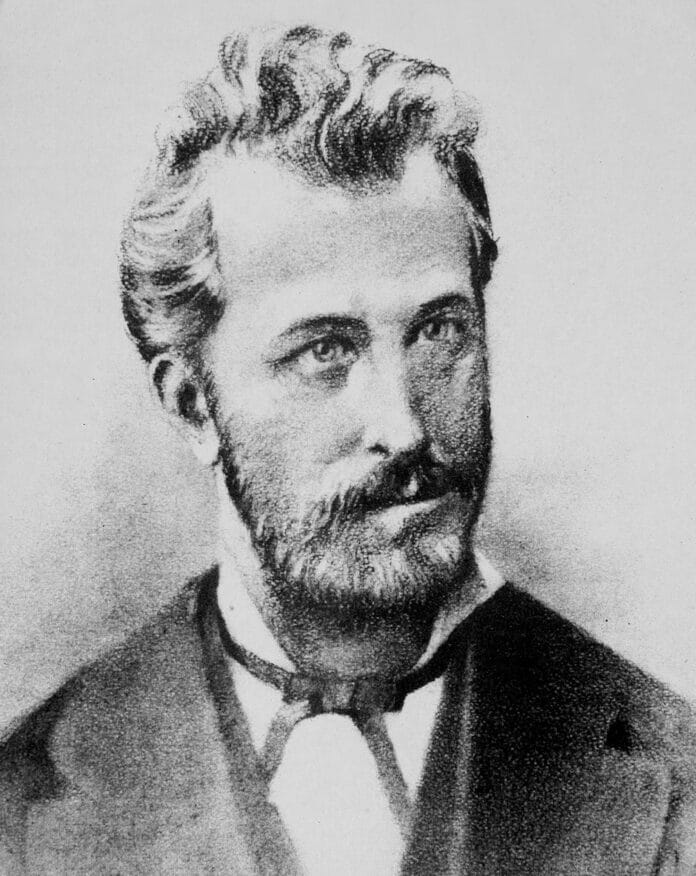
Portrait of Florentino Ameghino, describer of Ortotherium.

The earliest published record of Ortotherium was in 1885, when a partial left dentary (lower jawbone) lacking preserved teeth that had been unearthed from the Upper Miocene strata of "Conglomerado osifero" (ossiferous conglomerate) near Paraná in Entre Rios Province, Argentina. It was described by prolific Argentine paleontologist Florentino Ameghino in his monograph on fossils from the area. Ameghino named the type species Ortotherium laticurvatum, the specific name coming from the laterally curved lower jaw. The holotype (name-bearing) specimen of O. laticurvatum has been lost, though a plaster cast exists in the Museo de La Plata. Ameghino, mistakenly believed that the rock layers of Parana dated to the Oligocene, a much older epoch. Ameghino noted the large size of the molariform and caniniform cavities, believing that Ortotherium may be synonymous with the taxon Olygodon, which he had named on the basis of large molariforms. Ortotherium, however, is a distinct taxon that comes from different aged sediments. O. laticurvatum was one of three species Ameghino named, fostering the novel species of O.schlosseri and O. seneum in an 1891 paper, both of which were also based on fragmented mandibular material. Ameghino dubbed a new genus and species of ground sloth, Menilaus affinis, in the same 1891 work. M. affinis was named on the basis of another imperfect left mandible from "Conglomerado osifero". Menilaus has since been synonymized with Ortotherium laticurvatum, lacking any distinct traits that differ itself from the species.

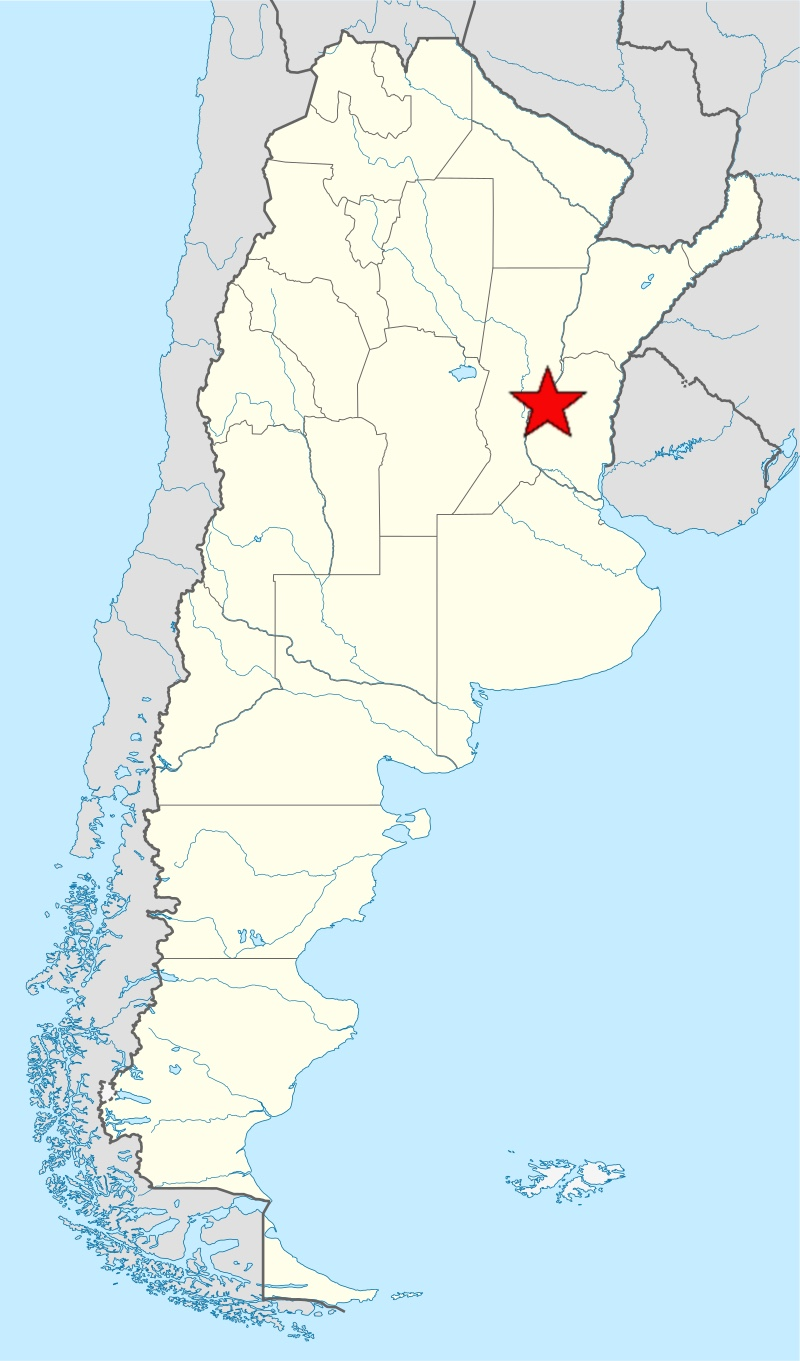
Map of Argentina showing where all fossils of Ortotherium have been unearthed (marked by a star)

Ameghino was a very active paleontologist, naming hundreds of new genera and species during his academic career in Argentina. Following his death in 1911, analysis of his taxa and scrutiny of his work came about. Lucas Kraglievich was one of these paleontologists, reclassifying O. seneum as a species of the other megalonychid Amphiocnus and considered Menilaus congeneric with Pliomorphus. Later in 1942, paleontologist A. F. Bordas dubbed another two species of Ortotherium, the specimens composed of only mandible material. The species, O. brevirostrum and O. scrofum, though the latter is currently considered a synonym of O. laticurvatum. The 21st century saw extensive review of the genus and its many species by Diego Brandoni first in 2010 in which he did a full overview of all species. In his 2010 review, he synonymized all of Ortotherium's species with the exception of O. brevirostrum which he noted likely belonged to a separate genus. Brandoni also described fossils of an indeterminate species, including a nearly complete left mandible that had a different placement of an opening in the mandibular canal (a ridge running along the sides of the mandible) compared to O. laticurvatum. However, this was not seen as enough to justify naming a novel species according to Brandoni. Four years later, Brandoni erected the generic name Mesopotamocnus for O. brevirostrum, the name deriving from its geographic provenance in Mespotamia, Argentina and ocnus meaning "slowness", a commonly used root for the generic names of ground sloths.

== Taxonomy ==
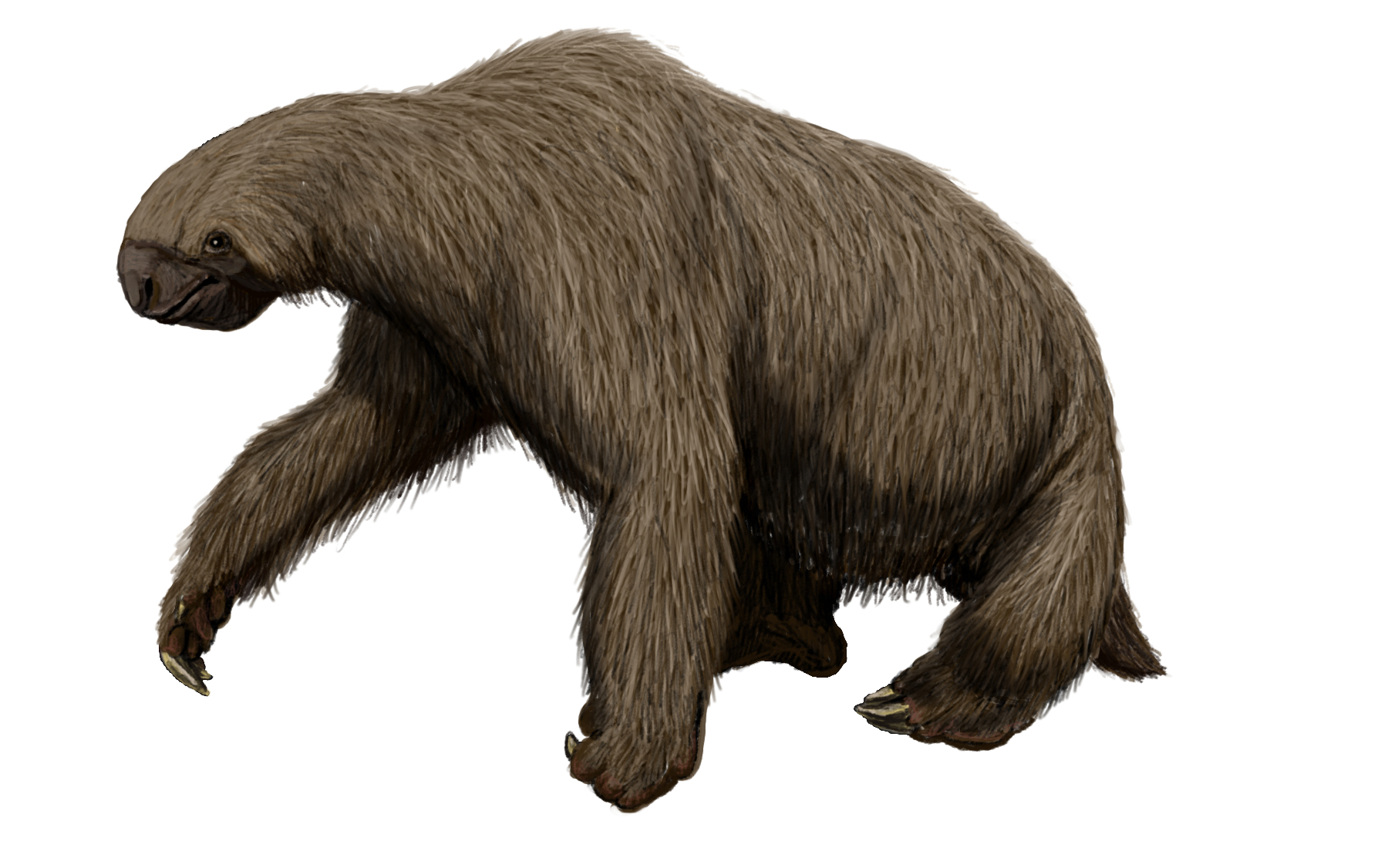
Life restoration of the related ground sloth Megalonyx.

Ortotherium was a megalonychid sloth, a family within the order Folivora which contains all of sloths. Megalonychids existed from the Deseadan SALMA (29–21 mya) to the Rancholabrean NALMA (240,000 BCE to 11,000 BCE), the last surviving genus being Megalonyx itself from North America. Megalonychids were long-considered to be an extant group including the two-toed sloth genus Choeloepus, however analyses of the collagen and DNA of fossils of folivorans proved that Choloepus was instead related to Mylodontids, another family of ground sloths. Fossils of early megalonychids are rare, the oldest named being of the genus Deseadognathus from Argentina and Bolivia, though even older fossils from the Early Oligocene have been tentatively reported from Puerto Rico. The megalonychids later saw an explosion in diversity during the Middle-Upper Miocene in the Americas, primarily among the Santacrucian (17.5–16.3 mya) and Friasian (16.3–15.5) sites of Argentina, Uruguay, Venezuela, and Brazil. Extensive waterways formed in South America during this period, giving way to a more subtropical climate fostering a variety of flora and fauna to evolve in this environment. Megalonychids also expanded their range north, with genera like Zacatzontli from Mexico evolving on the North American continent prior to the development of the Isthmus of Panama.

The internal phylogeny of Megalonychidae, specifically taxa like Ortotherium, is tenuous as many taxa bear only fragmentary or incomplete specimens. This has caused Ortotherium, a genus known purely from partial mandibles and teeth, to be excluded from the majority of megalonychid cladistic analyses. The only exception being by McDonald & Carranza-Castañeda (2017) in their description of Zacatzontli, a megalonychid from the Late Miocene of southern Mexico. In their analysis, three separate clades related to biogeography were recovered, with a South American clade, including Ortotherium, Caribbean clade, and a North American clade. The Caribbean and North American taxa formed a separate subfamily from the South American, suggesting that the southern megalonychid branch broke off earlier in the Oligocene. When originally named by Ameghino in 1885, he did not specify the phylogenetic position of the genus besides Edentata, though he did state similarities to Bradypus and the nomen dubium Olygodon. Family-level assessment in 1942, Bordas believed that Ortotherium was part of the clade Nothrotheriinae, then believed to be within Megalonychidae. As part of his review of the genus, Brandoni moved Ortotherium to an indeterminate position within Megalonychidae, though noted similarities to other Miocene megalonychids.

The following cladistic diagram is adapted from McDonald & Caranza-Castañeda (2017), their description of Zacatzontli:

- Megalonychidae
  - Hapalops
  - - - Megistonyx
      - - Zacatzontli
        - - Ortotherium
          - - Ahytherium
            - - Deseadognathus
              - - Proschismotherium
                - Mesopotamocnus
                - Australonyx
    - - Eucholoeops
      - - Megalonyx
        - - Aratocnus
          - Neocnus
          - - Megalocnus
            - - Parocnus
              - Pliometanastes

== Description ==
Although scant material is known, estimations of the mass and length of related genera of similar size and proportions have been made. Ortotherium was slightly larger than Eucholoeops and around the same size as Paranabradys. Eucholoeops was between 60 and 65 kg in weight, though some estimates reach 80 kg, giving an idea for the mass of Ortotherium. Megalonychids like Ortotherium were heavily built for their size, with large, plantigrade (flat-footed) hindlimbs that supported its large mass. It has been suggested that, with their long, stiff tails as support, megalonychids could reach a semi-erect position that could enable eating at greater heights. The hands were tridactyl terminating in large claws, the namesake for the family, that had defensive as well as browsing capabilities.

=== Mandibles and teeth ===
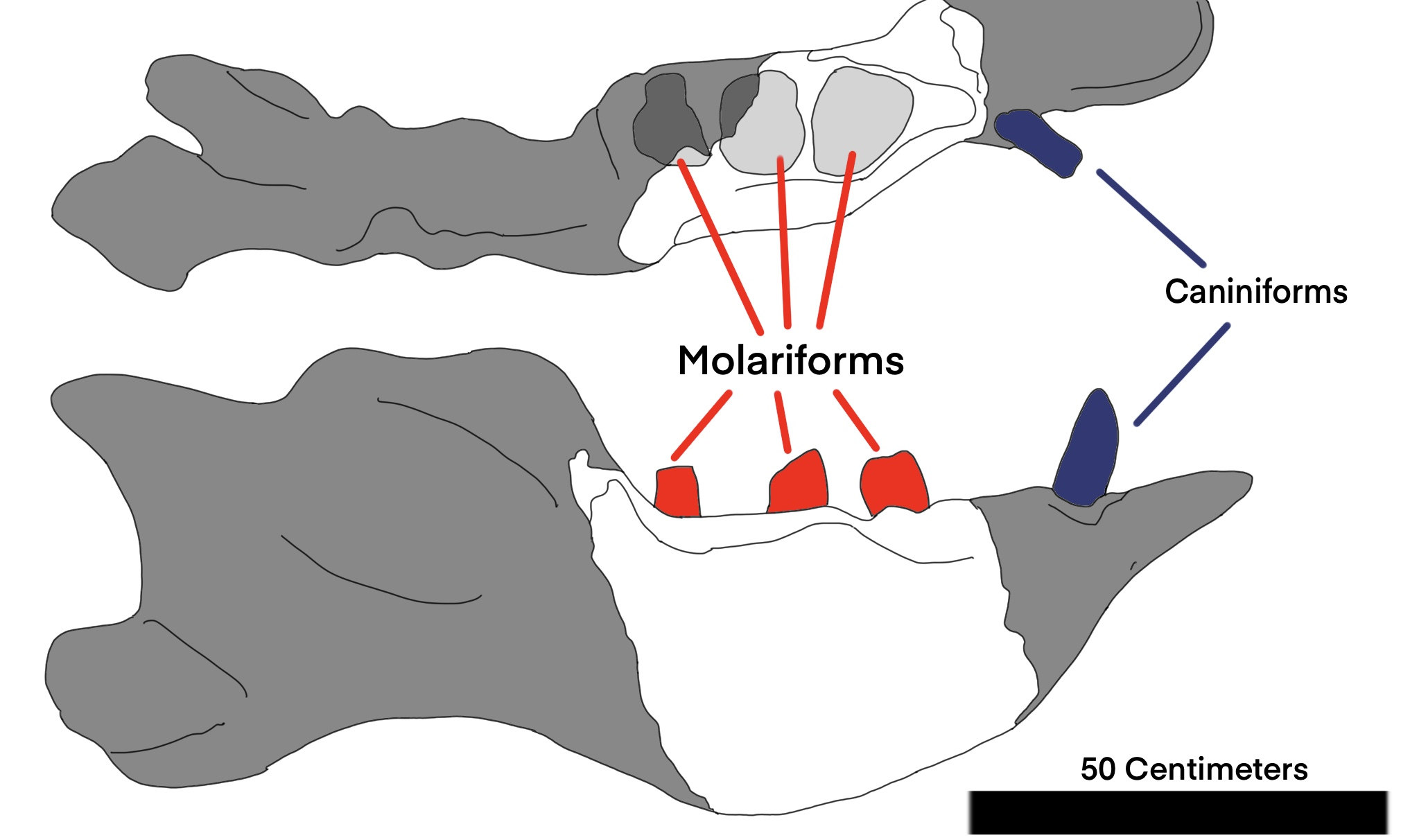
Reconstruction of the mandible based on the type cast (white) with teeth labeled.

O. laticurvatum preserves a wide array of individual variation, with the size of teeth, mandible length, and height varying greatly. The proportions also fluctuate, causing many specimens to be misinterpreted previously as their own species. The mandible is exceptionally deep and robust compared to related taxa, with the largest specimen preserving a ramus that reaches 6 centimeters thick, though the size varies widely among individuals. The ventral margin is convex, transversely and anterioposteriorily, creating the thickness and robusticity seen. An opening on the posterolateral face of the mandibular canal is on the coronoid process in O. laticurvatum, however specimen MACN Pv-8916 of Ortotherium sp. bears this opening anterior to the process. The anatomy of O. laticurvatum is more similar to genera like Megalonyx and Paranabradys in this aspect, suggesting that MACN Pv-8916 may be from a distinct species. All megalonychids had hypsodont (high-crowned) teeth, as in the teeth of Ortotherium. The third molariform (cheek tooth) lines up with the anterior margin of the coronoid process, making the entire tooth visible in lateral (side) view. All megalonychids bear only four teeth on their lower jaws that is divided by a large diastema (toothless gap) between the caniniform and the first molar. Caniniforms of Ortotherium are ovate with a posteromedial bulge, their position strongly protruding from the anterior end of the mandible. The tip of the mandible was U-shaped, with long and boxy sides composing the ramus. Along the tooth row, alveoli are present along the mandibular near the molars, the first being triangular, second oval, and third suboval.

The diagnostic traits (characteristics that distinguish a taxon from others) of the genus include: an anterior margin of coronoid process lateral to midpoint of the molariform 3 (molariform abbreviated as m), more anterior than in the fellow megalonychids Eucholoeops and Paranabradys, and more posterior than in Megalocnus, Megalonyx, and Pliometanastes. The posterior edge of mandibular symphysis inferomedial to the caniniform–m1 diastema; inferomedial to m1/m2 interval; inferomedial to the caniniforms. This is a combination of traits not present in other megalonychids, with taxa like Megalocnus preserving the former trait but lacking the latter two, giving credence to Ortotherium's independence as a genus. Alveolus of the caniniforms are elliptical in cross-section and small relative to molariforms, in contrast to the larger molariforms of Megalonyx and Megalocnus. The first molariform is subtrapezoidal in cross-section, while it is subrectangular in Megalonyx and Megalocnus. The m2 and m3 are oval in cross-section, a distinct trait compared to Megalonyx and Megalocnus. As in most genera in the megalonychid grade, the mandible has a diastema between the caniniforms and molar row, differing from Diabolotherium nordenskioldi in which it is absent. This unique combination of characteristics proves Ortotherium's validity.

== Paleoenvironment ==
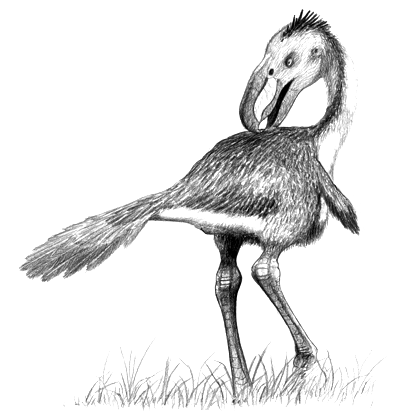
Life restoration of the "terror bird" Andalgalornis, which coexisted with Ortotherium.

Ortotherium is known from the Ituzaingó Formation, the fossils being deposited in a series of sediments made up of fine quartz gravel, clay, and chalcedony clasts called the "Conglomerado osifero". The strata of the Ituzaingó Formation date to the Late Miocene, a period in which animal biodiversity boomed in South America, with the advent of the faunas of formations such as the Santa Cruz, Pebas, Cerro Azul, and Urumaco strata. During the Late Miocene, water levels in South America rose and a selection of tropical habitats formed in large river basins such as the Pebas System and Paranese Sea, the latter bordering the Ituzaingó Formation. The Ituzaingó Formation's deposits are from the beaches of the Paranese Sea, transforming the environment into a subtropical one, as demonstrated by the strata's paleoflora and paleofauna. The paleoflora is diverse, but includes the aquatic mangroves and terrestrial legumes, bamboos, flowering shrubs, and more. Bamboos, coconut palms, and other palms were prevalent, being very common. The Ituzaingó Formation also had savannahs in addition to the coastal, riverine, and tropical segments.

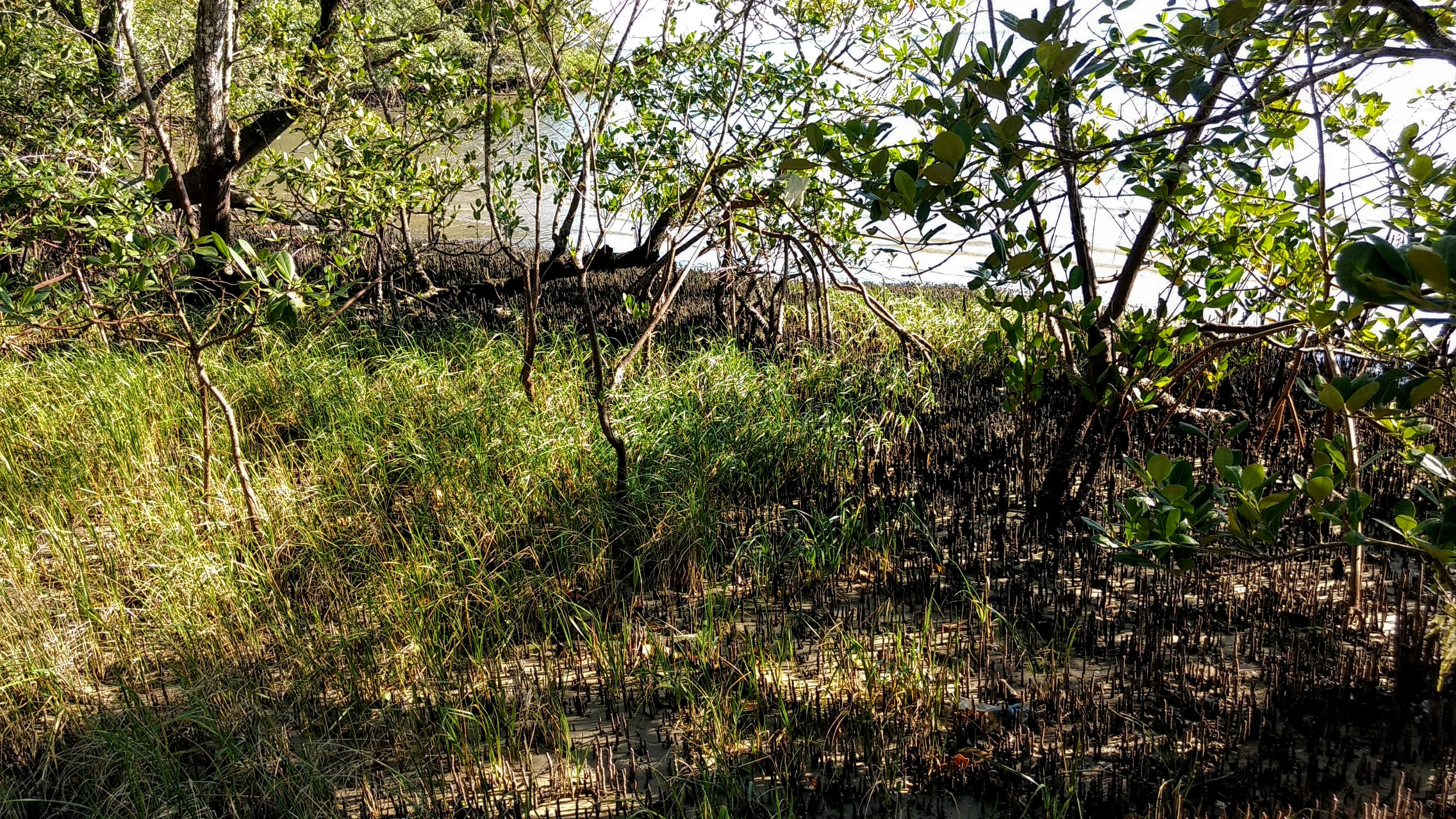
Image of Amazonian tidal mudflats, a similar environment to Ituzaingó.

The Ituzaingó Formation preserves vast tidal flats similar to those in the modern day Amazon and a warm climate. Other ground sloths are endemic to the site such as the megalonychids Pliomorphus, Amphiocnus, and Mesopotamocnus, megatheriids Promegatherium and Pyramiodontherium, and mylodontids Octomylodon, Megabradys, and Promylodon. Notoungulate mammals in the Ituzaingó Formation were widespread, including the toxodontids Xotodon and Adinotherium, and litopterns such as Brachytherium, Cullinia, Diadiaphorus, Neobrachytherium, Oxyodontherium, Paranauchenia, Promacrauchenia, Proterotherium and Scalabrinitherium. Large, armored glyptodonts like Palaehoplophorus, Eleutherocercus, and Plohophorus lived in the area as well as other cingulates like the pampatheres Kraglievichia and Scirrotherium. Carnivores included the phorusrhacids Devincenzia and Andalgalornis and sparassodonts, with giant crocodilians like Gryposuchus and Mourasuchus in the freshwater. Ortotherium was likely a leaf-eater based on studies of megalonychid masticatory and dental morphology and capabilities, of which there was an abundance of greenery that could be comfortably chewed and digested.
