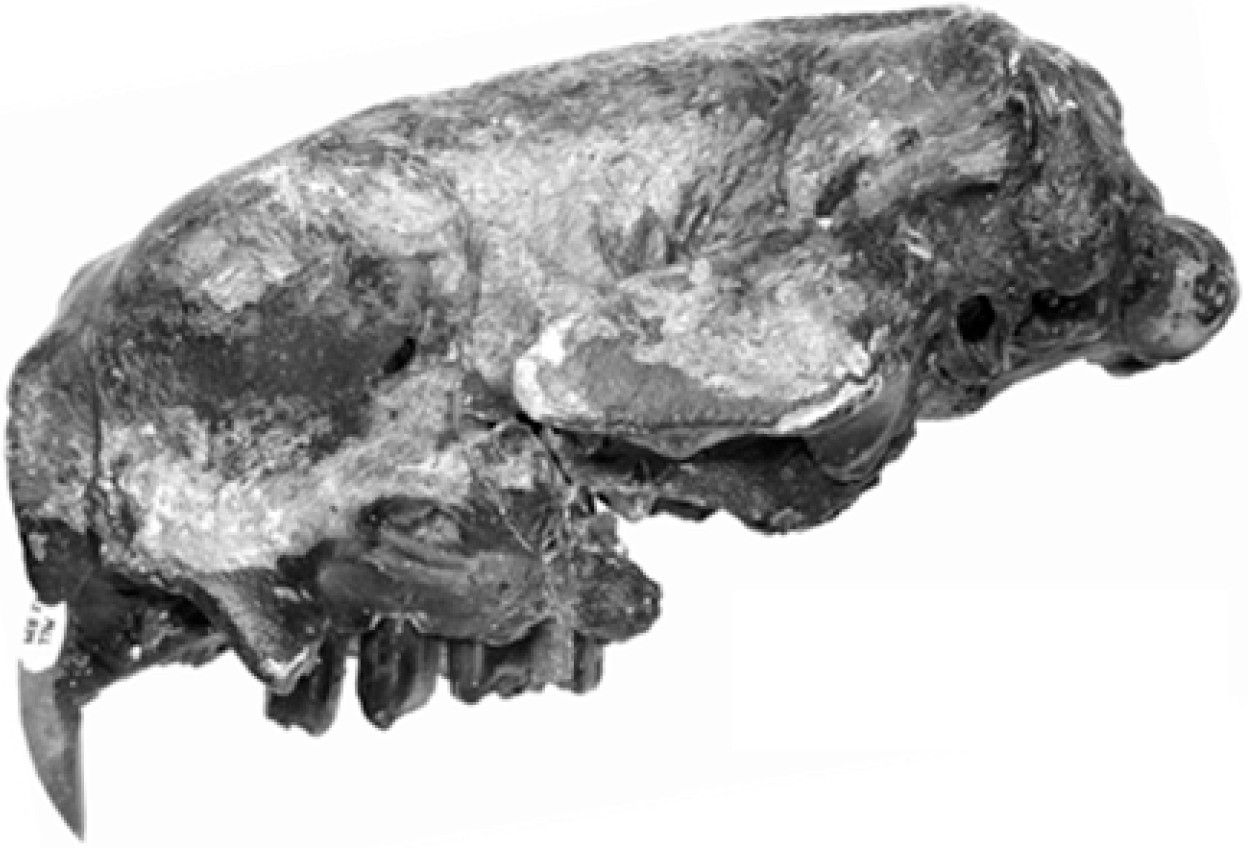
- Skull

Scientific classification
- Kingdom: Animalia
- Phylum: Chordata
- Class: Mammalia
- Order: Pilosa
- Family: †Megalonychidae
- Genus: †Ahytherium; Cartelle et al., 2008
- Species: †A. aureum

Binomial name
- †Ahytherium aureum Cartelle et al., 2008

= Ahytherium =

Ahytherium Temporal range: Late Pleistocene (Lujanian)

Extinct genus of sloths

Poço Azul (Brazil)

Ahytherium is an extinct genus of megalonychid sloth that lived during the Pleistocene of what is now Brazil. It is a monotypic genus that contains a single species, A. aureum.

== Discovery and taxonomy ==
The almost-complete skeleton of Ahytherium alongside remains of another extinct sloth species, Australonyx, were discovered in Poço Azul, an underwater cave in Chapada Diamantina National Park in 2005. It was described by Castor Cartelle of Pontifícia Universidade Católica de Minas Gerais. The bones, which had a length of about 3 metres (9.8 ft) when put together, belong to an animal which presumably was still growing.

== Description ==
This animal is known from well-preserved and nearly complete fossils, including a skeleton of an immature specimen, which in life must have been about three meters long, one meter tall and weighing perhaps half a ton. Like all ground sloths, Ahytherium was equipped with a robust body and legs equipped with powerful claws. Ahytherium was similar to other ground sloths such as Megalonyx but possessed some features that clearly distinguished it: the head, for example, was extremely short and tall, and possessed dorsally swollen frontal bones. The zygomatic arches were wide, particularly the frontal processes, while the lacrimal bones were narrow, blade-shaped and directed anterolaterally. The dentition included canine teeth that were thin, curved and oval in cross-section. The humerus was equipped with a poorly developed deltopectoral crest, while the femur possessed a large trochanter located distally. The shape of the caudal vertebrae indicates that the tail was dorsoventrally flattened.

A. aureum is distinguished from the related Australonyx aquae in having a mandibular angular process extending more posteriorly than the mandibular condyle. The angular process of the former is also more robust in the former than the latter, and the degree of lateral convexity and medial concavity of the angular process is likewise greater in the former relative to the latter. The position of the mandibular canal's posterolateral opening is medial to the ascending ramus of the dentary in A. aureum but lateral to it in A. aquae. In A. aureum, the basal length of the coronoid process is significantly in excess of the distance between the posterior margins of the ramus and mandibular condyle; in A. aquae, however, these distances are roughly comparable.

== Classification ==
Ahytherium is a genus of the extinct family Megalonychidae within the suborder Folivora and the superorder Xenarthra. The Megalonychidae represent a very diverse group. The closest relatives of the Megalonychidae are the Megatheriidae and the Nothrotheriidae. The former include the largest known representatives of the sloths, the latter consist of rather smaller members of the sloths. All three families together are relegated to the superfamily of Megatherioidea. Within the sloths, the Megalonychidae form a very old lineage, with the oldest known fossils dating to the Oligocene of Patagonia. Characteristic features are found in the caniniform and incisiform design of the anterior tooth in each case, as well as in the molar-like (molariform) designed posterior teeth. The latter are characterized by two transverse ridges (bilophodont) on the occlusal surface, which points to a rather leaf-eating diet in the Megalonychidae. Unlike the Megatheriidae and the Nothrotheriidae, the hind foot is plantigrade in shape and not twisted, thus retaining its original shape. The Megalonychidae were once widespread, with fossil remains found in both South America and Central America, as well as in North America as far north as the Arctic. In a classic view based on skeletal anatomy comparisons-based view, the Megalonychidae originally included the sloths of the West Indies as well as the extant two-toed sloths of the genus Choloepus, which are now considered to belong to the superfamily Mylodontoidea. Molecular genetic However, studies together with protein analyses failed to establish closer relationships between these individual groups.

Much of the fossil material of Megalonychidae is fragmentary and largely incomplete. The systematic Relationships of the individual representatives of the group could be worked out therefore so far only insufficiently. However, due to the richness of forms, different lines of development can be traced. One includes largely South American representatives such as Megistonyx or Ahytherium and Ortotherium, respectively, another consists of the North American forms Megalonyx and Pliometanastes (here, since based on skeletal features, also Caribbean sloths such as Megalocnus or Neocnus). Currently, however, it is not possible to determine direct ancestors for the North American representatives of Megalonychidae. Consequently, their relationship to the South American forms is rather unknown.

Below is a phylogenetic tree of the Megalonychidae, based on the work of Stinnesbeck and colleagues (2021).

- Megalonychidae
  - - Eucholoeps
    - - - Pliometanastes
        - - Pliomorphus
          - - - - Megalocnus
                - Parocnus
              - - Neocnus
                - - Acratocnus
                  - Choloepus
            - - - Megistonyx
                - Ahytherium
              - - - Nohochichak
                  - - Meizonyx
                    - Zacatzontli
                - Xibalbaonyx
      - Megalonyx
  - Megalonychotherium

== Paleobiology ==
Ahytherium must have been a large, rather slow-moving terrestrial sloth that could defend itself from carnivores with its powerful claws. The flattened shape of the tail suggests that Ahytherium might have been a good swimmer. It is suggested to have been a mixed feeder (both browsing and grazing).

=== Palaeopathology ===
Anatomopathological examination of a lesion on a pathological A. aureus specimen from the Brazilian Intertropical Region suggests that it suffered from osteochondritis dissecans.

== See also ==
- Thalassocnus
