= Urumacocnus =

Urumacocnus Temporal range: Late Miocene (Mayoan-Huayquerian) ~11.6–5.3 Ma

Scientific classification
- Domain: Eukaryota
- Kingdom: Animalia
- Phylum: Chordata
- Class: Mammalia
- Order: Pilosa
- Family: †Megalonychidae
- Genus: †Urumacocnus; Rincón et al., 2019
- Species: †U. urbanii

Binomial name
- †Urumacocnus urbanii Rincón et al., 2019

Extinct genus of ground sloths

Urumacocnus is an extinct genus of megalonychid sloth that lived during the Miocene in Venezuela. The genus contains one known species, Urumacocnus urbanii. Fossils have been found in the Urumaco Formation of Venezuela.

== Etymology ==
The generic name, Urumacocnus, is derived from the Urumaco Formation in which its fossils have been found in, and -ocnus, which means "hesitating" or "lazy", which is commonly used to name extinct sloths. The specific name honours Franco Urbani, for his important contributions to Venezuelan geology.

== Description ==
Urumacocnus is a relatively small sized megalonychid sloth that shares a combination of diagnostic features such as a round femur shaft, a straight femur shaft, albeit with the medial and lateral sides curved the femur head angle with respect to the femur shaft which is more than 160°, the femur neck being well demarcated, a valley between the femur head and the greater trochanter shallow; the femoral head present and larger than in other members of the family; the proximal end of the femur being broader than the distal end, greater trochanter longer than wide and smaller than the head, and entirely positioned distal to the femur head; and the lesser trochanter well developed, and caudally and medially directed.

== Taxonomy ==
- - Hapalops
  - Megalonychidae
    - Megalonychotherium
    - - Eucholoeops
      - - - - Pattersonocnus
            - Megalonyx
          - - Pliometanastes
            - - Ahytherium
              - Megistonyx
        - - Pliomorphus
          - - - Choloepus
              - - Urumacocnus
                - Acratocnus
            - - Neocnus
              - - Parocnus
                - Megalocnus
