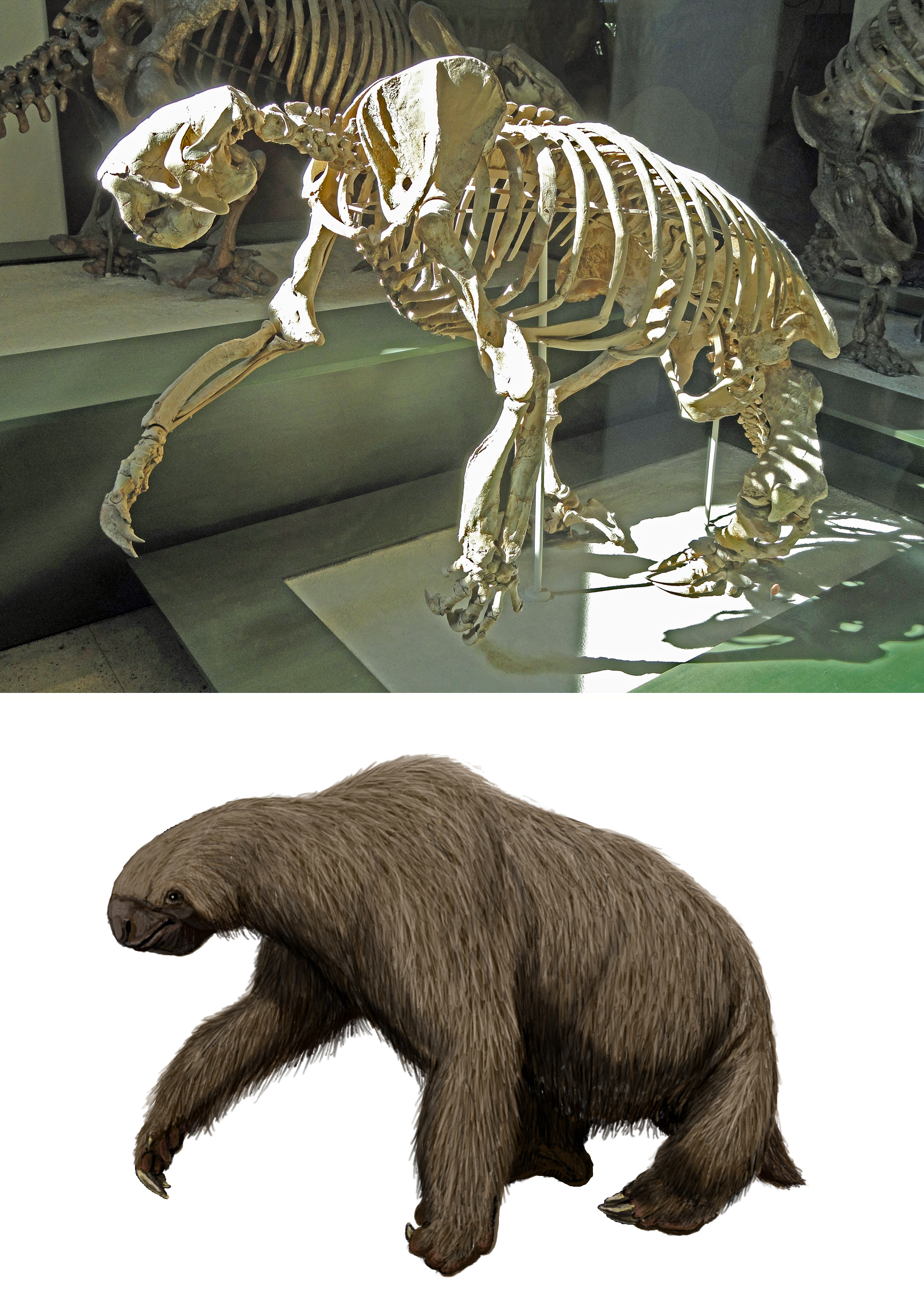
- Megalonyx wheatleyi skeleton and restoration

Scientific classification
- Kingdom: Animalia
- Phylum: Chordata
- Class: Mammalia
- Order: Pilosa
- Suborder: Folivora
- Superfamily: Megatherioidea
- Family: †Megalonychidae; Gervais, 1855

Type genus
- †Megalonyx Jefferson, 1799

Subgroups
- See text

= Megalonychidae =

Megalonychidae Temporal range: Early Oligocene-Early Holocene (Hemphillian-Rancholabrean) (NALMA) & Tinguirirican-Lujanian (SALMA) 35–0.009 Ma

Extinct family of sloths

Megalonychidae is an extinct family of sloths including the extinct Megalonyx. Megalonyx, which means "giant claw", is a widespread North American genus that lived past the close of the last (Wisconsin) glaciation, when many large mammal species died out. Remains have been found as far north as Alaska and the Yukon. Ongoing excavations at Tarkio Valley in southwest Iowa may reveal something of the familial life of Megalonyx. An adult was found in direct association with two juveniles of different ages, suggesting that adults cared for young of different generations.

Megalonychidae, along with all other mainland ground sloths became extinct in North and South America around the end of the Late Pleistocene, approximately 12,000 years ago, as part of the Quaternary extinction event following the arrival of humans to the Americas.

Jefferson's ground sloth (Megalonyx jeffersoni) has a special place in modern paleontology, for Thomas Jefferson's "memoir" on Megalonyx, read before the American Philosophical Society of Philadelphia, on 10 March 1797, marked the beginning of vertebrate paleontology in North America. Jefferson's paper was published, with an accompanying description and illustrations of the Megalonyx fossils by Casper Wistar, in 1799. When Lewis and Clark set out, Jefferson instructed Meriwether Lewis to keep an eye out for ground sloths. He was hoping they would find some living in the Western range. Megalonyx jeffersonii was named after Thomas Jefferson in 1822.

== Evolution ==
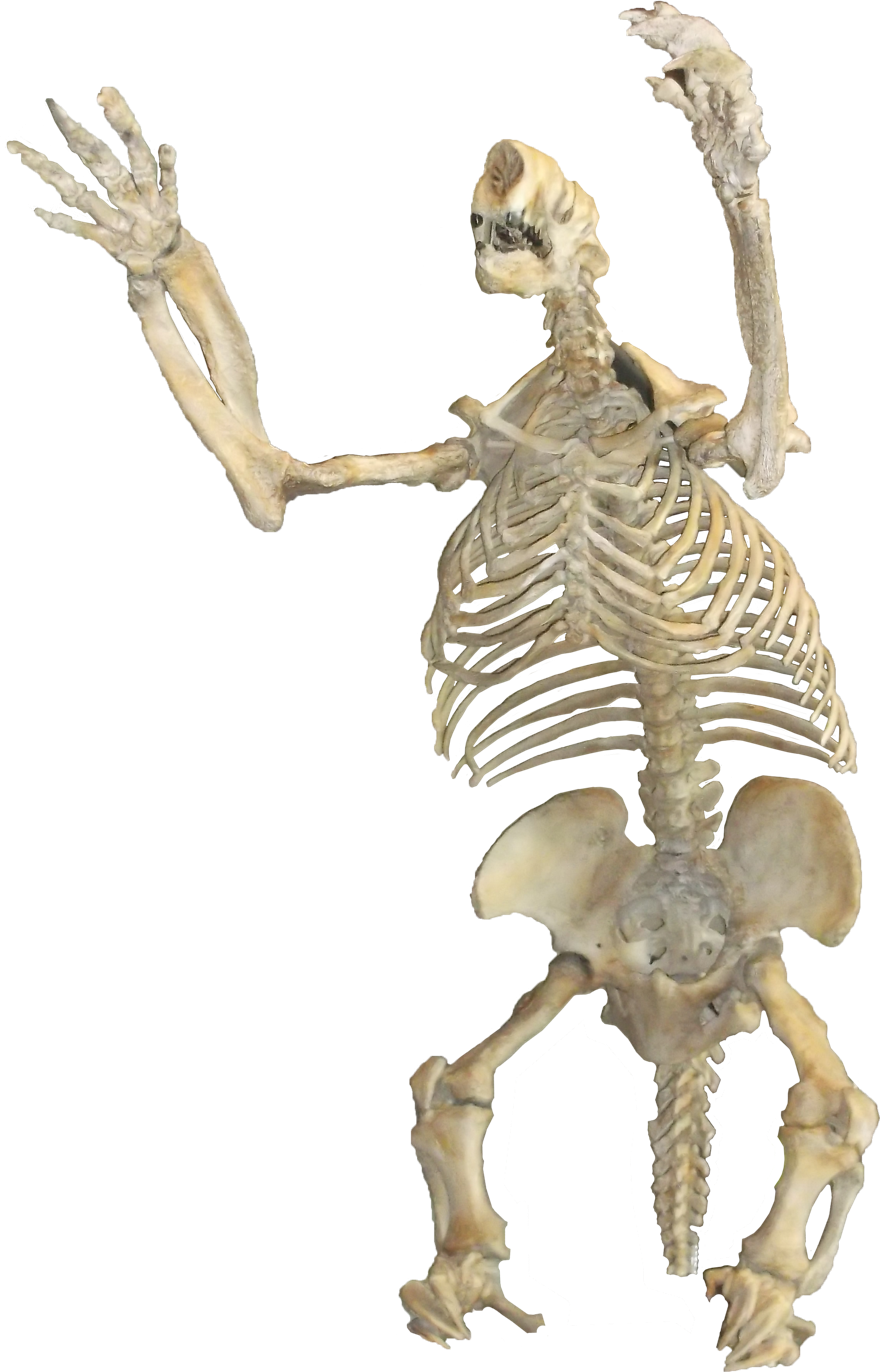
Megalonyx jeffersonii skeleton cast produced and distributed by Triebold Paleontology Incorporated

Megalonychids first appeared in the early Oligocene, about 35 million years (Ma) ago, in southern Argentina (Patagonia). There is, however, one possible find dating to the Eocene, about 40 Ma ago, on Seymour Island in Antarctica (which was then still connected to South America).

Members of the family first reached North America by island-hopping across the Central American Seaway, about 9 million years ago, prior to formation of the Isthmus of Panama about 2.7 million years ago (which led to the main pulse of the Great American Interchange).

Some megalonychid lineages increased in size as time passed. The first species of these were small and may have been partly tree-dwelling, whereas the Pliocene (about 5 to 2 million years ago) species were already approximately half the size of the huge Late Pleistocene Megalonyx jeffersonii from the last ice age. The earliest known North American megalonychid, Pliometanastes protistus, lived in Florida and the southern U.S. about 9 million years ago, and is believed to have been the predecessor of Megalonyx. Several species of Megalonyx have been named; in fact, a 2000 article by Harington et al. in Arctic claimed that "nearly every good specimen has been described as a different species". A broader perspective on the group, accounting for age, sex, individual and geographic differences, indicates that only three species are valid (M. leptostomus, M. wheatleyi, and M. jeffersonii) in the late Pliocene and Pleistocene of North America. Although work by McDonald lists five species.

It was formerly believed, based on morphological comparisons, that Greater Antilles sloths and extant arboreal two-toed sloths were part of this family. However, molecular results based on sequences from collagen and mitochondrial DNA have shown that the former represent a basal branch of the sloth radiation, while the latter are more closely related to mylodontid sloths. The megalonychids plus nothrotheriid and megatheriid sloths, together with living three-toed sloths, make up the sloth superfamily Megatherioidea.

== Taxonomy ==
The following sloth family phylogenetic tree is based on collagen and mitochondrial DNA sequence data (see Fig. 4 of Presslee et al., 2019).

- Folivora
  - † Megalocnidae (Caribbean sloths)
  - - - Mylodontoidea
        - † Scelidotheriidae
        - - † Mylodontidae
          - Choloepodidae (two-toed sloths)
      - Megatherioidea
        - - † Megalonychidae
            † Megalonyx jeffersoni
          - Bradypodidae (three-toed sloths)
            - Bradypus torquatus
            - - Bradypus pygmaeus
              - - Bradypus tridactylus
                - Bradypus variegatus
        - - † Nothrotheriidae
            † Nothrotheriops shastensis
          - † Megatheriidae
            † Megatherium americanum

A morphological tree of Megalonychidae, based on the work of Stinnesbeck and colleagues (2021). (Note that this tree does not conform to genetic studies, as it includes the Caribbean sloths Neocnus, Parocnus Megalocnus and Arcatocnus which have been placed in the separate family Megalocnidae, well as the two toed sloths (Choloepus), which are placed in the clade Mylodontoidea).

- Megalonychidae
  - Megalonychotherium
  - - Eucholoeops
    - - Megalonyx
      - - Pliometanastes
        - - Pliomorphus
          - - - - Megalocnus
                - Parocnus
              - - Neocnus
                - - Acratocnus
                  - Choloepus
            - - - Ahytherium
                - Megistonyx
              - - Xibalbaonyx
                - - Nohochichak
                  - - Meizonyx
                    - Zacatzontli

Total evidence phylogeny after Tejada et al. 2023.

- Megalonychidae
  - Megalonychotherium
  - - Pliometanastes
    - - Megalonyx
      - - Australonyx
        - - Ahytherium
          - Megistonyx

=== Genera ===
- †Deseadognathus
- †Hapalops?
- †Hyperleptus?
- †Mesopotamocnus
- †Paulocnus
- †Proplatyarthrus
- †Urumacocnus
- †Ortotheriinae
  - †Diodomus
  - †Eucholoeops
  - †Hapaloides
  - †Megalonychotherium
  - †Ortotherium
  - †Paranabradys
  - †Proschismotherium
  - †Pseudortotherium
  - †Torcellia
- †Megalonychinae
  - †Ahytherium (Late Pleistocene, Brazil)
  - †Australonyx (Late Pleistocene, Brazil)
  - †Megalonychops
  - †Megalonyx (Pliocene-Late Pleistocene, North America)
  - †Megistonyx (Late Pleistocene, Venezuela)
  - †Meizonyx (Middle-Late Pleistocene Central America, Mexico)
  - †Nohochichak (Late Pleistocene, Mexico)
  - †Pliometanastes
  - †Pliomorphus
  - †Protomegalonyx
  - †Sinclairia
  - †Xibalbaonyx (Late Pleistocene, Mexico, potentially Venezuela)
  - †Zacatzontli
