= Nohochichak =

Nohochichak Temporal range: Late Pleistocene (Rancholabrean) ~0.036–0.012 Ma

Scientific classification
- Kingdom: Animalia
- Phylum: Chordata
- Class: Mammalia
- Order: Pilosa
- Family: †Megalonychidae
- Genus: †Nohochichak; McDonald et al. 2017
- Species: †N. xibalbahkah

Binomial name
- †Nohochichak xibalbahkah McDonald et al. 2017

Extinct genus of ground sloths

Nohochichak is an extinct genus of megalonychid ground sloth from the Late Pleistocene (Rancholabrean) of the Yucatan Peninsula in Mexico.

== Discovery and taxonomy ==
The only known specimens were discovered in the underwater cave system of Hoyo Negro in Quintana Roo, consisting of a partial skull, mandible and some postcranial remains. It was found to be closer to other Mexican Sloth taxa, like Xibalbaonyx, Meizonyx and Zacatzontli than to the North American Megalonyx.

== Description ==
In life, it is estimated to have been around 987 kg in weight. It probably lived in a dry landscape.
