= Mesopotamocnus =

Mesopotamocnus Temporal range: Late Miocene (Huayquerian) ~6.3 Ma

Scientific classification
- Domain: Eukaryota
- Kingdom: Animalia
- Phylum: Chordata
- Class: Mammalia
- Order: Pilosa
- Family: †Megalonychidae
- Genus: †Mesopotamocnus; Brandoni et al., 2014
- Species: †M. brevirostrum

Binomial name
- †Mesopotamocnus brevirostrum (Bordas, 1942)

Synonyms
- Ortotherium brevirostrum (Bordas, 1942)

Extinct genus of ground sloths

Mesopotamocnus is an extinct genus of megalonychid ground sloth that lived during the Late Miocene in what is now Argentina. Fossils have been found in the Ituzaingó Formation of Argentina.

== Etymology ==
The generic name, Mesopotamocnus, is derived from "Mesopotam", from its geographic provenance, Mesopotamia, which in turn means "between rivers" in Greek, and -ocnus, meaning "lazy" or "slow" which is commonly used to name extinct sloths. The specific name, brevirostrum, means "short snout".

== Taxonomy ==
Mesopotamocnus (as "Ortotherium" brevirostrum") was originally assigned to the Nothrotheriidae however, the genus Ortotherium is currently considered to be a megalonychid, without being assigned to a particular clade such as Ortotheriinae, Megalocninae or Megalonychinae. Furthermore, most of the genera and species that were traditionally considered nothrotheres are now considered members of the Nothrotheriinae, such as Nothrotherium, Nothropus, Pronothrotherium, Nothrotheriops, and Mionothropus, or as basal Megatherioidea such as Hapalops, Schismotherium, and Pelecyodon.
