= Hapaloides =

Hapaloides Temporal range: Early Miocene (Colhuehuapian) ~21.0–17.5 Ma

Scientific classification
- Kingdom: Animalia
- Phylum: Chordata
- Class: Mammalia
- Order: Pilosa
- Suborder: Folivora
- Family: †Megalonychidae
- Subfamily: †Ortotheriinae
- Genus: †Hapaloides; Ameghino, 1902

Type species
- †Hapaloides ignavus Ameghino, 1902

Other species
- †H. laevisculus Ameghino, 1902; †H. ponderosus Ameghino, 1902

Extinct genus of ground sloth

Hapaloides is an extinct genus of ground sloth of the family Megalonychidae, endemic to Argentina during the Early Miocene. It lived from 21.0 mya to 17.5 mya, existing (as a genus) for approximately 3.5 million years.

Found in the Colhuehuapian-aged Colpodon Beds of Argentina, three species are known: H. ignavus (the type species), H. laevisculus and H. ponderosus, all named by Florentino Ameghino in 1902. H. ignavus is known from a partial cranium that is smaller than that of Hapalops rectangularis, which it was compared to.

Ameghino in 1902 placed Hapaloides in the Megatheriidae, alongside Proschismotherium, which was its sister taxon, while more recent taxonomic reviews place Hapaloides within Megalonychidae.
