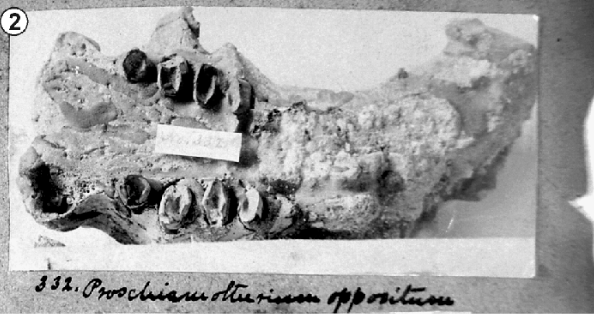
- Holotype jaw

Scientific classification
- Kingdom: Animalia
- Phylum: Chordata
- Class: Mammalia
- Order: Pilosa
- Suborder: Folivora
- Family: †Megalonychidae
- Genus: †Proschismotherium; Ameghino, 1902
- Species: †P. oppositum

Binomial name
- †Proschismotherium oppositum Ameghino, 1902

= Proschismotherium =

Proschismotherium Temporal range: Early Miocene, 17.5–16.3 Ma Santacrucian

Extinct genus of ground sloth

Proschismotherium is an extinct genus of ground sloth of the family Megalonychidae, endemic to Argentina during the Early Miocene. It lived from 17.5 mya — 16.3 mya, existing (as a genus) for approximately 1.2 million years. The type, and only, species, P. oppositum, was named in 1902 by Florentino Ameghino based on a single specimen found in the Santacrucian-aged Colpodon Beds of Argentina. Ameghino in 1902 placed Proschismotherium in the Megatheriidae, alongside Hapaloides, which was its sister taxon.

The holotype jaw was compared to that of Schismotherium fractum and was found to be roughly the same size, indicating that Proschismotherium weighed roughly 45 kilograms (99 lb) and grew up to 1 metre (3.3 ft); the size estimate was loosely based on Hapalops and also Schismotherium.
