= Meizonyx =

Meizonyx Temporal range: Pleistocene

Scientific classification
- Kingdom: Animalia
- Phylum: Chordata
- Class: Mammalia
- Infraclass: Placentalia
- Order: Pilosa
- Suborder: Folivora
- Family: †Megalonychidae
- Genus: †Meizonyx; Webb & Perrigo, 1985
- Species: †M. salvadorensis

Binomial name
- †Meizonyx salvadorensis Webb & Perrigo, 1985

Extinct genus of ground sloth

Meizonyx is an extinct genus of megalonychid ground sloth known from Pleistocene deposits in El Salvador and southern Mexico. The genus contains a single species, Meizonyx salvadorensis, which was described in 1985 on the basis of a mandible discovered at Barranca del Sisimico, El Salvador. Further remains recovered from Rio Tomayate in El Salvador have been attributed to the species and are considered to date to the Middle Pleistocene. In 2021, two partial skeletons were described from Late Pleistocene deposits within the Sistema Huautla cave in Oxaca, Mexico. Radiometric dating placed one of the specimens at approximately 12,562 ± 130 years Before Present. It is considered closely related to Xibalbaonyx. In size, it was comparable to or slightly larger than Megalonyx jeffersonii. It is thought to have inhabited relatively mountainous environments.

== See also ==
- Quaternary extinction event
