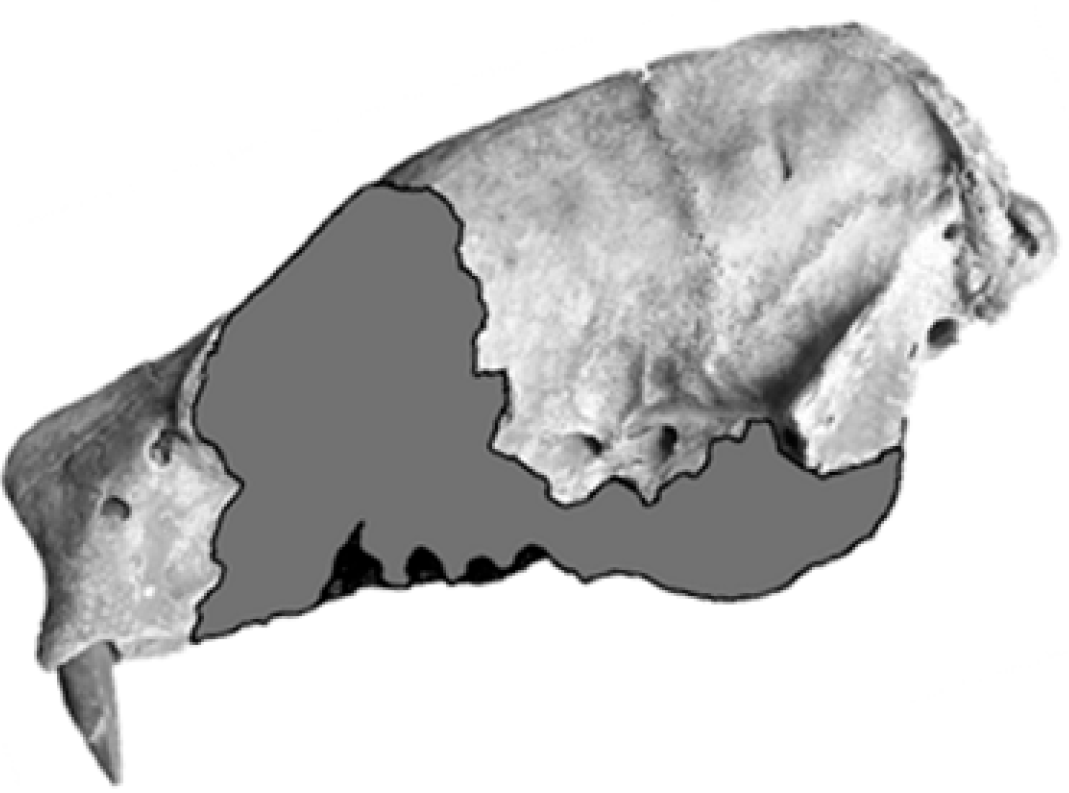
- Skull

Scientific classification
- Kingdom: Animalia
- Phylum: Chordata
- Class: Mammalia
- Order: Pilosa
- Family: †Megalonychidae
- Genus: †Australonyx; De Iuliis et al, 2009
- Species: †A. aquae

Binomial name
- †Australonyx aquae De Iuliis et al, 2009

= Australonyx =

Australonyx Temporal range: Late Pleistocene (Lujanian)

Extinct genus of sloths

Australonyx is an extinct genus of ground sloths, endemic to South America during the Late Pleistocene. It was found in Brazil.

Poço Azul (Brazil)

== Discovery ==
The holotype specimen was recovered from Poço Azul, an underwater cave system in Nova Redenção, Bahia state. (The same cave also yielded remains of another extinct sloth species, Ahytherium.) The specimen was well preserved, consisting of both the front and back half of the skull (but missing the midsection), the mandible, most of the spine, and some elements from the limbs. Additionally, a nearly identical almost complete skull from Rondônia can be referred to this species.

== Ecology ==
Australonyx is suggested to have been a mixed feeder (both browsing and grazing).
