= Hells Bells (cave formations) =

Underwater cave formation

El Zapote
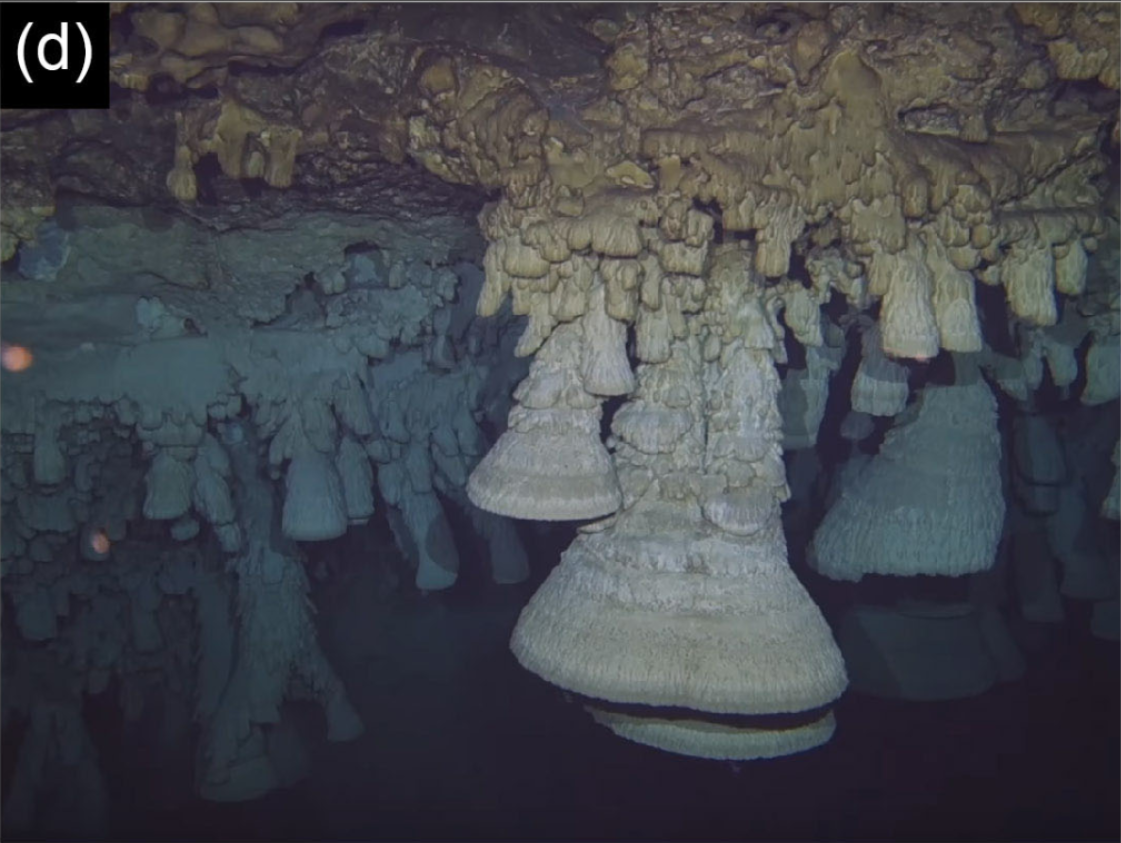
- Hells Bells in El Zapote Cenote

- Location within Mexico
- Coordinates: 20°51′28″N 87°07′36″W
- Depth: 54 metres (177 ft)

Hells Bells are hollow bell- or cone-shaped structures of carbonate that can reach lengths of 2 metres (6 ft 7 in). They are found underwater in El Zapote cenote in Quintana Roo, Mexico, on the Yucatan Peninsula; similar formations exist in other caves. In a certain depth range, such structures cover the entire surface of the cave including submerged tree trunks and other Hells Bells, although they never touch each other.

The Hells Bells are speleothems that appear to have formed through incompletely understood complex interplays between water of the cave, microorganisms living in the cave, and the surface of the Hells Bells. The name refers both to their shape and their environment, and also to a song of the same name.

== Name ==
The name is a reference both to the shape of the structures and the lightless and toxic environment they are found in, and also to the song "Hells Bells" by AC/DC, and was proposed by cave divers. In Spanish they are called Campanas del Infierno. Another name is Piñas de Yucatan, owing to their pinecone-like shape.

== Appearance and site ==
The Hells Bells are found underwater at depths of 29–35 metres (95–115 ft) and have the forms of conical, hollow protrusions with shapes resembling bells, lampshades, tongues, trumpets, or trunks that hang off a surface and widen downward like a cone or bell. They cover the entire surface area of the cave, including larger specimens and tree trunks; nested forms are also common, but there is always some separation to adjacent surfaces away from the attachment point. Their surface is covered with irregularities such as granules, knobs, nubs, protrusions, pustules, and swellings and sometimes by flowstone produced by exposure to air; they are generally not smooth. Some of these structures are "bubble trails"; these are channels or clefts carved into limestone by carbon dioxide bubbles.

Hells Bells are usually elliptical or circular, with their lower surface strictly horizontal and usually with a lateral gap that gives them a horseshoe outline; this opening always faces the walls of the cave and in general the Bells tend to grow away from obstacles. The angle at which a Bell opens is usually the same over its entire length. They are large: their length can exceed 2 metres (6 ft 7 in) and their width can reach 0.8 metres (2 ft 7 in), while their walls are up to 3 centimetres (1.2 in) thick. The Bells that formed on tree trunks are smaller and have shapes resembling balconies or consoles. In cross-cuts, the Bells are layered, with white to yellow to brown layers that are formed in part by blade-like calcite crystals that can reach 1 centimetre (0.39 in) length and in part by non-crystalline layers. Manganese oxide forms brown coats on some shallower specimens.

Hells Bells were originally found in the El Zapote sinkhole (cenote), a 54-metre-deep (177 ft) water-filled bottle- or hourglass-shaped cavern, more specifically in its 60–100 metres (200–330 ft) wide cavern. At the bottom of the cavern lies a debris mound; strong rain can sweep material into the sinkhole, including some submerged tree trunks that are up to 8 metres (26 ft) long and leaves and other plant remains that cover the floor of the sinkhole. A shaft rises to the surface to the actual sinkhole and is about 8.7 by 10.8 metres (29 ft × 35 ft) wide there, while the submerged cavern reaches a width of over 100 metres (330 ft); there is no detectable flow of water in the deeper cavern. Sinkholes such as El Zapote are common in the wider region and form through the collapse of caves. Similar bells have been found in other cenotes of the region, such as Xkolac, Maravilla and Tortugas.

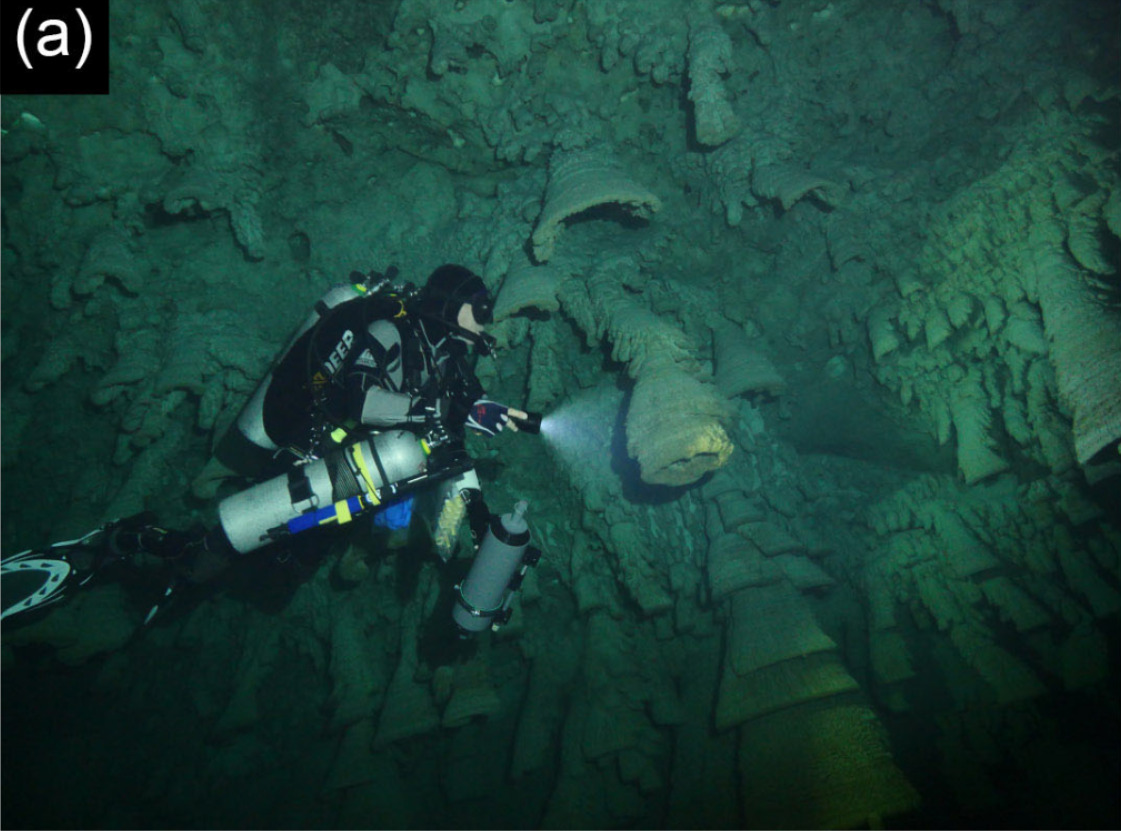
A diver investigating the Hells Bells

Their existence has been known to the local cave-diving community for a long time, and there is a visitor centre at El Zapote where a 1.8-metre-long (5.9 ft) specimen taken from the cave floor is exhibited. The Hells Bells were researched by Wolfgang Stinnesbeck from the University of Heidelberg who was investigating caves for traces of human civilization and who authored the first academic work on them.

== Location ==
El Zapote and the Hells Bells are in southeastern Mexico, in the state of Quintana Roo 26 kilometres (16 mi) west of Puerto Morelos and 36 kilometres (22 mi) south of Cancun; the sinkhole lies c. 10 kilometres (6.2 mi) from a road that connects Mexican Federal Highway 180 and Mexican Federal Highway 307. El Zapote is on the Yucatan Peninsula, which contains one of the largest karst-cave systems in the world, including 370 caves in Quintana Roo alone; the total length of all these caves probably exceeds 7,000 kilometres (4,300 mi) and some individual systems are over 350 kilometres (220 mi) long.

== Formation processes ==
Carbonate deposits (carbonate speleothems) in caves appear to usually form when evaporation or carbon dioxide escaping from water cause calcite to become saturated, which then precipitates and forms deposits. Underwater carbonate deposits are also known however and may form through biological and physical-chemical processes. The Hells Bells appear to belong to this underwater type, as there is little evidence of exposure to air on them, and water levels in the cave appear to have always exceeded the depths at which the Hells Bells developed.

Neighbouring sinkholes also contain Hells Bells-like structures, but they are smaller than these at El Zapote, while other cave systems on Yucatan and apparently elsewhere in the world have no such structures; the reason for their absence elsewhere is unknown although particular hydrological conditions are likely necessary for their formation. So-called "folia" carbonate deposits, to which the Hells Bells belong, are however widespread around the world.

The development of a Hells Bell appears to begin in the form of a hemispherical bud, which begins to grow conically downward and acquires the hollow cone shape once it has reached a length of 3–4 centimetres (1.2–1.6 in) and a width of 4 centimetres (1.6 in), when calcite accumulation on the inner side stops. The growth of the Bells was unsteady, with slowdowns and stops alternating with rapid growth but within an overall stable environment where the transport of chemical substances through water is mainly due to diffusion, owing to the lack of water currents. Radiometric dating of some Hells Bells specimens indicates that they grew during the middle and late Holocene, beginning over 5,200 years ago, through to the present day; the cave was already flooded at that time.

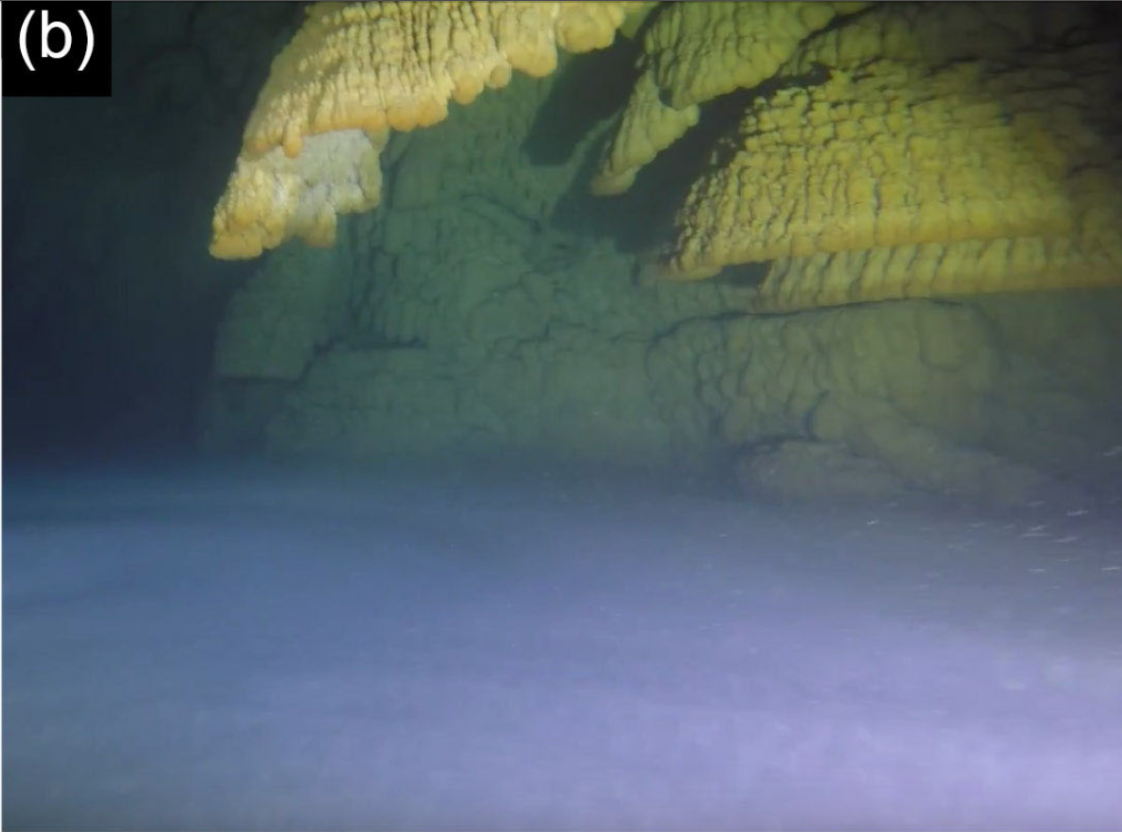
Hells Bells over a layer of turbid water

The cave systems of Yucatan are partly flooded by salty groundwater derived from seawater and fresh groundwater from precipitation; the freshwater and saltwater are separated by a mixed layer (halocline). Sinkholes known as cenotes connect the cave systems to the atmosphere; often older cenotes contain turbid, stagnating water with oxygen-rich and oxygen-poor layers. That includes El Zapote, where the oxygen content drops in the halocline to anoxia, while the freshwater layer contains oxygen; the saltwater layer may or may not contain oxygen. In El Zapote, the Hells Bells have developed at the margin between the halocline and the freshwater layer above; they are not found elsewhere in the water column where calcite appears to dissolve. Their downward growth is constrained by the halocline. The region of the water column where they develop appears to coincide with the presence of a redox boundary produced by microbial sulfate and nitrate metabolism that moves up and down in response to precipitation variations (such as hurricanes) and resulting changes in the water supply to El Zapote; the slow downward phase of movement may induce the growth of the Hells Bells. Identifying the chemical traits that correspond to Hells Bells formation is made difficult by the scarcity of hydrogeochemical data.

=== Biology and origin ===
Both El Zapote and the Hells Bells structures contain a diverse ecosystem of microorganisms, including archea and bacteria and with chemolithotrophic, heterotrophic, and mixotrophic species. The microbes metabolize hydrogen, various nitrogen compounds, oxygen, and various sulfur compounds. The metabolism of these microorganisms may influence the growth of the Hells Bells by consuming carbon dioxide and thus facilitating the deposition of calcite by metabolizing nitrogen from alkaline to acidic to neutral compounds under the influence of sulfur and nitrogen redox processes, forming biofilms on the surface of the Bells and by producing organic polymers that can concentrate calcium.

The Hells Bells may have a biological origin; microbial activity may produce the lamination of the deposits, which resemble these of some freshwater stromatolites. It is difficult to conclusively link such calcite deposits to biological activity. Potentially, the oxidation of sulfur compounds in the oxygen-containing water layers acidifies them and thus stops the growth of the Bells, as would the consumption of dissolved calcite by neighbouring Bells; this might explain why they grow away from obstacles. However, the formation process of the Hells Bells is highly speculative and mostly non-biological mechanisms are also possible. The erosion of limestone by ascending carbon dioxide containing bubbles, and the precipitation of limestone from the resulting calcium-saturated water has been proposed as an alternative process. According to this theory, limestone precipitates at the edge of a bubble trapped under some obstacle, initiating the development of a Hells Bell. Fluctuations in the halocline would in turn chemically modify the limestone, producing a substrate for further limestone precipitation.

Because the growth of Hells Bells is so heavily constrained by the layering of the water, their depth and their growth history may be used to infer the position of the halocline, which in turn reflects former precipitation rates; this could be used to infer past climate. Additionally, the dark, submerged ecosystem of the Hells Bells may be used as an analogy to conditions on the early Earth when ionizing and UV radiation constrained the development of life.

The El Zapote cenote is also the place where the ground sloth genus Xibalbaonyx was first discovered; ground sloths during the Neogene were a diverse group of American megafauna that are poorly recorded in fossils from Central America. The remains of the animal specimen were found on the floor of the sinkhole.
