= Nova Redenção =

Municipality of Bahia, Brazil

Coordinates: 12°49′08″S 41°04′15″W

- Municipality
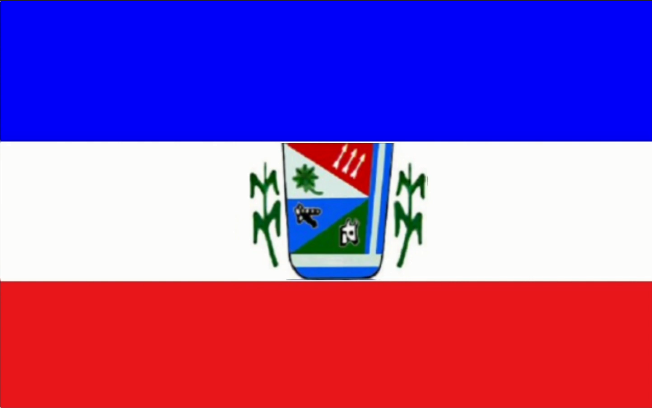
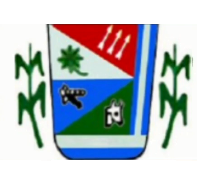
- Flag Coat of arms
- Interactive map of Nova Redenção
- Country: Brazil
- Region: Nordeste
- State: Bahia

Population (2020)
  - Total: 9,123
- Time zone: UTC−3 (BRT)

Nova Redenção is a municipality in the state of Bahia in the North-East Region of Brazil.

== See also ==
- List of municipalities in Bahia
