= Schismotherium =

Schismotherium Temporal range: Burdigalian

Scientific classification
- Kingdom: Animalia
- Phylum: Chordata
- Class: Mammalia
- Order: Pilosa
- Suborder: Folivora
- Superfamily: Megatherioidea
- Genus: †Schismotherium; Ameghino, 1887

Type species
- Schismotherium fractum Ameghino, 1887

Other species
- Schismotherium binum Ameghino, 1887; Schismotherium rectangularis Ameghino, 1887; Schismotherium splendens Ameghino, 1887

Extinct genus of sloths

Schismotherium is an extinct genus of megatherioid sloth that lived during the Santacrucian South American land mammal age of the Miocene epoch.

== Description ==
Schismotherium can be distinguished from the closely related Pelecyodon by a number of apomorphies. The dorsal region of the frontal bone of Schismotherium has a small postorbital process, along with anteriorly concave sutures with the nasal and maxilla. Schismotherium has very strong temporal lines characterised by a deep concavity separating them, in contrast to the slight concavity found in Pelecyodon.

== Taxonomy ==
The type specimen of Schismotherium fractum was lost since its description, leading to the specimen MACN-A 6445–6470 being designated as the neotype.

== Palaeobiology ==
Schismotherium had very good sound localisation capabilities and is suggested to have had good binocular vision, which may indicate that it was an arboreal animal. Its sensory capabilities may also be indicative of it being a social animal that used high-frequency short-range vocalisations such as predator alarms to communicate with other members of its family group or herd.
