= Pliometanastes =

Pliometanastes Temporal range: Late Miocene-Early Pliocene (Hemphillian) ~10.3–4.9 Ma

Scientific classification
- Domain: Eukaryota
- Kingdom: Animalia
- Phylum: Chordata
- Class: Mammalia
- Order: Pilosa
- Family: †Megalonychidae
- Subfamily: †Megalonychinae
- Genus: †Pliometanastes; Hirschfeld & Webb 1968

Species
- P. galushai Hirschfeld & Webb 1968; P. protistus Hirschfeld & Webb 1968 (type)

Extinct genus of ground sloths

Pliometanastes is an extinct genus of ground sloths of the family Megalonychidae endemic to North America during the Late Miocene epoch through very early Pliocene epoch (Hemphillian in the NALMA classification). Its fossils have been found in Costa Rica and across the southern United States from California to Florida.

== Description ==
Pliometanastes and Thinobadistes were the first of the giant sloths to appear in North America, the former around 9 million years ago. Both were in North America before the Panamanian Land Bridge formed around 2.7 million years ago, which led to the main pulse of the Great American Interchange. It is then reasonable to presume that the ancestors of Pliometanastes island-hopped across the Central American Seaway from South America, where ground sloths arose.

Pliometanastes gave rise to Megalonyx. Their closest extant relatives, based on molecular results (which clash with earlier conclusions derived from morphology) are the extant arboreal three-toed sloths (Bradypus).

P. protistus has been estimated to weigh 851 kg.

== Taxonomy ==
Pliometanastes was named by Hirschfeld and Webb (1968). Its type is Pliometanastes protistus. It was assigned to Megalonychidae by Hirschfeld and Webb (1968) and Carroll (1988).
