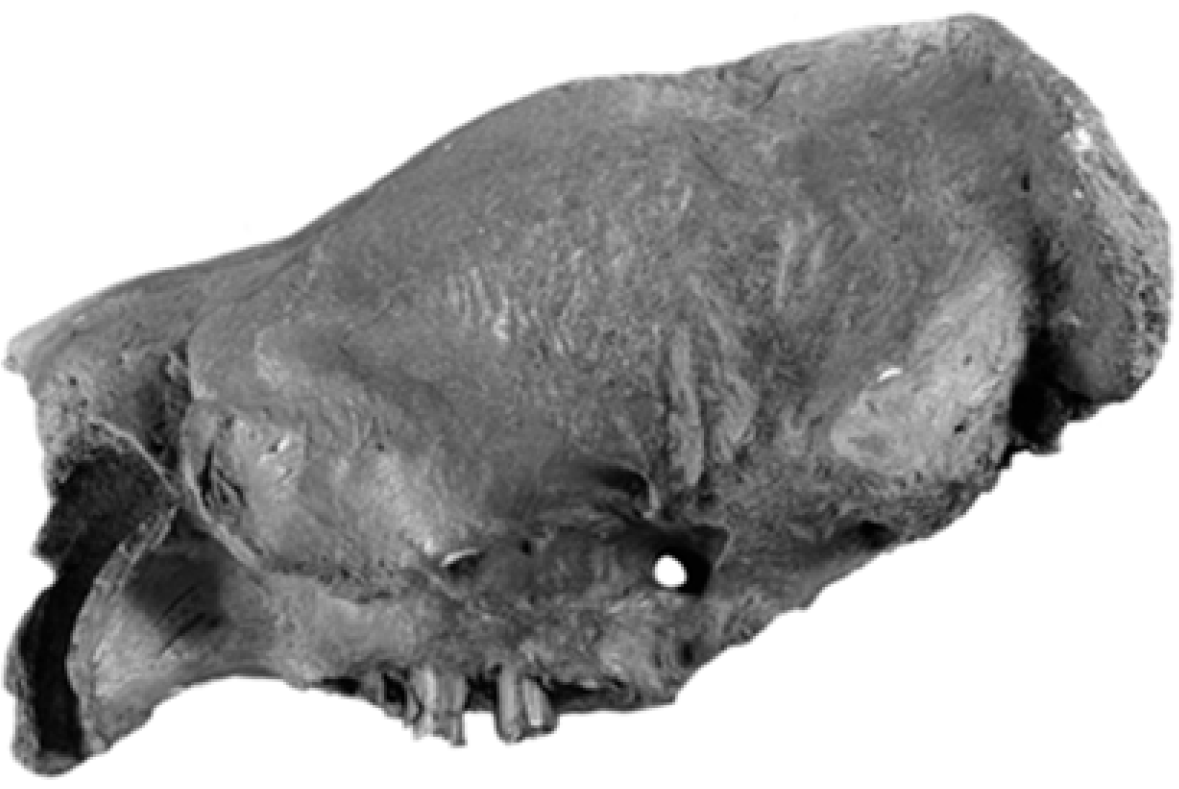
- Skull from holotype skeleton

Scientific classification
- Domain: Eukaryota
- Kingdom: Animalia
- Phylum: Chordata
- Class: Mammalia
- Order: Pilosa
- Family: †Megalonychidae
- Genus: †Megistonyx; Mcdonald et al., 2013
- Species: †M. oreobios

Binomial name
- †Megistonyx oreobios Mcdonald et al., 2013

= Megistonyx =

Megistonyx Temporal range: Late Pleistocene (Lujanian) ~0.02–0.011 Ma

Extinct genus of ground sloths

Megistonyx is an extinct genus of ground sloth endemic to South America during the Late Pleistocene (Lujanian). It is known from one skeleton collected in the Andes of Venezuela, and is closely related to Ahytherium.

== History of discovery ==
Location of the type locality in Venezuela

The holotype (and so far only known) specimen was found in a cave called Cueva de los Huesos (meaning "Bone Cave") on Cerro Pintado, a mountain found in the Serranía del Perijá range of the Andes, in the extreme northernmost part of the Sierra de Perijá National Park on the border between Venezuela and Colombia at an altitude of 3,200 metres (10,500 ft). The various known pieces of the skeleton were recovered in two expeditions to the cave in 1993 and 1997. The specimen was found in a scattered condition, with some bones being damaged, notably the skull was missing the left Squamosal bone. The specimen is currently known from the aforementioned skull, both a right and left humerus, a left ulna, two thoracic vertebrae, a complete rib and three rib fragments. There is apparently more of the specimen left in-situ in the cave. The age of the specimen was found to be approximately 17,300 Cal BP

== Distribution and habitat ==
The specimen is approximately 17,000 years old, this would put the specimen just after the retreat of the glaciers after the Last Glacial Maximum, which could indicate a cold climate. However, the specimen is associated with fossils of Neochoerus (an extinct capybara) Mazama (brocket deer) and Tayassu (peccary), which could indicate a warmer, perhaps savanna-like climate.
