= Xibalbaonyx =

Xibalbaonyx Temporal range: Late Pleistocene (Rancholabrean) ~0.016–0.010 Ma

Scientific classification
- Kingdom: Animalia
- Phylum: Chordata
- Class: Mammalia
- Order: Pilosa
- Suborder: Folivora
- Family: †Megalonychidae
- Subfamily: †Megalonychinae
- Genus: †Xibalbaonyx; Stinnesbeck et al. (2017)

Type species
- †Xibalbaonyx oviceps Stinnesbeck et al 2017

Other species
- †Xibalbaonyx microcaninus Stinnesbeck et al 2018; †Xibalbaonyx exinferis Stinnesbeck et al 2020

Extinct genus of ground sloth

Xibalbaonyx is an extinct genus of megalonychid ground sloth known from the Late Pleistocene of Mexico. Three species are recognized: X. oviceps and X. exiniferis from the Yucatán Peninsula and X. microcaninus from Jalisco. The genus name derives from Xibalba, the underworld in Maya mythology.

== Discovery and taxonomy ==
The holotype of X. oviceps consists of a mostly complete skeleton discovered in an underwater cave system, whereas X. microcaninus is known from a complete skull and mandible recovered from sediments deposited by the ancient Lake Jalisco. The overlapping cranial and mandibular remains exhibit notable morphological differences, sufficient to support their recognition as distinct species. A third species, X. exiniferis, was described in 2020 from an underwater cave in the Yucatán Peninsula, it is known from a fragmentary left mandibular ramus, an atlas, and a left humerus. In 2020, the postcranial remains of the X. oviceps holotype were described The following year, remains of a form closely related to Xibalbaonyx were reported from Pleistocene deposits in Cueva de Iglesitas near Caracas, Venezuela.

== Description ==
Xibalbaonyx oviceps was approximately 2 meters (6.6 ft) long and weighed around 200 kilograms (440 lb), with a similar body mass estimated for X. exiniferis. Its robust forelimbs were likely supported by well-developed musculature and possessed a broad range of movement. These features have been interpreted as adaptations for climbing, comparable to the abilities of similarly sized American black bears.
