= Central American Seaway =

Body of water

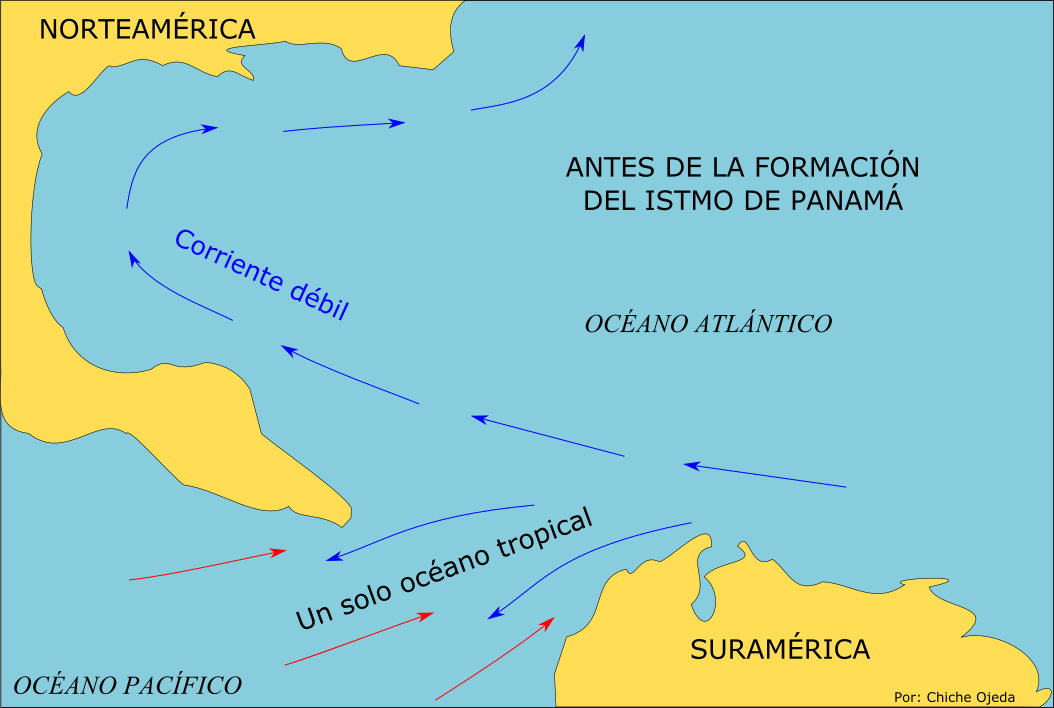
The Central American Seaway separated North America from South America

The Central American Seaway (also known as the Panamanic Seaway, Inter-American Seaway and Proto-Caribbean Seaway) was a prehistoric body of water that once connected the Pacific Ocean to the Atlantic Ocean, separating North America from South America. It formed during the Jurassic (200–154 Ma) during the initial breakup of the supercontinent Pangaea into Laurasia and Gondwana, forming a mediterranean sea between Panthalassa and the Tethys Ocean, and finally closed when the Isthmus of Panama was formed by volcanic activity in the late Pliocene (2.76–2.54 Ma). The modern-day remnants of the seaway are the Gulf of Mexico, Caribbean Sea and the Central Atlantic region around the Sargasso Sea.

The Great American Interchange, a faunal exchange that occurred after formation of the Isthmus of Panama bridged North and South America. Examples of migrant species in both Americas are shown.

The closure of the Central American Seaway had tremendous effects on oceanic circulation and the biogeography of the adjacent seas, isolating many species and triggering speciation and diversification of tropical and sub-tropical marine fauna. The inflow of nutrient-rich water of deep Pacific origin into the Caribbean was blocked, and so local species had to adapt to an environment of lower productivity. It had an even larger impact on terrestrial life. The seaway had isolated South America for much of the Cenozoic, which allowed the evolution of a wholly unique diverse mammalian fauna there. When it closed, a faunal exchange with North America ensued and led to the extinction of many of the native South American forms.

== Evidence ==
The evidence for when the Central American landmass emerged and the closing of the Central American Seaway can be divided into three categories. The first is the direct geologic observation of crustal thickening and submarine deposits in Central America. The second is the Great American Interchange of vertebrates between North and South America which required a continuous land bridge across the two areas for the organisms to travel along with a climate that was very different from the climate today. Lastly is the development of differences in marine assemblages and their isotopic signatures in the Caribbean from those in the Pacific. The Central American Seaway was closed by the elevating of the Isthmus of Panama which is proposed to have occurred 3.5 Ma. The closing of the Central American Seaway is also supported by the evolution of taxa on different sides of the isthmus along with the different histories of the oceans on either side of the isthmus. The first closure and the final closure remain a matter for debate.

1. Direct geologic observation of crustal thickening and submarine deposits in Central America
  - It is postulated that the geological collision started about 25 Ma, the deep ocean connections had ceased by between 12 and 9.2 Ma, and the final shallow temporary connection terminated at the latest by 2.45 Ma.
  - The earliest recent literature date for first closure is 15 Ma.
2. Great American Interchange
  - The first exchanges (land) and separation of species (sea) took place by 20 Ma, but genetic drift data seems to indicate that surface ocean connections may have existed of the order of 1 Ma.
3. Development of differences in marine assemblages and their isotopic signatures in the Caribbean from those in the Pacific
  - The saline and carbon data are fairly suggestive for a range of surface water interface loss between 4.6 and 4.2 Ma.

== Consequences ==
The closing of the seaway allowed a major migration of land mammals between North and South America, known as the Great American Interchange. That allowed species of mammals such as cats, canids, horses, elephants, and camels to migrate from North America to South America, and porcupines, ground sloths, glyptodonts and terror birds made the reverse migration. There is much controversy about glacial and interglacial climates in South America. Research shows that vegetation in most of the Amazon basin has changed very little since glacial times, but it is believed there was more savanna present during that period. A closed seaway would have led to a very different North Atlantic Ocean circulation, but it impacted the surrounding atmospheric temperatures, which in turn affected the glacial cycle. The emergence of the isthmus caused a reflection of the westward-flowing North Equatorial Current northward and enhanced the northward-flowing Gulf Stream. The Pacific coast of South America would have cooled as the input of warm water from the Caribbean was cut off. That trend is thought to have caused the extinction of the marine sloths of the area.

The closure of the seaway led to an increased poleward salt and heat transport, which strengthened the North Atlantic thermohaline circulation 2.95–2.82 Ma. That in turn increased the moisture supply to Arctic latitudes, which contributed to both Arctic continental glaciation and sea ice formation. With the aid of the orbitally-paced extension of Gelasian ice sheets, this eventually led to the Quaternary ice age.

== See also ==
- Atlantic meridional overturning circulation – System of surface and deep currents in the Atlantic Ocean
- Great American Interchange – Paleozoographic event resulting from the formation of the Isthmus of Panama
- North Atlantic Deep Water – Deep water mass formed in the North Atlantic Ocean
- Paleoceanography – Study of the oceans in the geologic past
