= Zacatzontli =

God of the road during the day in Aztec mythology

Zacatzontli, Borgia Codex, he has an eagle as sun's symbol guide

Zacatzontli, in Aztec mythology, is the god of the road during the day.

Zacatzontli has an eagle as a guide, a staff in his left hand, and a bag full of quetzals in his right hand. He can be a protector of merchants, thus equating him with the Mayan god Ek Chuáj. Unusually, Zacatzontli does not have a headdress, only a feather.

His name could mean "Lord of the Road" or "His Road, The Lord", although the former seems more likely.

== See also ==
- List of Aztec gods
- Aztec religion
