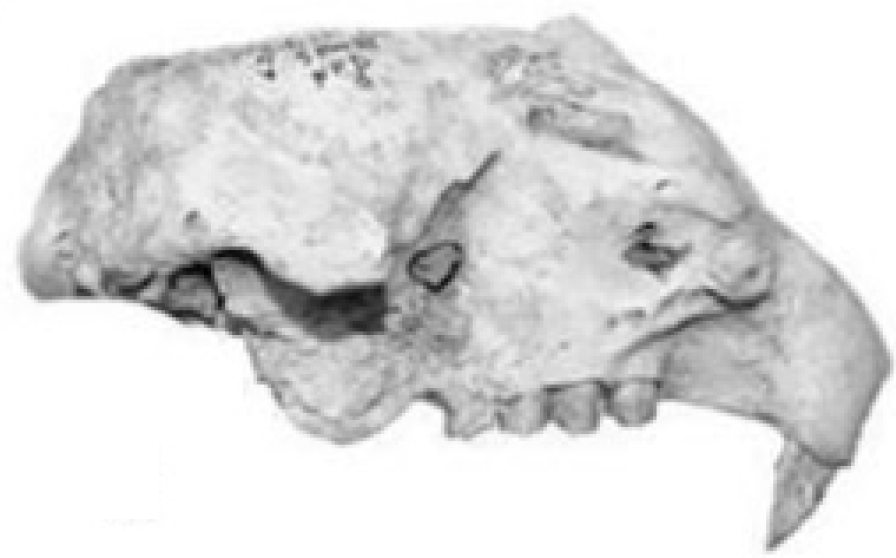
- Neocnus comes skull

Scientific classification
- Kingdom: Animalia
- Phylum: Chordata
- Class: Mammalia
- Order: Pilosa
- Suborder: Folivora
- Family: †Megalocnidae
- Genus: †Neocnus

Species
- †N. comes; †N. dousman; †N. gliriformis; †N. major; †N. toupiti

= Neocnus =

Neocnus Temporal range: Pleistocene to Holocene

Extinct genus of ground sloth

Neocnus is an extinct genus of megalocnid sloth, whose species ranged across Cuba and Hispaniola (today split between Haiti and the Dominican Republic). Neocnus was small, with a long tail and a broad trunk, as well as lissome limbs and long claws. This sloth was known for having caudal vertebrae that were broad, a trait shared with other sloths, indicating that this animal, like the tamandua of today, likely used its tail to stand upright. The caniniform teeth of the Neocnus were large and triangular, and its skull was deep and had a large, sagittal crest which, when used with the deep mandible likely allowed strong exertion by the masticatory muscles.

The fossils of this sloth were found in Haitian cave deposits. They have been dated to as recently as 4391 BP, calibrated to c. 5000 BP. It is theorized that this sloth, in common with other Antillean sloths, was most likely hunted to extinction by the indigenous peoples of the Caribbean for its pelt and meat. Neocnus is suspected of having been semi-arboreal.

== See also ==
- Pilosans of the Caribbean
