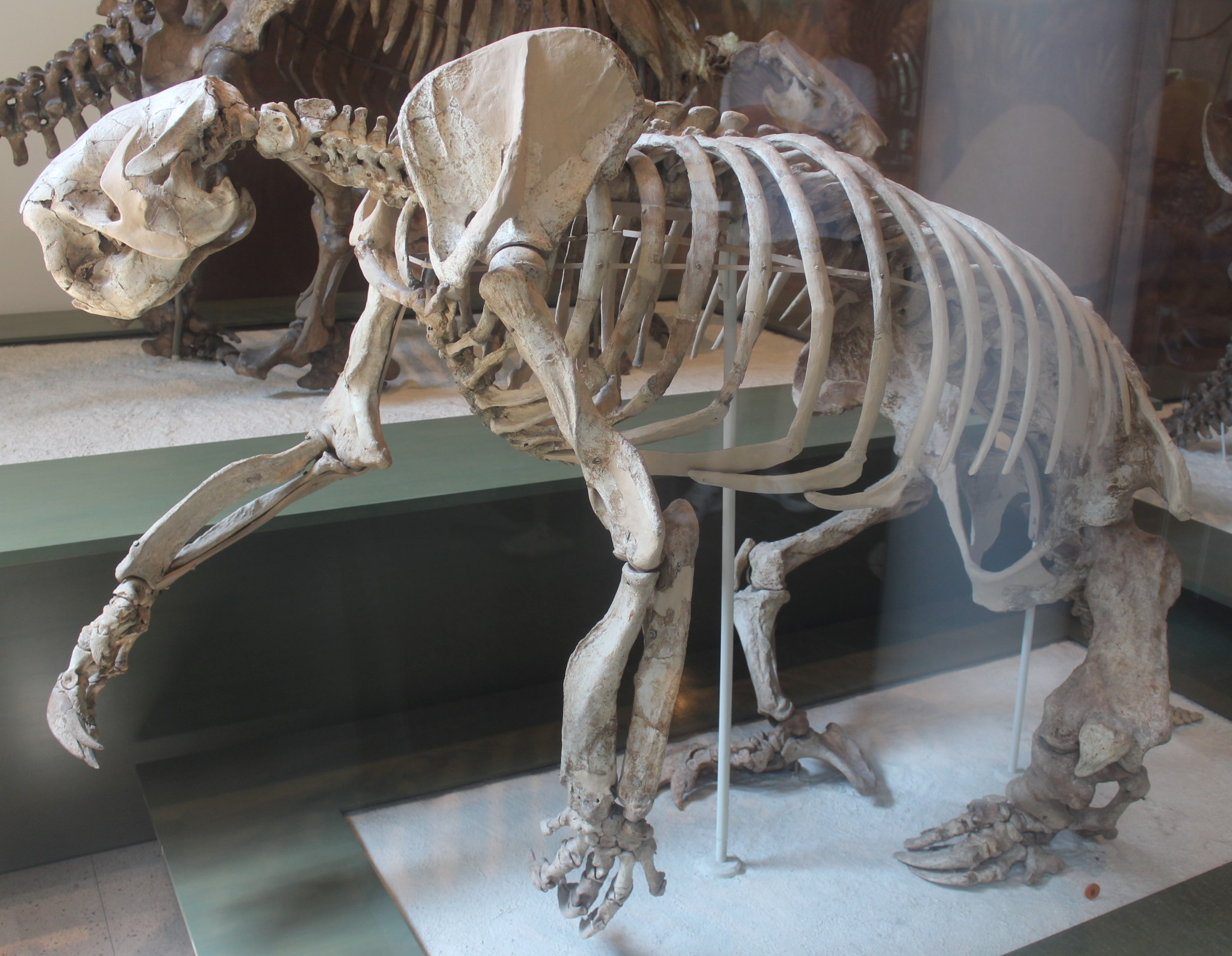
- M. wheatleyi skeleton in AMNH

Scientific classification
- Kingdom: Animalia
- Phylum: Chordata
- Class: Mammalia
- Order: Pilosa
- Suborder: Folivora
- Family: †Megalonychidae
- Subfamily: †Megalonychinae
- Genus: †Megalonyx; Jefferson, 1799

Type species
- †Megatherium jeffersonii Desmarest, 1822

Species
- †M. jeffersonii (Desmarest, 1822); †M. leptostomus Cope, 1893; †M. matthisi Hirschfeld & Webb, 1963; †M. obtusidens Webb & Perrigo, 1985; †M. wheatleyi Cope, 1871

= Megalonyx =

Megalonyx Temporal range: 5–0.013 Ma Early Pliocene - Late Pleistocene

Extinct genus of ground sloths

Megalonyx (Greek, "great-claw") is an extinct genus of ground sloths of the family Megalonychidae, native to North America. It evolved during the Pliocene Epoch and became extinct at the end of the Late Pleistocene, living from ~5 million to ~13,000 years ago. The type species, M. jeffersonii (also called Jefferson's ground sloth), the youngest and largest known species, measured about 3 m (9.8 ft) in length and weighed up to nearly 1,300 kg (2,900 lb).

Megalonyx is suggested to have descended from Pliometanastes, a genus of ground sloth that had arrived in North America during the Late Miocene around 9 million years ago, prior to the main phase of the Great American Interchange. Megalonyx had the widest distribution of any North American ground sloth, having a range encompassing most of the contiguous United States, extending as far north as Alaska during warm interglacial periods.

Megalonyx is notable for having been originally described by future U.S. President Thomas Jefferson in 1799 based on remains found in West Virginia; the species M. jeffersonii was described later, named in honor of him.

Megalonyx became extinct as part of the end-Pleistocene extinction event, simultaneously with all other mainland ground sloths and most other large mammals native to the Americas. These extinctions followed the arrival of humans in the Americas, and there is evidence that humans interacted with Megalonyx, including butchering its remains shortly prior to its extinction.

== Taxonomy ==
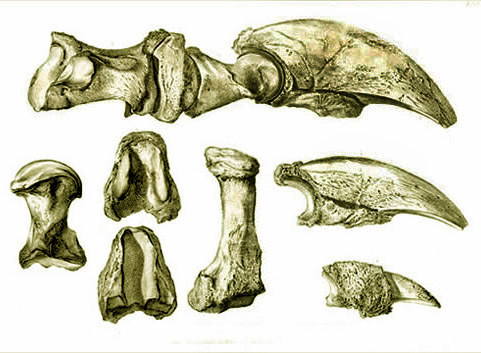
Bones and claw cores of Megalonyx jeffersonii, illustrated by Wistar, 1799

In 1796, Colonel John Stuart sent Thomas Jefferson, shortly before he took office as Vice President of the United States, some fossil bones: a femur fragment, ulna, radius, and foot bones including three large claws. The discoveries were made in a cave in Greenbrier County, Virginia (presently West Virginia). Jefferson examined the bones and presented his observations in the paper "A Memoir on the Discovery of Certain Bones of a Quadruped of the Clawed Kind in the Western Parts of Virginia" to the American Philosophical Society in Philadelphia on March 10, 1797. The paper was published in 1799, in the same volume as an accompanying paper by his colleague Caspar Wistar, who provided detailed anatomical information about the bones, and illustrated them. Together these two papers are considered the first North American publications devoted to paleontology.

In the 1799 paper, Jefferson named the then-unknown animal Megalonyx ("great-claw") and compared each recovered bone to the corresponding bone in a lion. In his original draft of the paper, Jefferson thought the animal was a carnivore, one of the large cats, writing "Let us only say then, what we may safely say, that he was more than three times as large as the lion". In a postscript, composed after learning of Baron Georges Cuvier's description and illustration of the giant ground sloth Megatherium, discovered in Argentina (mistakenly referred to as Paraguay), Jefferson revised his interpretation and compared Megalonyx to Megatherium.

Contrary to Baron Cuvier's view that extinction had played an important role in natural history, an idea that would reach scientific consensus decades later, Jefferson wrote about a "completeness of nature" whose inherent balance did not allow species to go extinct naturally. He asked Lewis and Clark, as they planned their famous expedition in 1804–1806, to keep an eye out for living specimens of Megalonyx, as this would support his case. His idea made no headway and was later shown to be incorrect. However, Jefferson's notion that humans and Megalonyx co-existed in North America has been shown to be correct, as some bones of Megalonyx show marks made by flint tools.

His presentation to the American Philosophical Society in 1797 is often credited as the beginning of vertebrate paleontology in North America. In 1799, Caspar Wistar correctly identified the remains as those of a giant ground sloth. In 1822, Desmarest named the species Megatherium jeffersonii in honor of the former statesman and scientist, although he classified it in the genus Megatherium instead. Richard Harlan in 1825 revived the genus Megalonyx with the type species M. jeffersonii, and provided additional taxonomic description. Scientific papers variously give the authority for the genus as Jefferson 1799 (after Jefferson's original naming of the genus), or Harlan 1825. Most authors gave Jefferson as the authority on the genus until a 1942 paper by George Gaylord Simpson, who suggested that the attribution of the authority to Jefferson "is certainly erroneous", and suggested that Harlan "may have been the first to use the name in a valid Linnaean form". A 2024 review paper by Loren E. Babcock found that Simpson's views were mistaken, and clarified that Jefferson was the valid author of the genus, as the description was done in accordance with the rules of taxonomic nomenclature at the time, despite him not assigning a species to it.

Recent research confirms that the sloth bones were discovered in Haynes Cave in Monroe County, West Virginia. For many decades in the twentieth century, the reported origin of Jefferson's "Certain Bones" was Organ Cave in what is now Greenbrier County, West Virginia. This story was popularized in the 1920s by a local man, Andrew Price of Marlinton. The story came under scrutiny when in 1993 two fragments of a Megalonyx scapula were found in Haynes Cave in neighboring Monroe County. Smithsonian paleontologist Frederick Grady presented evidence in 1995 confirming Haynes Cave as the original source of Jefferson's fossil.

Jefferson reported that the bones had been found by saltpeter workers. He gave the cave owner's name as Frederic Crower. Correspondence between Jefferson and Colonel Stuart, who sent him the bones, indicates that the cave was located about five miles from Stuart's home and that it contained saltpeter vats. An investigation of property ownership records revealed "Frederic Crower" to be an apparent misspelling of the name Frederic Gromer.

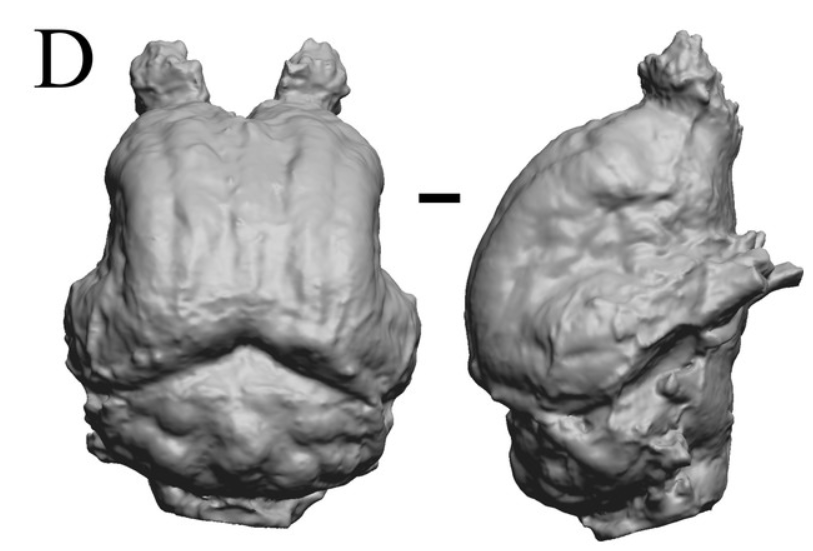
Digital endocast of the cranial cavity of Megalonyx jeffersoni.

Organ Cave was never owned by Gromer, but Haynes Cave was. Two letters written by Tristram Patton, the subsequent owner of Haynes Cave, indicate that this cave was located in Monroe County near Second Creek. Monroe County had originally been part of Greenbrier County; it became a separate county shortly after the discovery of the bones. In his own letters Patton described the cave and indicated that more fossil bones remained inside.

M. jeffersonii is still the most commonly identified species of Megalonyx. It was designated the state fossil of West Virginia in 2008.

M. leptostomus, named by Cope (1893), lived from the Blancan to the Irvingtonian. This species lived from Florida to Texas, north to Kansas and Nebraska, and west to New Mexico, Nevada, Oregon, and Washington. It is about half the size of M. jeffersonii. It evolved into M. wheatleyi, the direct ancestor of M. jeffersonii. Species gradually got larger, with different species mostly based on size and geologic age.

=== Evolution ===
The first wave of Megalonychids came to North America by island-hopping across the Central American Seaway from South America, where ground sloths arose, prior to formation of the Panamanian land bridge. Based on molecular results, its closest living relatives are the three-toed sloths (Bradypus); earlier morphological investigations came to a different conclusion. Megalonyx is thought to be descended from Pliometanastes, a ground sloth that arrived in North America during the late Miocene, around 9 million years ago.

The earliest representatives of Megalonyx appeared during the Pliocene. M. jeffersonii lived from the late Middle Pleistocene/ late Irvingtonian (250–300,000 years ago) through to the Rancholabrean of the Late Pleistocene (11,000 BP). M. jeffersonii was probably descended from M. wheatleyi. The Megalonyx lineage increased in size with time, with the last species M. jeffersonii being the largest.

== Description ==
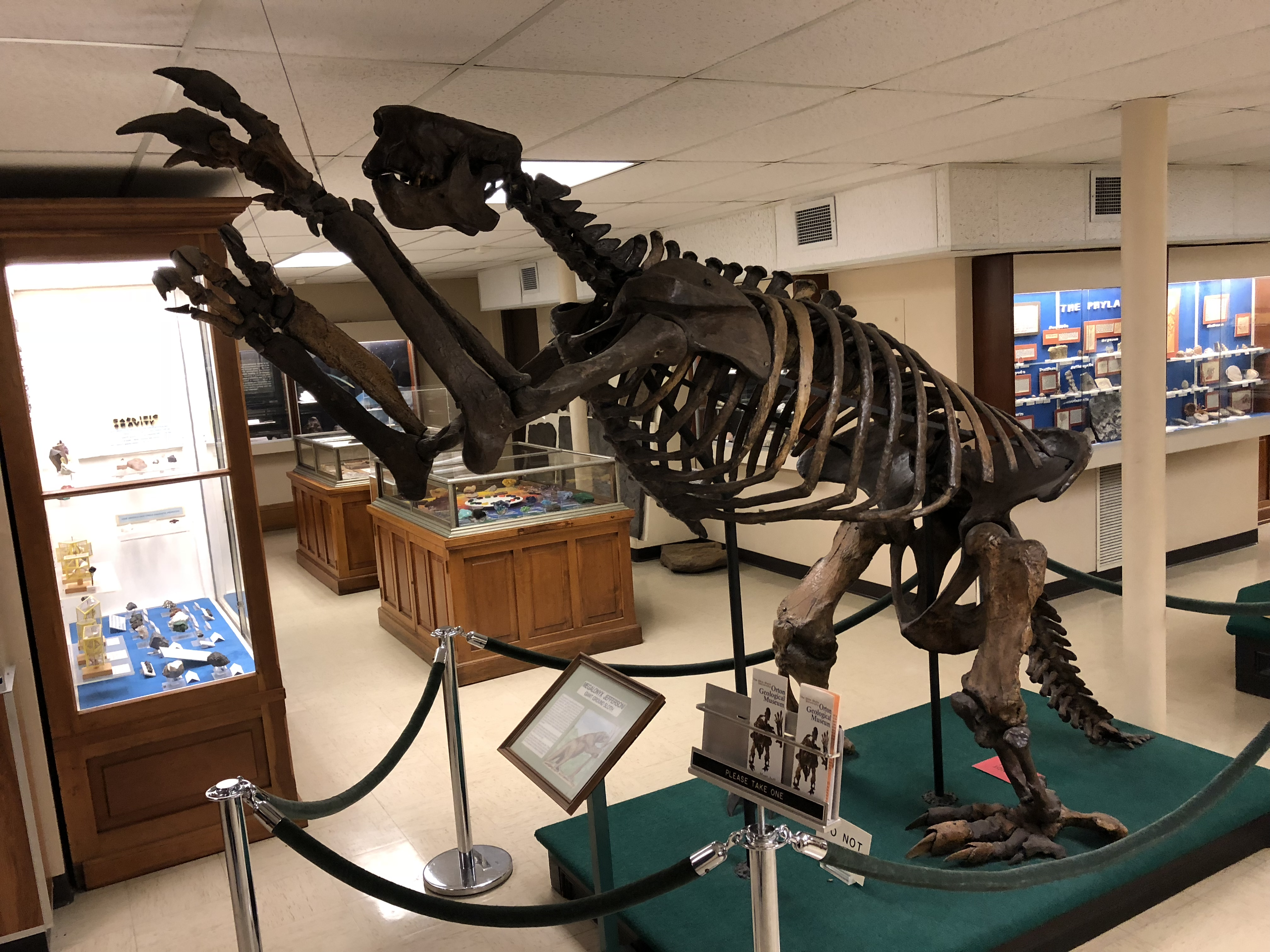
A skeleton of M. jeffersonii on display in the Orton Geological Museum. This skeleton was mounted in 1896.

Adult M. jeffersonii measured around 3 m (9.8 ft) long, and weighed up to 1,090–1,295 kg (2,403–2,855 lb). The hind limbs were plantigrade (flat-footed) and this, along with its stout tail, allowed it to rear up into a semi-erect position to feed. The hands had three large claws, which were likely used for grasping and defense. The teeth of Megalonyx jeffersonii were hypselodont (high crowned).

== Paleobiology ==
During excavations at Tarkio Valley in southwest Iowa, an adult (presumably female) Megalonyx jeffersonii was found in direct association with two juveniles of different ages, the oldest suggested to be around 3–4 years old, suggesting that adults cared for young of different generations. A 2022 study estimated, that according to a formula developed by Blueweiss et al. (1978) for estimating life history from body mass, the average lifespan was approximately 19 years, sexual maturity occurred at about 6 and a half years, that gestation time was around 14 months, and the interval between births was approximately 3 years. An alternative formula for lifespan based on body mass detailed in Sacher 1959 estimated a lifespan of around 49 years for M. jeffersoni. Megalonyx is thought to have been a browser. Stable isotopic study consisting of paired δ^{13}C and δ^{15}N analysis of M. jeffersonii specimens found in Saltville Quarry in Virginia has found that they predominantly relied on C_{3} plants for sustenance.

== Distribution and habitat ==
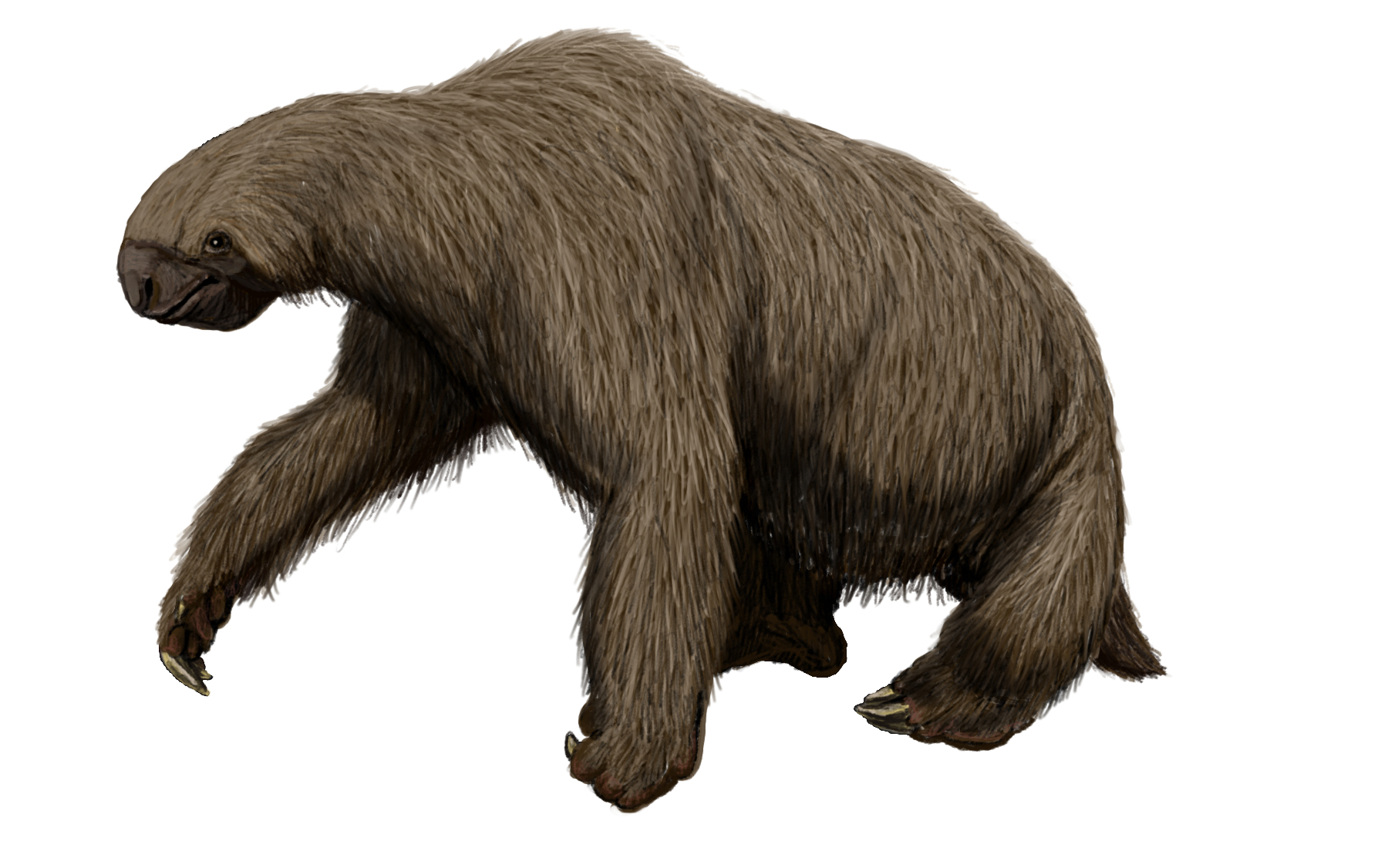
Life restoration of M. wheatleyi

Megalonyx jeffersonii ranged over much of North America, with its range spanning nearly the whole contiguous United States and parts of southern Canada, with some remains known as far south as central Mexico. Their remains have been found as far north as Alaska and the Yukon during interglacial intervals. The sloth ranged as far northeast as New York.

In 2010, a specimen was discovered at the Ziegler Reservoir site near Snowmass Village, Colorado, in the Rocky Mountains at an elevation of 8,874 feet (2,705 m). The habitat of Megalonyx jeffersonii was highly variable, but often associated with spruce-dominated, mixed conifer-hardwood forest.

== Extinction ==
Megalonyx jeffersonii became extinct at the end of the Pleistocene, as part of the Quaternary extinction event, in which all other mainland ground sloths and most other large mammals of the Americas became extinct. The youngest confirmed radiocarbon date is in Ohio, dating to 13,180–13,034 calibrated years Before Present. This timing was co-incident with both the Younger Dryas and a major growth in population of recently arrived Paleoindians. In Ohio, a specimen of Megalonyx jeffersonii, dubbed the "Firelands Ground Sloth", dating to around 13,738 to 13,435 calibrated years Before Present (~11,788 to 11,485 BCE) was found with cut marks indicative of butchery, suggesting that hunting may have played a role in its extinction.

== See also ==
- Paramylodon a mylodontid ground sloth native to North America during the Pliocene and Pleistocene
- Nothrotheriops a nothrotheriid ground sloth native to North America during the Pleistocene
