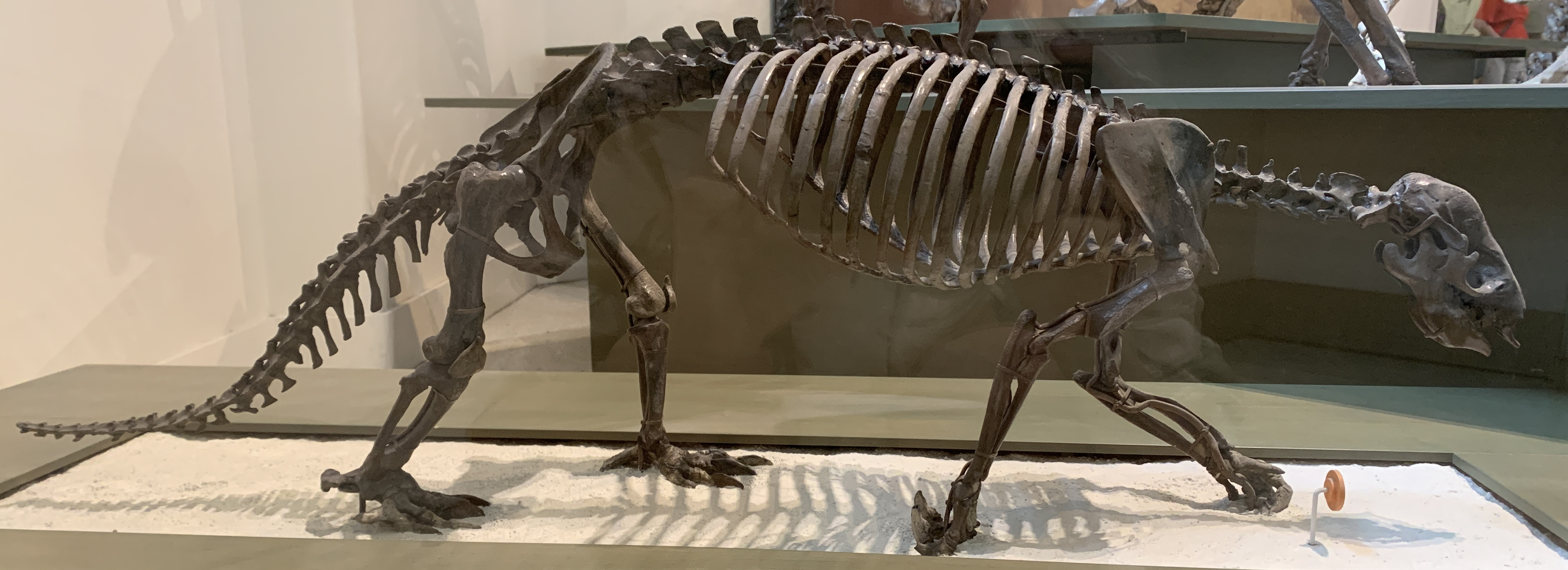
- H. ruetimeyeri, collected from Rio Gallegos, Patagonia, Argentina. At the AMNH.

Scientific classification
- Kingdom: Animalia
- Phylum: Chordata
- Class: Mammalia
- Order: Pilosa
- Superfamily: Megatherioidea
- Genus: †Hapalops; Ameghino, 1887

Type species
- †Hapalops rectangularis Ameghino, 1887

Other species
- H. adteger Ameghino, 1887; H. aguirrei Mercerat, 1891; H. angustipalatus Ameghino, 1891; H. antistis Ameghino, 1891; H. atlanticus Ameghino, 1891; H. australis Mercerat, 1891; H. boulei Mercerat, 1891; H. brachycephalus Ameghino, 1894; H. brevipalatus Ameghino, 1891; H. cadens; H. cilindricus Ameghino, 1891; H. cognathus Mercerat, 1891; H. congermanus Ameghino, 1891; H. crassidens Ameghino, 1891; H. crassignathus Ameghino, 1891; H. crassissimus Ameghino, 1894; H. curvus Ameghino, 1899; H. depressipalatus Ameghino, 1891; H. diverssidens Ameghino, 1891; H. ellipticus; H. elongatus Ameghino, 1891; H. forticulus Ameghino, 1891; H. gallaicus; H. gracilidens Ameghino, 1891; H. grandaevus Moreno and Mercerat, 1891; H. grandis Ameghino, 1894; H. hyperleptus Ameghino, 1891; H. indifferens Ameghino, 1887; H. infernalis Ameghino, 1887; H. latus Ameghino, 1894; H. longiceps Scott, 1903; H. longipalatus Ameghino, 1891; H. longipes; H. minutus Ameghino, 1891; H. platycephalus Scott, 1903; H. ponderosus Scott, 1903; H. primus Ameghino, 1894; H. rectagulidens Ameghino, 1891; H. robustus Ameghino, 1891; H. rostratus Ameghino, 1887; H. rutimeyeri Ameghino, 1891; H. sectus Ameghino, 1891; H. subcuadratus Ameghino, 1891; H. testudinatus Ameghino, 1891; H. vulpiceps Scott, 1903

= Hapalops =

Hapalops Temporal range: Early-Late Miocene (Santacrucian-Huayquerian) ~17.5–7.246 Ma

Extinct genus of ground sloths

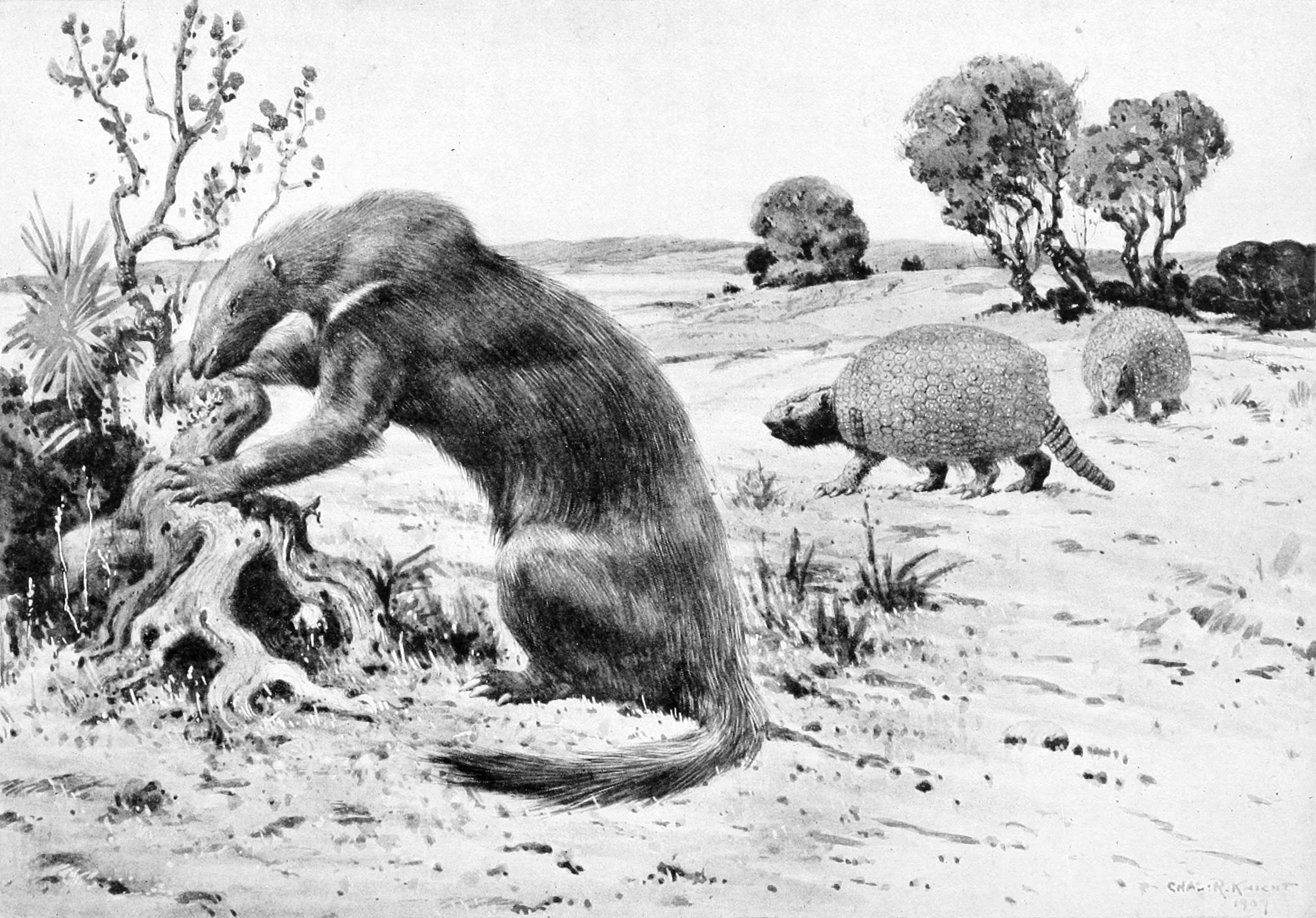
Life restoration of Hapalops longiceps and Propalaehoplophorus australis

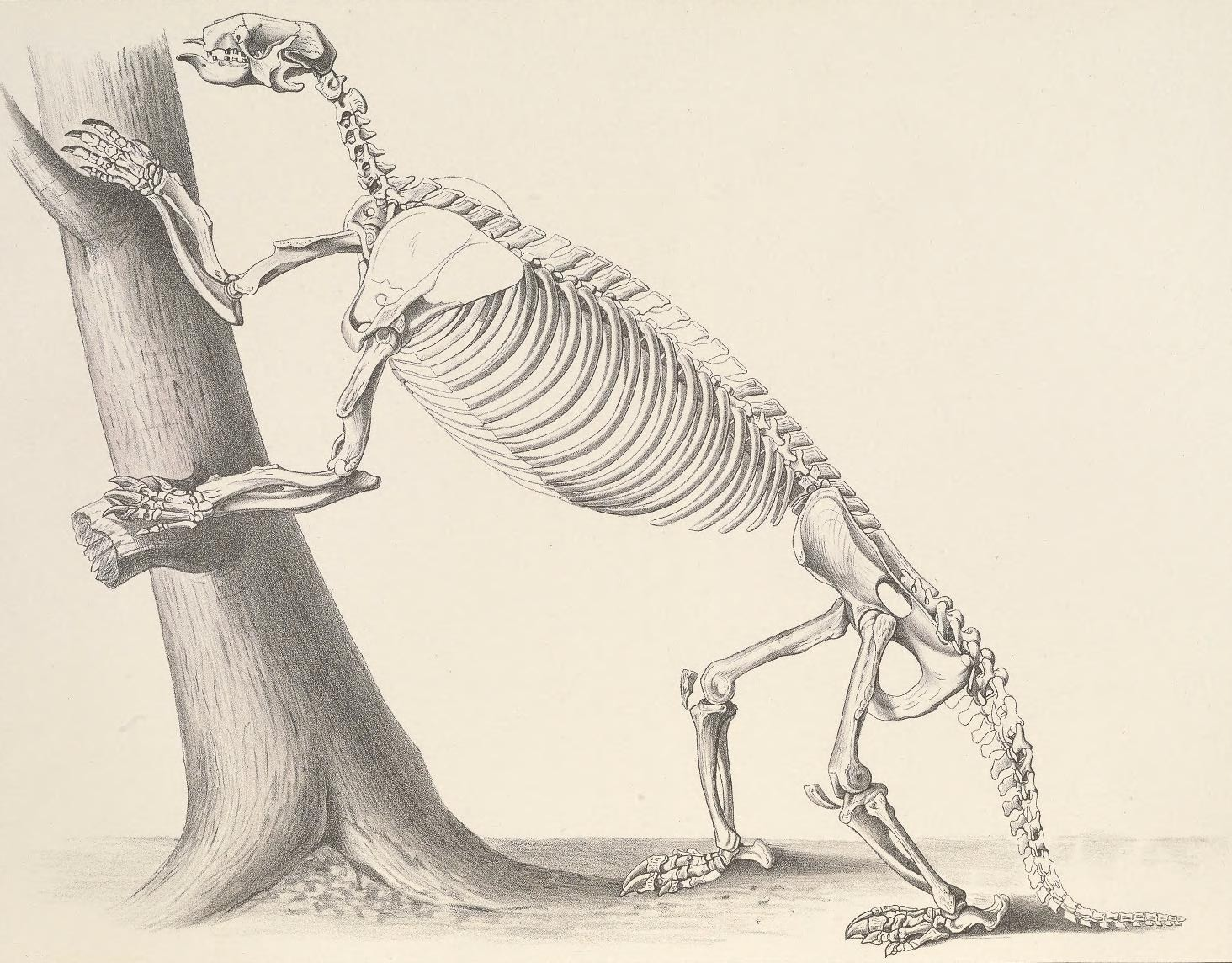
Skeleton

Hapalops is an extinct genus of ground sloth from the Early to Late Miocene of Brazil (Solimões Formation), Bolivia (Honda Group), Colombia (Honda Group), and Argentina (Santa Cruz Formation) in South America.

== History ==
Hapalops was first described by notable Argentine paleontologist and zoologist Florentino Ameghino in 1887, with his description of H. rectangularis as the type species. It was erected based on the posterior part of a left dentary that had been collected from the Miocene aged deposits of Santa Cruz, Argentina, though Ameghino also described a second partial mandible from the same deposits as part of the species, making it a paratype. All of these fossils have been lost and their fragmentary status puts the validity of the genus as a whole in jeopardy.

== Description ==
Sloths in this genus had a long, robust body with more than 19 thoracic vertebrae, a short skull, and long limbs with large, curved claws. They were small sloths, measuring about 1 metre (3.3 ft) in length. On the ground, they probably walked on the knuckles of the forelimbs, like a gorilla. Hapalops had very few teeth with no incisors; the mandible included only four pairs of teeth.

== Paleobiology ==
In the Santa Cruz, Hapalops fed on vegetation in intertropical wooded savannas. It shared its environment with both herbivorous and predatory marsupials, sheep-sized glyptodonts, armadillos, anteaters, toxodonts, typotheres, and litopterns, as well as modern reptiles such as iguanas and birds such as rheas, geese, and hawks. Giant phorusrachid "terror birds" lived in the region and may have been the top predators. Dental microwear indicates that Hapalops was a grazing herbivore. Like most extinct sloths, Hapalops is categorised as a ground sloth, but it is believed that the smaller size of Hapalops allowed it to engage in some climbing behaviors.

== Classification ==
The genus is classified within the Megatherioidea, which includes the megalonychid and the nothrotheriid sloths. While it is generally represented as an outgroup to Nothrotheriidae and a genus of uncertain relationships, it shows most of the character states that diagnose Nothrotheriidae and may be a close relative. At least 26 species in this genus have been named from the same Santa Cruz formation, a biological impossibility largely based on assigning new species names to fossil fragments. The genus awaits revision.
