= Arthropods associated with sloths =

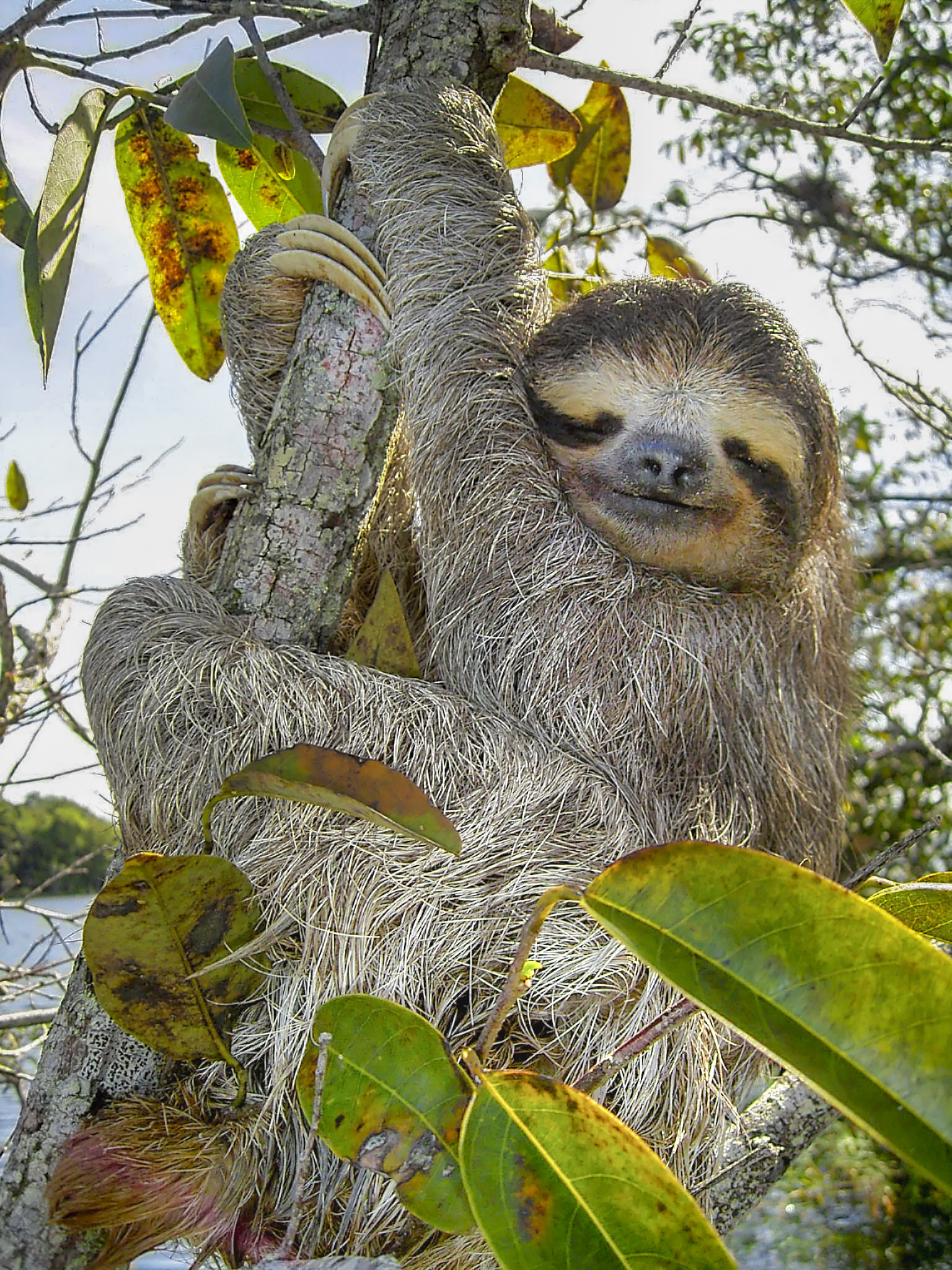
Brown three-toed sloth

A large number of arthropods are associated with sloths. These include biting and blood-sucking flies such as mosquitoes and sandflies, triatomine bugs, lice, ticks and mites. The sloth's fur forms a micro-ecozone inhabited by green algae and hundreds of insects. Sloths have a highly specific community of commensal beetles, mites and moths.

Species of sloths recorded to host arthropods include:

- Pale-throated three-toed sloth Bradypus tridactylus
- Brown three-toed sloth Bradypus variegatus
- Linnaeus's two-toed sloth Choloepus didactylus

The large variety of arthropods associated with sloths comprise two distinct feeding guilds – the haematophagous guild, represented by biting flies, mites, and ticks, and the coprophagous guild which comprises a unique assemblage of moths and beetles which utilize the sloth principally for phoresis and whose larval stages feed and develop in the dung of the host sloth.

== Haematophagous guild ==
Six species of ticks of the genus Amblyomma have been recorded from both two- and three-toed sloths in Central and South America. Of these, two species, Amblyomma geayi and Amblyomma varium are host-specific to sloths and the others are considered as accidental infestations.

Adult males of Amblyomma geayi may remain on their hosts for more than three weeks, but the females depart after engorging to oviposit. Infestation with ticks can be extremely high. Up to 99% of three-toed sloths, and 86.7% of two-toed sloths have been recorded carrying ticks of Amblyomma spp at Manaus, Brazil. The tick Ambylomma varium have been recorded underneath the thighs of maned sloths (Bradypus torquatus) examined in the Poço das Antas Biological Reserve in the State of Rio de Janeiro. Most of the ticks were male (up to 83%) and the majority of sloths (60%) carried only male ticks.

Three species of macrochelid ascarine mites are recorded from inside the anus and rectum of three-toed sloths from Curari Island and Manaus. These are Macrocheles impae, Macrocheles uroxys and Macrocheles lukoschusi. Besides these, the blood-sucking mites Liponissus inheringi, Lobalges trouessarti and Edentalges bradypus have been reported from three-toed sloths collected in southern Brazil. The mite Edentalges choloepi has also been recorded on Choloepus didactylus.

== Coprophagous guild ==
Research in the area of Manaus, Brazil, on sloths and their associated arthropod fauna of sloths, reveals a diverse and dynamic community, with nine species of the coprophagous guild. Population strength for some species shows large fluctuations while for others, populations show stability. The diversity of coprophagous arthropods associated with sloths suggests intense competition among their larval, dung-feeding stages.

Beetles form a prominent portion of the arthropod community associated with sloth and sloth dung. A number of species of the coprophilous family Scarabaeidae are associated with three-toed but not two-toed sloths. The populations of these beetles can be quite large, in one case more than 980 beetles of the species Trichilium adisi were found in the fur of a single sloth. Beetles of the genus Uroxys have been recorded from sloths in Bolivia, Brazil, Colombia and Panama.

Beetles appear to congregate preferentially in specific parts of the body. For example, scarab beetles occur near the elbow or on the flanks behind the knees buried deep inside the fur, while those of Trichilium spp have been found in the underfur of the lower back and thighs of Bradypus torquatus. Beetle larvae and some adult beetles use sloth dung for feeding. The population of beetles varies and the seasonal factors affecting the population size are yet to be ascertained.

Lepidopteran moths of the snout moth families have evolved to inhabit sloth fur exclusively. Typically, sloth moths follow a life-style broadly on the lines of Cryptoses choloepi, a moth in the snout moth family that lives exclusively in the fur of the brown three-toed sloth Bradypus variegatus infuscatus. Adult female moths leave the fur of the sloth to lay eggs in the sloth droppings when the sloth descends, once a week, to the forest floor to defecate. The larvae of Cryptoses choloepi live in the dung and newly emerged moths later fly from the dung pile into the forest canopy to find a host sloth.

Lepidopterans belonging to the coprophagous guild that are specialised to live around sloths include:

- Bradipodicola hahneli (Insecta: Lepidoptera: Crambidae)
- Cryptoses choloepi (Insecta: Lepidoptera: Pyralidae)
- Cryptoses waagei (Insecta: Lepidoptera: Pyralidae)
- Cryptoses rufipictus (Insecta: Lepidoptera: Pyralidae)
- Bradyphila garbei (Insecta: Lepidoptera: Pyralidae)

== See also ==
- Sloth moth
