= Sloth moth =

Type of moth

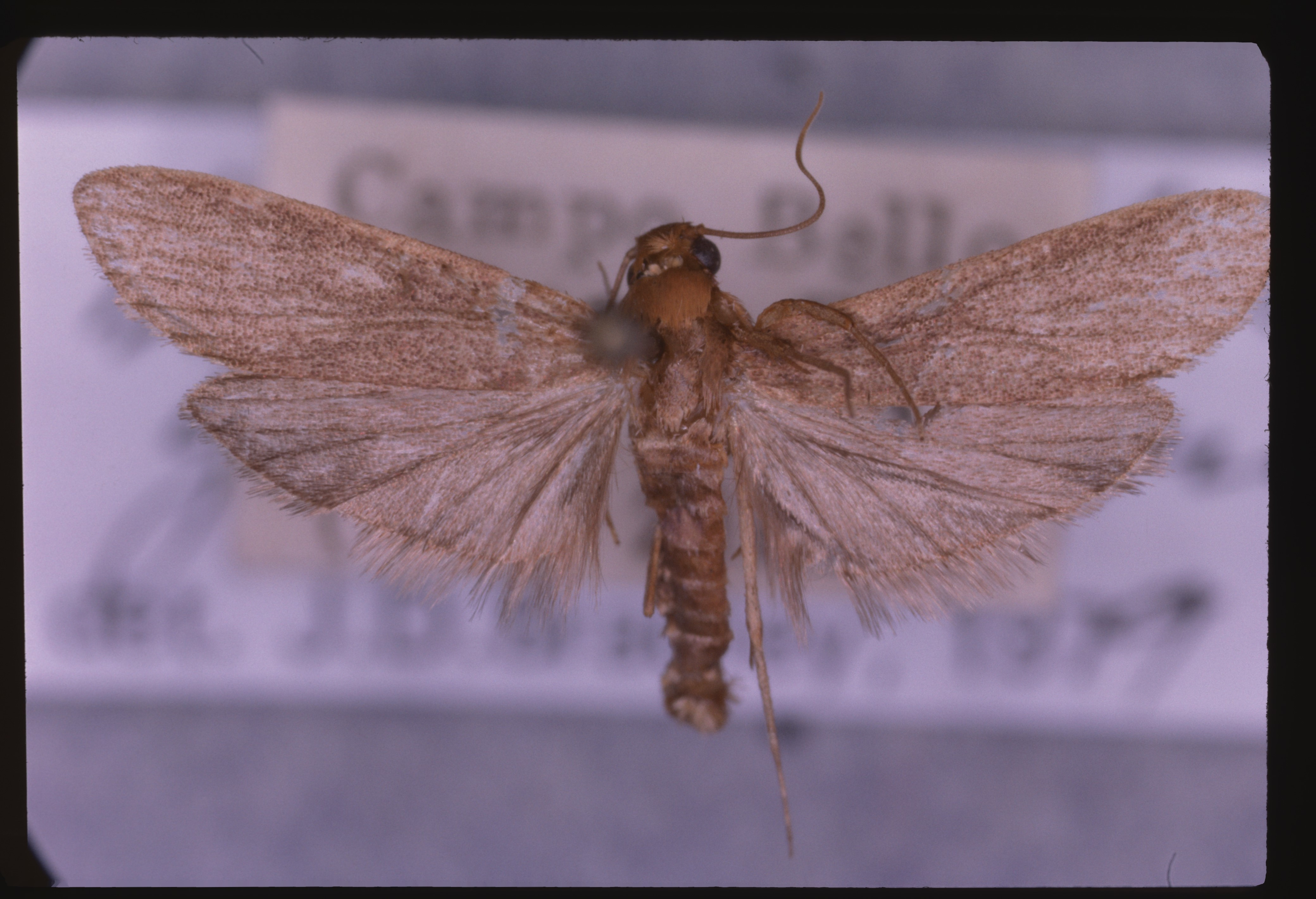
Bradypophila garbei, a species of sloth moth.

A sloth moth is a coprophagous moth which has evolved to exclusively inhabit the fur of sloths and to use sloth dung as a substrate for the early stages of reproduction. Sloth moths include Bradypodicola hahneli, Cryptoses choloepi, Cryptoses waagei, Cryptoses rufipictus, and Bradypophila garbei.

Certain lepidopteran moths of the snout moth family Pyralidae (namely subfamily Chrysauginae) have evolved to inhabit sloth fur exclusively. Typically, sloth moths follow a life-style broadly on the lines of Cryptoses choloepi, a moth in the snout moth family that lives exclusively in the fur of the brown three-toed sloth Bradypus variegatus infuscatus. Adult female moths leave the fur of the sloth to lay eggs in the sloth droppings when the sloth descends, once a week, to the forest floor to defecate. The larvae of Cryptoses choloepi live in the dung and newly emerged moths later fly from the dung pile into the forest canopy to find a host sloth.

Chrysaugine moths, such as Cryptoses spp., spend their lives as adults in the fur of sloths, particularly the three-toed species, except when the sloths descend to defecate and females fly to the sloth dung to oviposit. An imbalance in population sex ratios favouring males has been noticed and surmised as female moths not making it back to host sloths after ovipositing.

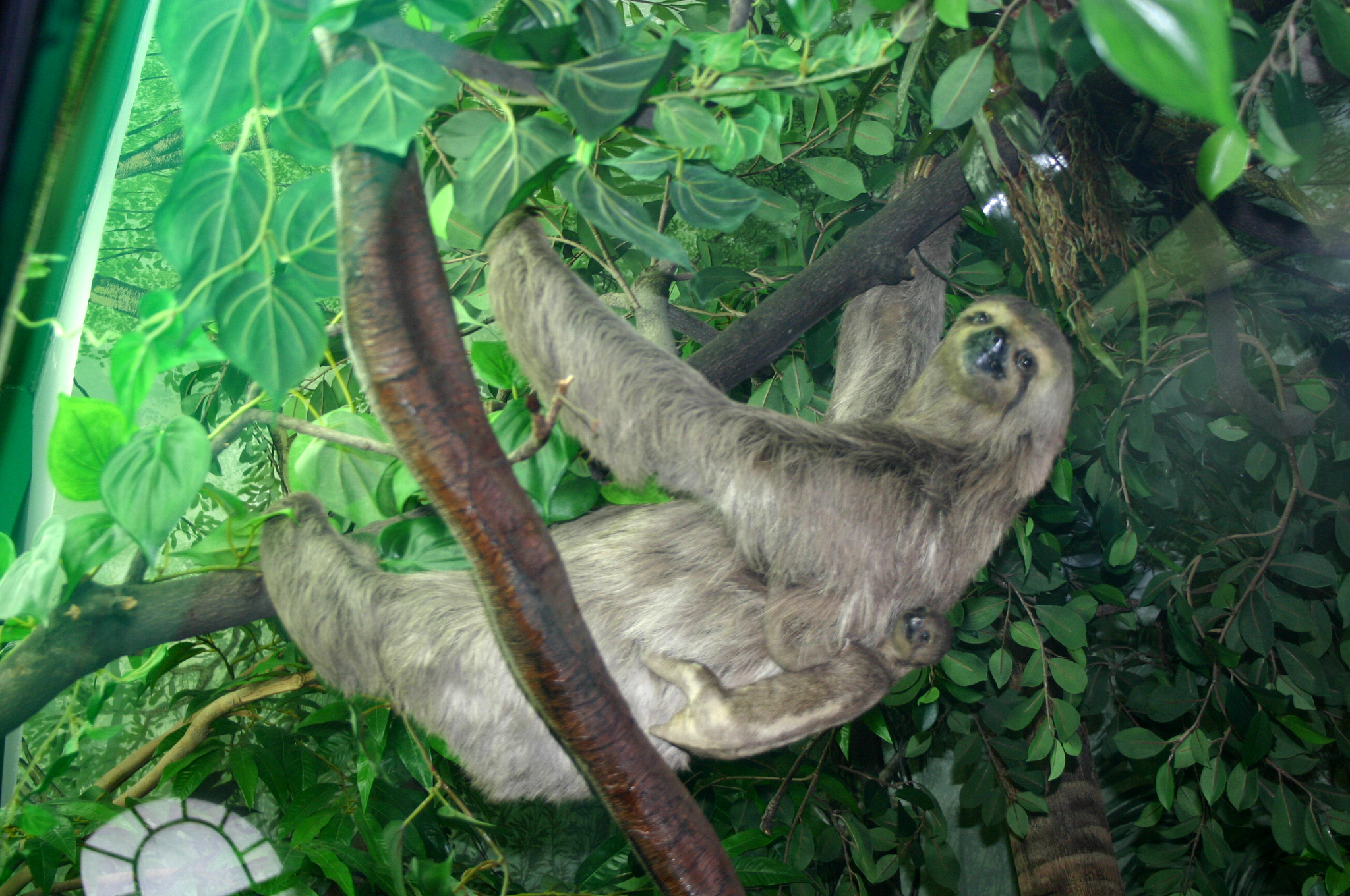
Pale-throated sloth (Bradypus tridactylus)

Sloth moths are thought to get nutrients from the secretions of the sloths' skin and the algae present on the fur, as well as protection from avian predators.

Some individual three-toed sloths have been recorded carrying more than 120 moths in their fur. Two-toed sloths are recorded as harbouring lower populations. Several different moth species may coexist on the same host animal.

== See also ==
- Arthropods associated with sloths
