= Amblyomma varium =

Scientific classification
- Domain: Eukaryota
- Kingdom: Animalia
- Phylum: Arthropoda
- Subphylum: Chelicerata
- Class: Arachnida
- Order: Ixodida
- Family: Ixodidae
- Genus: Amblyomma
- Species: A. varium

Binomial name
- Amblyomma varium Koch, 1844

Species of tick

Amblyomma varium, or carrapato-gigante-da-preguiça (sloth's giant tick), is a species of hard-backed ticks of the genus Amblyomma, a blood feeding parasite. The adult stage of this tick is specific to the sloths Bradypus tridactylus, Bradypus variegatus, Bradypus torquatus, Choloepus hoffmanni and Choloepus didactylus, with others being considered only incidental infections. It can be found in South America.

== See also ==
- Arthropods associated with sloths
