= Bradypodicola =

Bradypodicola hahneli

Scientific classification
- Kingdom: Animalia
- Phylum: Arthropoda
- Class: Insecta
- Order: Lepidoptera
- Family: Pyralidae
- Subfamily: Chrysauginae
- Genus: Bradypodicola; Spuler, 1906
- Species: B. hahneli

Binomial name
- Bradypodicola hahneli Spuler, 1906

Synonyms
- Bradipodicola hahneli

Genus of moths

Bradypodicola hahneli is a sloth moth in the family Pyralidae that lives exclusively in the fur of the pale-throated three-toed sloth (Bradypus tridactylus), a three-toed sloth found in South America. It is the only species of the genus Bradypodicola.

While the other sloth moth, Cryptoses choloepi, has a continuously convex front of its head, Bradypodicola hahneli has a concave shape of the front of its head.

The three-toed sloth's fur forms a micro-ecozone inhabited by green algae and hundreds of insects. The fur provides a home and protection for the moth which feeds on the algae. It also deposits its eggs in the droppings of the sloth, where they pupate and hatch, the newly hatched moths flying off to look for another sloth to live on.

== See also ==
- Cryptoses choloepi
- Sloth moth
- Arthropods associated with sloths
