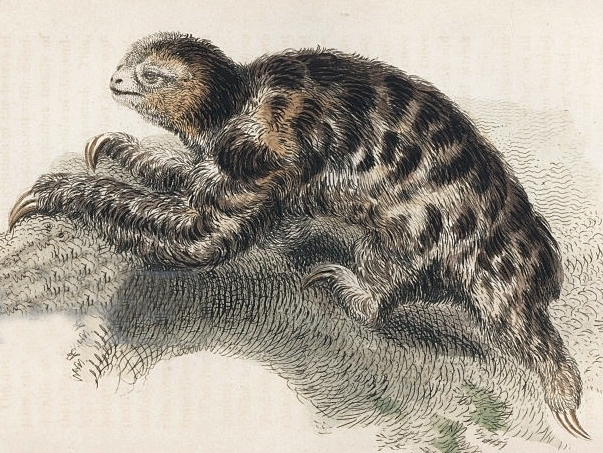

Conservation status
- Critically Endangered (IUCN 3.1)
- CITES Appendix II

Scientific classification
- Kingdom: Animalia
- Phylum: Chordata
- Class: Mammalia
- Order: Pilosa
- Suborder: Folivora
- Family: Bradypodidae
- Genus: Bradypus
- Species: B. pygmaeus

Binomial name
- Bradypus pygmaeus Anderson & Handley, 2001
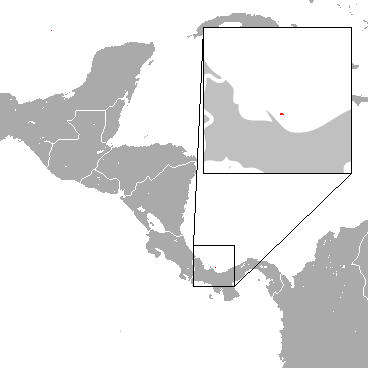
- Range of the pygmy three-toed sloth

= Pygmy three-toed sloth =

Species of mammals from Central America

The pygmy three-toed sloth (Bradypus pygmaeus), also known as the monk sloth or dwarf sloth, is a critically endangered species of sloth in the family Bradypodidae. The species is endemic to Isla Escudo de Veraguas, a small island off the Caribbean coast of Panama. The species was first described by Robert P. Anderson of the University of Kansas and Charles O. Handley Jr., of the Smithsonian Institution in 2001. The pygmy three-toed sloth is significantly smaller than the other three members of its genus, but otherwise resembles the brown-throated three-toed sloth. According to Anderson and Handley Jr., the head-and-body length is between 48 and 53 centimetres (19 and 21 in), and the body mass ranges from 2.5 to 3.5 kg (5.5 to 7.7 lb).

This sloth, like other extant sloths, is arboreal (tree-living) and feeds on leaves. It has a body adapted to hang by its limbs; the large curved claws help the sloth to keep a strong grip on tree branches. It lives high in the canopy but descends once a week to defecate on the forest floor. It is symbiotically associated with green algae, that can provide it with a camouflage. Details of mating behavior and reproduction have not been documented. The pygmy three-toed sloth was once thought to be found exclusively in the red mangroves of Isla Escudo de Veraguas, restricted to an area of 4.3 square kilometres (1.7 sq mi). A 2012 census restricted to the coastal mangroves of the island initially found a population of around 79 individuals, nonetheless a 2015 study suggests this estimate fell considerably short. The actual population is estimated to be between 500 and 1500 with a high-end estimate of 3200 individuals, many of whom were found further inland. The IUCN lists the pygmy three-toed sloth as critically endangered and they are listed on the world's 100 most threatened species.

== Discovery and taxonomy ==
The pygmy three-toed sloth was first described by Robert P. Anderson of the University of Kansas and Charles O. Handley Jr., of the Smithsonian Institution in 2001. The researchers noted that the three-toed sloths found on Isla Escudo de Veraguas were significantly smaller than those that occur on the nearby outer islands of Bocas del Toro Province. Moreover, they differ from other populations in terms of pelage and cranial characteristics. Hence, they considered the three-toed sloths in Isla Escudo de Veraguas to be an independent species and formally described it from the skin and skull of an adult female. The researchers further pointed out that Isla Escudos de Veraguas is the oldest island and located farthest from the mainland, which began breaking up into small islands due to rises in sea levels 10,000 years ago. They proposed that this species evolved from an isolated population that had originated from the mainland population of brown-throated three-toed sloths; it gradually differentiated enough to become an independent species through insular dwarfism. In another study the following year, the researchers observed that the mean body size of three-toed sloths on an island decreases linearly as the age of the island increases; the area of the island and the distance from the mainland, however, do not appear to significantly affect dwarfing.

The pygmy three-toed sloth is one of the four extant members of the genus Bradypus, and is classified under the family Bradypodidae. According to molecular phylogenetic analysis, Bradypodidae nests with Megalonychidae, Megatheriidae and Nothrotheriidae in the sloth superfamily Megatherioidea. The generic name Bradypus is the combination of two Greek words: brady ("slow") and pous ("foot"). The specific name pygmaeus comes from the Greek pugmaios ("as small as a fist"). 'Monk sloth' and 'dwarf sloth' are two other names for this sloth.

== Characteristics ==
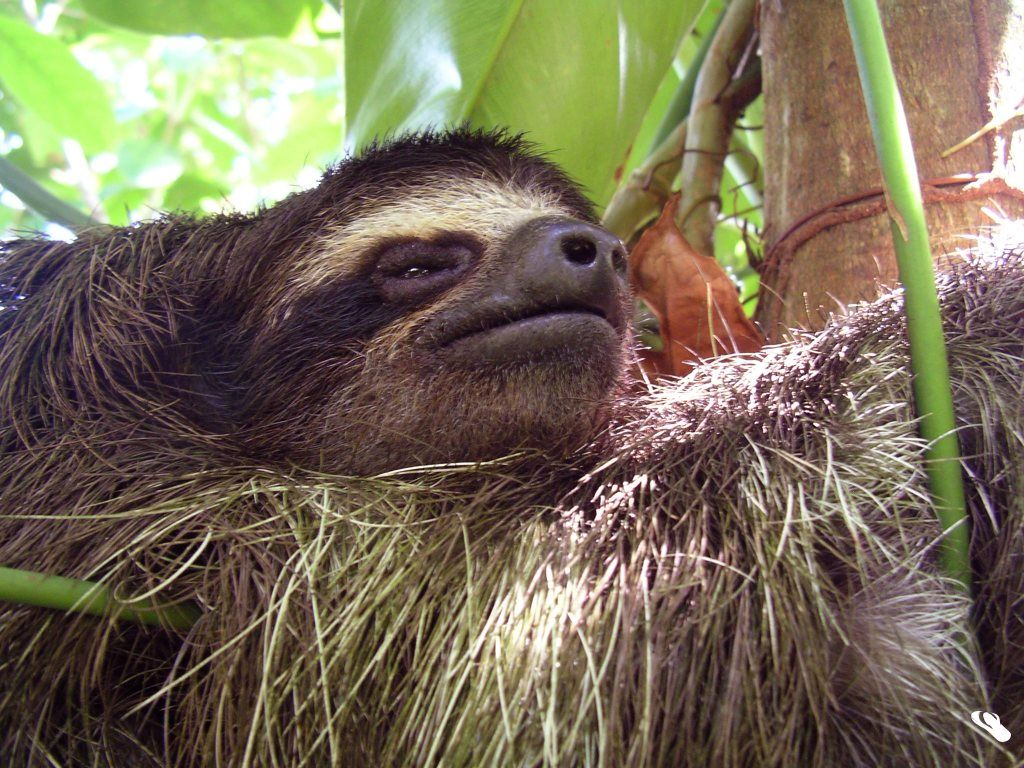
Pygmy three-toed sloth on Isla Escudo de Veraguas

The pygmy three-toed sloth is significantly smaller than the other members of its genus, but otherwise resembles the brown-throated sloth. According to Anderson and Handley Jr., the head-and-body length is between 48 and 53 centimetres (19 and 21 in), and the body mass ranges from 2.5 to 3.5 kg (5.5 to 7.7 lb). The brown-throated sloth is nearly 40% heavier and 15% smaller in head-and-body length than the pygmy three-toed sloth. Moreover, the brown-throated sloth is lighter on the crown. The face is buff to tan; a dark band runs across the brow, surrounded by an orange patch. The throat is gray to brown, lighter than the underbelly; the dark brown back is spotted and has a dark stripe along the midline. Facial hair is short, while the long, rough hair on the crown and shoulders forms a hood. The grayish limbs have three claws each. The tail is 4.5 to 6 centimetres (1.8 to 2.4 in) long.

They have a relatively small and slender skull, with a large external auditory meatus, narrow squamosal and mandibular processes, a minuscule stylomastoid foramen, and usually lack foramina for the external carotid artery and anterodorsal (meaning in front and toward the back) nasopharynx. The dental formula of three-toed sloths is: 54–5 Two of the teeth in each jaw are incisor-like, although those in the upper jaw are small or may be absent. Many of the features found in pygmy sloths are thought to be indicative of a relatively rapid evolution of a new species in an isolated, island habitat.

They host algae inside their fur which causes them to have a greenish color. The algae is generally more noticeable on the top of their head and neck, dorsal portions of the forelimbs, and upper backside.

== Distribution and status ==
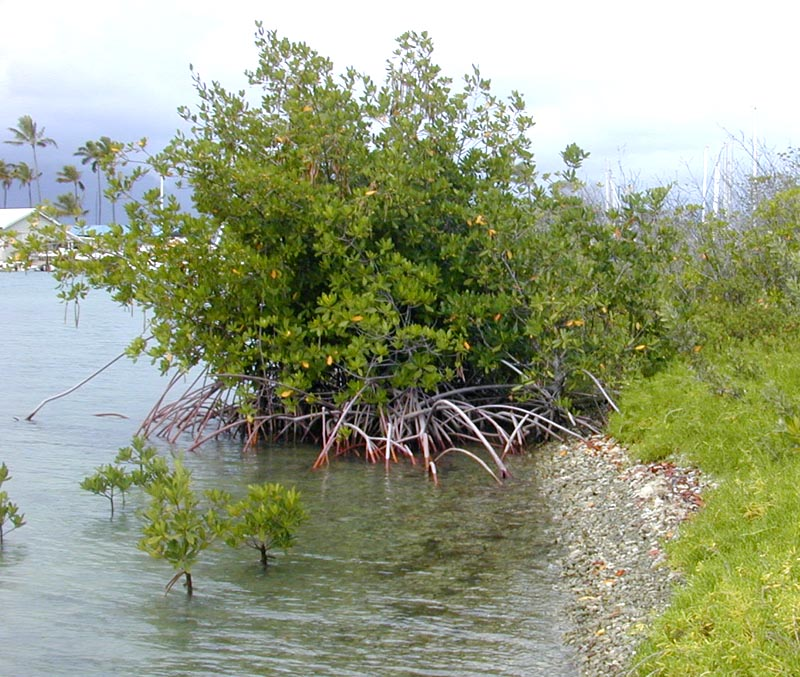
Pygmy three-toed sloths live on red mangroves.

The pygmy three-toed sloth is unique in that it is found exclusively in the red mangroves of Isla Escudo de Veraguas; the island has a small area of approximately 4.3 square kilometres (1.7 sq mi). A 2012 census of pygmy three-toed sloths estimated the total population at 79 – of which 70 occurred on mangroves and 9 in the surroundings. The population density was calculated as 5.8 per hectare (2.3 per acre). The total area occupied by mangroves on the island was estimated to be around 10.67 hectares (0.0412 sq mi). While their population has presumably always been low due to their restricted range, the 2012 census found far lower numbers than had been estimated (less than 500) by the IUCN in 2010.

The IUCN lists the pygmy three-toed sloth as critically endangered; it is also listed in CITES Appendix II. According to the IUCN, conservation efforts are being hampered by conflict between local peoples and the government. Threats to the sloth's survival include timber harvesting and human settlement, that might lead to habitat degradation. After several observations, the corpses of the pygmy three-toed sloth were found to be unharmed physically, suggesting that predation is not a major threat. Instead, disease, habitat loss, or natural causes were larger factors in the species' death. A study in 2011 showed that there were 79 pygmy sloths in the wild. Studies in 2010 and 2013 suggested a recent population bottleneck and decline in genetic variability.

== Ecology and behavior ==
The pygmy three-toed sloth, like others in its genus, is an arboreal (tree-living) animal. This sloth can spend as many as 15 to 20 hours per day on trees. It moves at an extremely slow speed of 0.24 kilometres per hour (0.15 mph), making it one of the slowest animals. The pygmy three-toed sloth is symbiotically related to green algae; a 2010 study investigated this in detail. Different sloths harbour different types of algae – only Tricophilus species were found on the brown-throated and pygmy three-toed sloths. These algae discolor the fur of the sloth, giving it a greenish hue – this serves as an efficient camouflage. Some of these algae might be transferred to offspring through the mother, others may be picked up from the surroundings over time. The smaller size of pygmy sloths reduces their energy requirements for survival and reproduction, making them an apparent example of insular dwarfism. A BBC documentary, in which English naturalist Chris Packham recognizes the pygmy three-toed sloth as the first in his list of the top ten discoveries in the 2000s, shows a rare clip of a swimming pygmy three-toed sloth.

Like other sloths, the pygmy three-toed sloth feeds on leaves. It feeds on red mangrove leaves, which are relatively poor in nutrients and coarser than the tender leaves of Cecropia species eaten by brown-throated sloths on the mainland. Details of mating behavior and reproduction have not been documented.

== See also ==
- Pilosans of the Caribbean
