= Amblyomma geayi =

Scientific classification
- Kingdom: Animalia
- Phylum: Arthropoda
- Subphylum: Chelicerata
- Class: Arachnida
- Order: Ixodida
- Family: Ixodidae
- Genus: Amblyomma
- Species: A. geayi

Binomial name
- Amblyomma geayi Neumann, 1899

Species of tick

Amblyomma geayi is a species of hard-backed ticks of the genus Amblyomma, a blood feeding parasite. This tick is specific to sloths, such as three-toed sloths of the genus Bradypus and very rarely of two-toed sloths of the genus Choloepus. It is native to the northern part of South America, mainly the Amazon rainforest region, but there have been reports of importation to other regions such as Japan. An adult female tick has an average length of 5.48 mm and a male tick 4.22 mm.

== See also ==
- Arthropods associated with sloths
