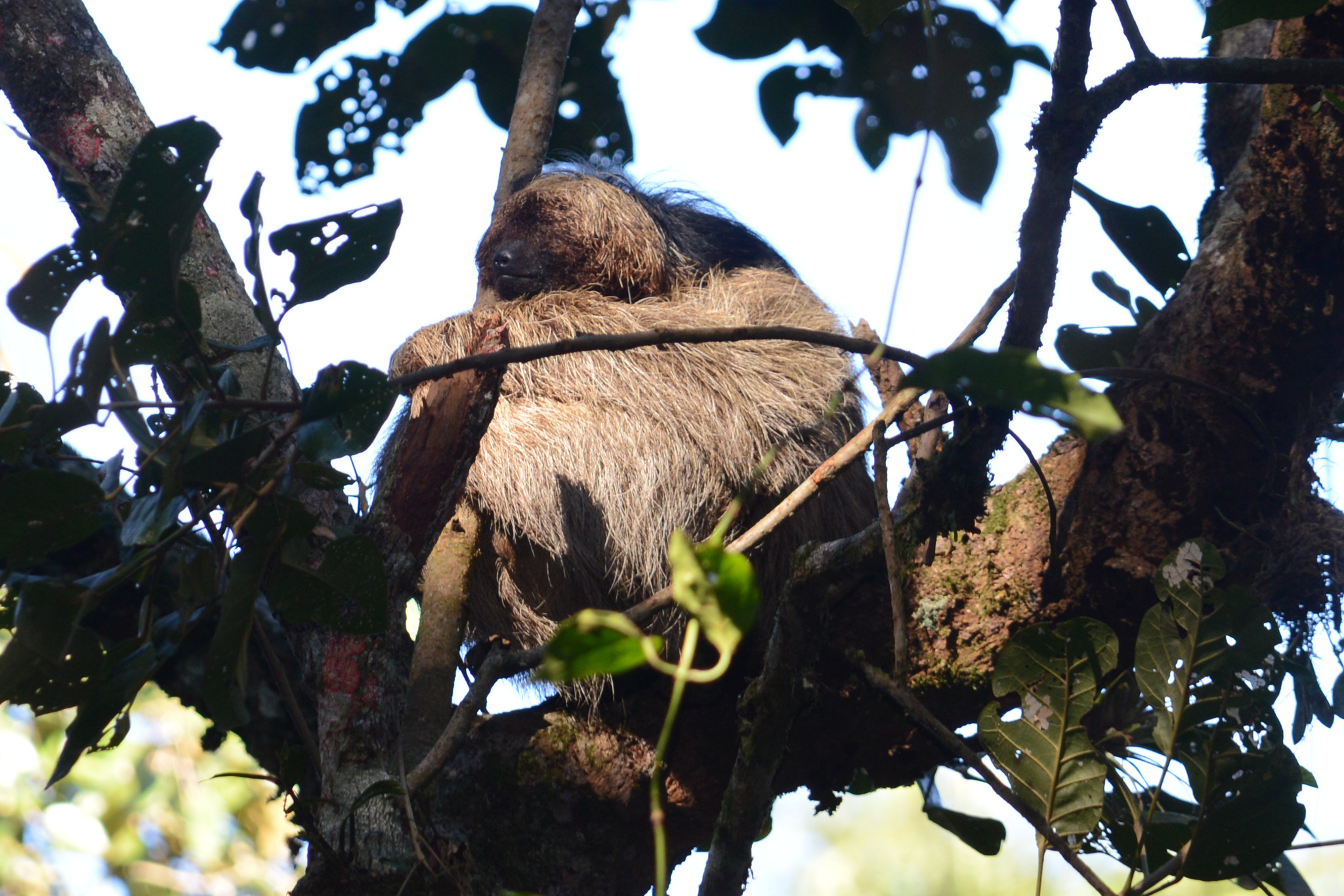

Conservation status
- Endangered (IUCN 3.1)

Scientific classification
- Kingdom: Animalia
- Phylum: Chordata
- Class: Mammalia
- Infraclass: Placentalia
- Order: Pilosa
- Suborder: Folivora
- Family: Bradypodidae
- Genus: Bradypus
- Species: B. crinitus

Binomial name
- Bradypus crinitus J. E. Gray, 1850
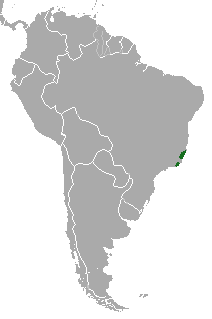
- Southern maned sloth range

= Southern maned sloth =

Species of mammal

The southern maned sloth (Bradypus crinitus) is a species of three-toed sloth.

== Description ==
The southern maned sloths have flatter skulls, rounder jaws, and wider cheekbones than the northern maned sloths. The species has a head that looks like a coconut.

== Distribution ==
The sloth is endemic to Brazil's Atlantic Forest, a highly biodiverse region. Southern maned sloths were found in Rio de Janeiro and Espírito Santo.

== Discovery ==
The species was discovered by John Edward Gray in 1850, but his assertions were later dismissed, with taxonomists agreeing that the specimen, that Gray described was a B. torquatus, but the new study proves that B. critinus does indeed exist. The B. crinitus separated from B. torquatus in the north by more than 4 million years of evolution. B.torquatus and B. crinitus are allopatrically distributed that diverged during the Early Pliocene (period of global cooling).

== Name ==
The sloth received Gray's old name, Bradypus crinitus. The name crinitus means 'hairy', referring to its coconut-like head.

== Conservation status ==
In March 2025, the IUCN Red List evaluated the southern maned sloth as Endangered, noting its decreasing population.
