= Paraguaná spiny pocket mouse =

Conservation status
- Endangered (IUCN 3.1)

Scientific classification
- Domain: Eukaryota
- Kingdom: Animalia
- Phylum: Chordata
- Class: Mammalia
- Order: Rodentia
- Family: Heteromyidae
- Genus: Heteromys
- Species: H. oasicus

Binomial name
- Heteromys oasicus Anderson, 2003

Species of rodent

The Paraguaná spiny pocket mouse (Heteromys oasicus) is a South American species of rodent in the family Heteromyidae. It is known from two localities at elevations above 200 m, Cerro Santa Ana and the Fila de Monte Cano, within the Paraguaná Peninsula in Venezuela. While this region consists mostly of arid shrublands, this pocket mouse is found in elevated areas that provide cloud forest or mesic habitat with evergreen and semideciduous vegetation, such as terrestrial bromeliads. It is more likely to be found near streams. The species is threatened by habitat degradation due to goat grazing and development.
