= Robert P. Anderson (zoologist) =

American zoologist and mammalogist

Robert Paul Anderson
- Education: Kansas State University
- Known for: Species distribution modeling, taxonomy of Neotropical mammals
- Scientific career
- Fields: Zoology, Mammalogy, Biogeography, Ecology, Taxonomy
- Workplaces: City College of New York; American Museum of Natural History
- Thesis: Systematics and biogeographic modeling of spiny pocket mice (Rodentia: Heteromyidae: Heteromys) in South America (2001)
- Website: andersonlab.ccny.cuny.edu

Robert Paul Anderson is an American zoologist and mammalogist whose research focuses on biogeography, ecology, and taxonomy. He is a professor at the City College of New York and the City University of New York, and a research associate at the American Museum of Natural History.

== Biography ==
Anderson studied biology at Kansas State University, where he earned his Ph.D. in 2001 with a dissertation on the systematics and biogeography of South American spiny pocket mice (Heteromys). He subsequently worked as a postdoctoral researcher at the American Museum of Natural History, where he developed and applied methods for modeling species niches and geographic distributions. These approaches are now widely used in conservation biology, studies of invasive species, zoonotic diseases, and assessments of climate change impacts on biodiversity.

Anderson currently serves as a professor in the Department of Biology at the City College of New York and continues as a research associate in the Division of Vertebrate Zoology (Mammalogy) at the American Museum of Natural History.

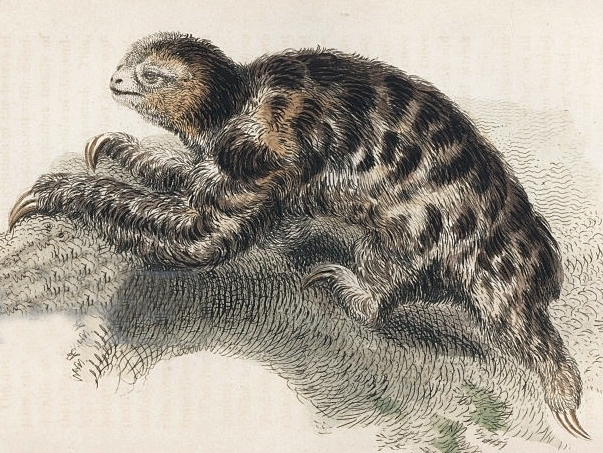
Anderson co-described the pygmy three-toed sloth (Bradypus pygmaeus) in 2001 with Charles O. Handley Jr.

Taxonomically, Anderson’s work centers on Neotropical mammals, integrating fieldwork, morphology, climatology, physiology, and genetics. Alone or with colleagues and students, he has described several new mammal species, including the pygmy three-toed sloth (Bradypus pygmaeus) in 2001 with Charles O. Handley Jr. and four new species of spiny pocket mice (Heteromys): the Ecuador spiny pocket mouse (Heteromys teleus) in 2002, the Paraguaná spiny pocket mouse (Heteromys oasicus) in 2003, the cloud forest spiny pocket mouse (Heteromys nubicolens) in 2006, and the Aragua spiny pocket mouse (Heteromys catopterius) in 2009.

== Publications ==
In addition to numerous scientific papers, Anderson is co-author and editor of several monographs and contributed the chapter on spiny pocket mice to the 2015 volume Mammals of South America:

- A.T. Peterson, J. Soberón, R. G. Pearson, R. P. Anderson, E. Martínez-Meyer, M. Nakamura, M. B. Araújo (2011). Ecological niches and geographic distributions. Monographs in Population Biology 49. Princeton University Press.
- R. P. Anderson (2015). "Family Heteromyidae." In: J. L. Patton, U. F. J. Pardiñas, G. D’Elía (eds.), Mammals of South America, Volume 2: Rodents. University of Chicago Press, pp. 51–58.
