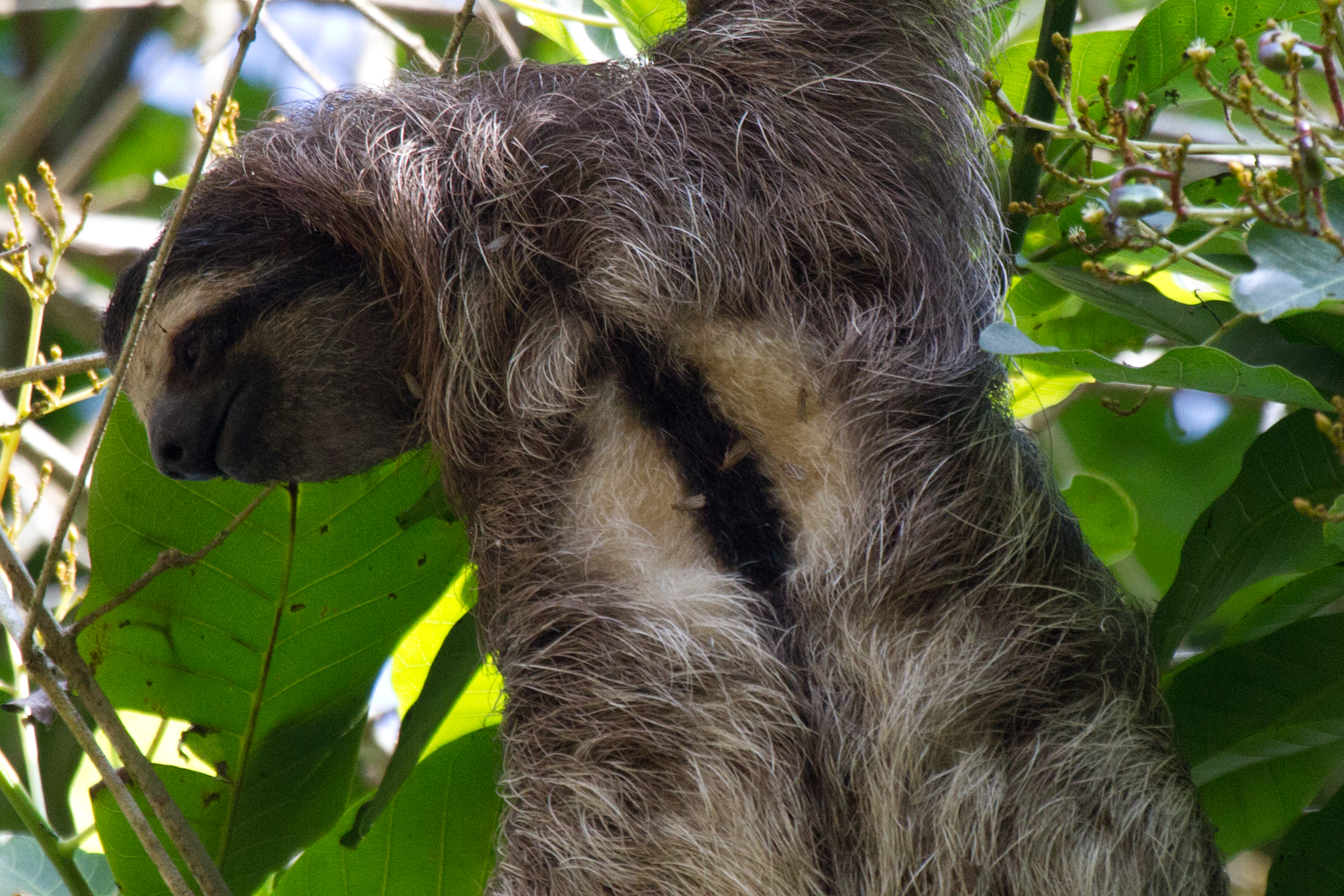
- Several Cryptoses choloepi are visible on the neck and mid-dorsal speculum of this male brown-throated three-toed sloth (Bradypus variegatus griseus).

Scientific classification
- Kingdom: Animalia
- Phylum: Arthropoda
- Clade: Pancrustacea
- Class: Insecta
- Order: Lepidoptera
- Family: Pyralidae
- Genus: Cryptoses
- Species: C. choloepi

Binomial name
- Cryptoses choloepi Dyar, 1908

= Cryptoses choloepi =

Species of moth

Cryptoses choloepi is a sloth moth in the snout moth family that as an adult lives exclusively in the fur of sloths, mammals found in South and Central America.

Adult female moths live in the fur of the brown three-toed sloth Bradypus variegatus infuscatus and leave the fur of the sloth to lay eggs in the sloth droppings when the sloth descends, once a week, to the forest floor to defecate. The larvae of Cryptoses choloepi live in the dung and newly emerged moths later fly from the dung pile into the forest canopy to find a host sloth. In the early larval stages of Cryptoses, there are silken threads spun between two and three pellets, in which they form "nets" where they feed from.

The relationship between Cryptoses choloepi and sloths is "phoretic rather than parasitic," because "Cryptoses benefit from being carried by the sloth to fresh dung piles, the use of the sloths as a refuge from avian predators, and the enhancement of its diet with secretions or algae." It has also been hypothesized that the presence of the moths benefits the sloth because they promote the growth of algae in the sloth's fur by depositing nitrogen thus enhancing the sloth's ability to camouflage.

== See also ==
- Bradipodicola hahneli, another moth associated with sloths
- Sloth moth
- Arthropods associated with sloths
