= Cryptoses =

Scientific classification
- Domain: Eukaryota
- Kingdom: Animalia
- Phylum: Arthropoda
- Class: Insecta
- Order: Lepidoptera
- Family: Pyralidae
- Subfamily: Chrysauginae
- Genus: Cryptoses; Dyar, 1908

Genus of moths

Cryptoses is a genus of snout moths. It was described by Harrison Gray Dyar Jr. in 1908.

== Species ==
- Cryptoses choloepi Dyar, 1908
- Cryptoses rufipictus Bradley, 1982
- Cryptoses waagei Bradley, 1982
