= Cryptoses waagei =

Scientific classification
- Domain: Eukaryota
- Kingdom: Animalia
- Phylum: Arthropoda
- Class: Insecta
- Order: Lepidoptera
- Family: Pyralidae
- Genus: Cryptoses
- Species: C. waagei

Binomial name
- Cryptoses waagei Bradley, 1982

Species of moth

Cryptoses waagei is a species of snout moth in the genus Cryptoses. It was described by John David Bradley in 1982 and is found in Brazil.
