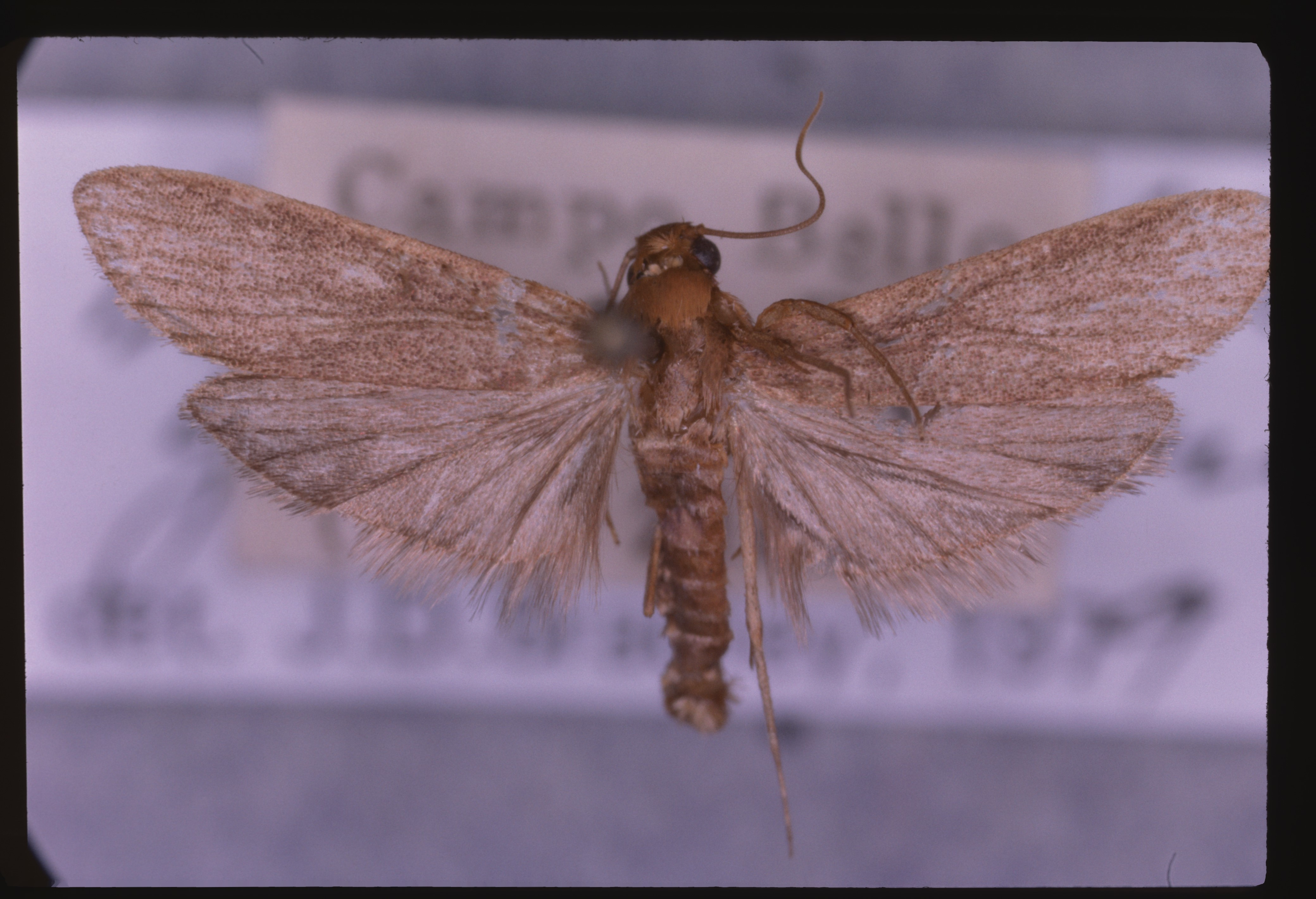

Scientific classification
- Kingdom: Animalia
- Phylum: Arthropoda
- Class: Insecta
- Order: Lepidoptera
- Family: Pyralidae
- Subfamily: Chrysauginae
- Genus: Bradypophila; Ihering, 1914
- Species: B. garbei

Binomial name
- Bradypophila garbei Ihering, 1914

= Bradypophila =

Genus of moths

Bradypophila is a genus of snout moths. It was described by R. v. Ihering in 1914, and contains the species Bradypophila garbei. It is found in Brazil.

The forewings are unicolorous dark ochreous.

The larvae are associated with tree sloths.
