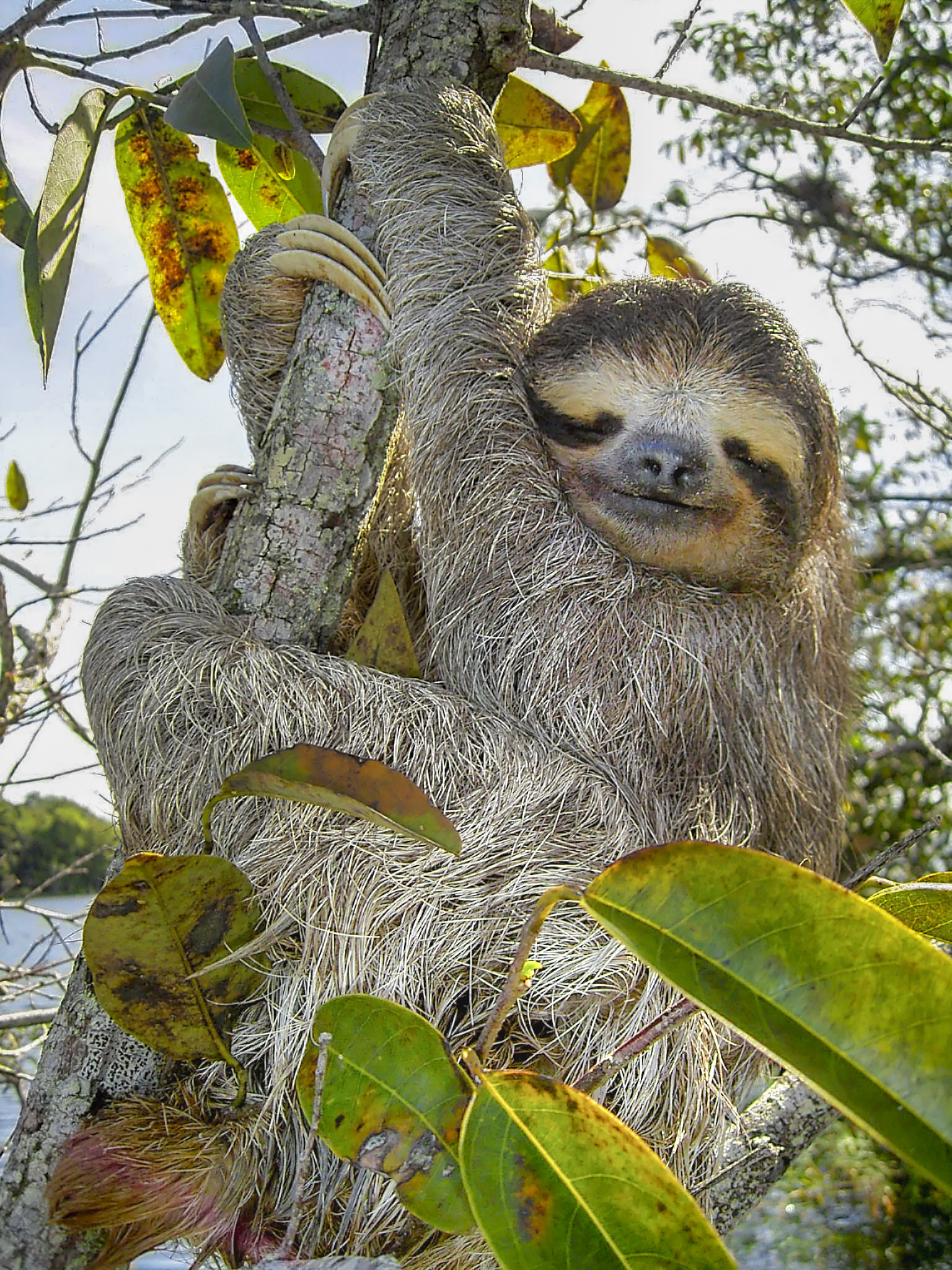
- Brown-throated three-toed sloth (Bradypus variegatus)

Scientific classification
- Kingdom: Animalia
- Phylum: Chordata
- Class: Mammalia
- Order: Pilosa
- Suborder: Folivora
- Superfamily: Megatherioidea
- Family: Bradypodidae; Gray, 1821
- Genus: Bradypus; Linnaeus, 1758

Type species
- Bradypus tridactylus Linnaeus, 1758

Species
- 5, see text
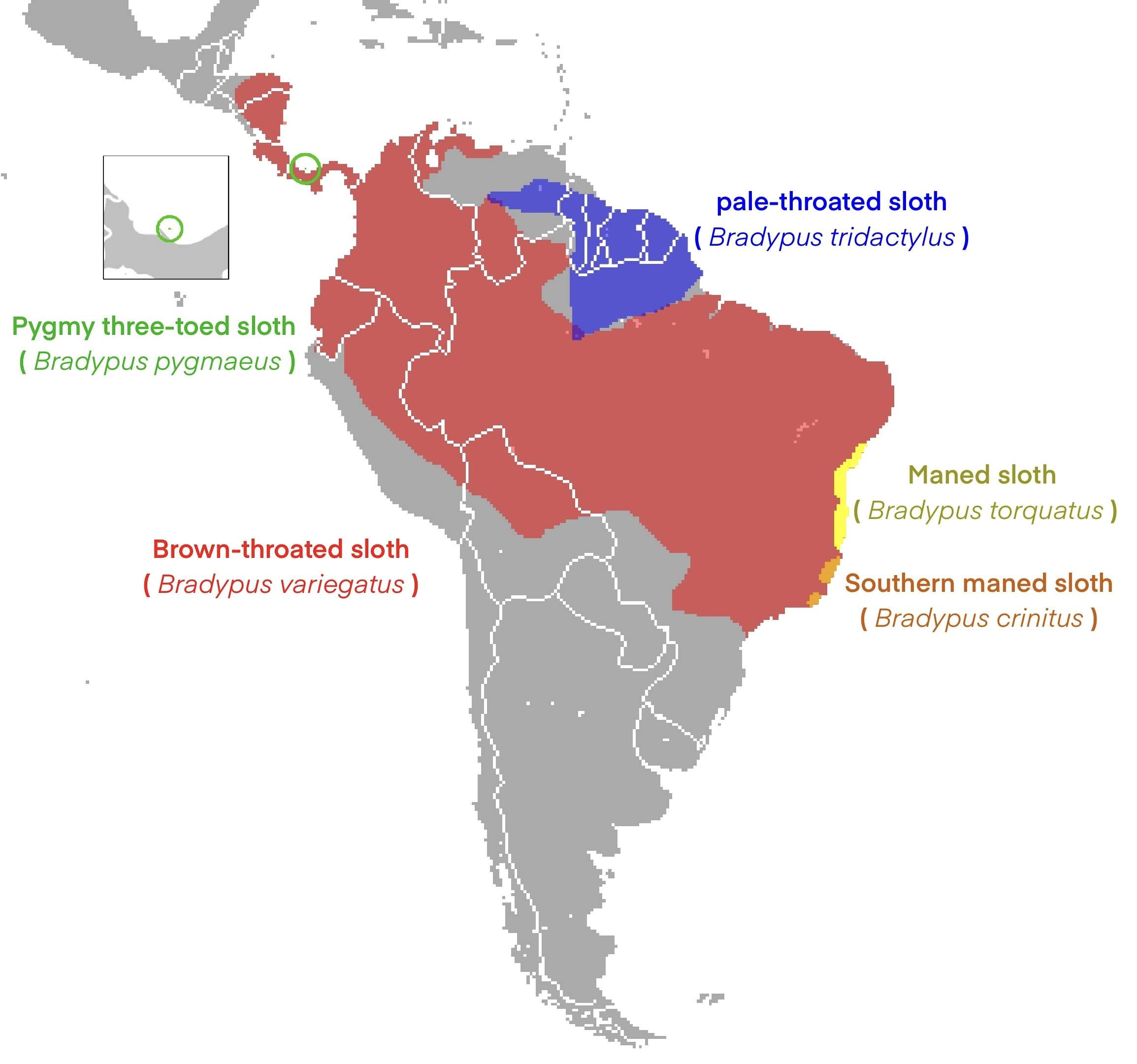
- Green: B. pygmaeus, blue: B. tridactylus, red: B. variegatus, yellow: B. torquatus, orange: B. crinitus

= Three-toed sloth =

Three-toed sloths

Genus of mammals

The three-toed or three-fingered sloths are arboreal neotropical mammals. They are the only members of the genus Bradypus (meaning "slow-footed" in Ancient Greek) and the family Bradypodidae. The five living species of three-toed sloths are the brown-throated sloth, the maned sloth, the pale-throated sloth, the southern maned sloth, and the pygmy three-toed sloth. In complete contrast to past morphological studies, which tended to place Bradypus as the sister group to all other folivorans, molecular studies place them nested within the sloth superfamily Megatherioidea, making them the only surviving members of that radiation.

== Extant species ==
| Subgenus | Image | Scientific name | Common name | Distribution |
|---|---|---|---|---|
| Bradypus | | B. pygmaeus | Pygmy three-toed sloth | Isla Escudo de Veraguas (Panama) |
| Bradypus | | B. tridactylus | Pale-throated sloth | Part of northern South America, including Guyana, Suriname, French Guiana, eastern Venezuela and Brazil north of the Amazon River |
| Bradypus | | B. variegatus | Brown-throated sloth | Central America and much of north and central South America, from Honduras through Colombia, Venezuela, Ecuador, eastern Peru, Bolivia and Brazil |
| Scaeopus | | B. torquatus | Northern maned sloth | Atlantic coastal rainforest of southeastern Brazil |
| Scaeopus | | B. crinitus | Southern maned sloth | Coastal Brazil in Rio de Janeiro and Espírito Santo. |

== Evolution ==
A study of mitochondrial cytochrome b and 16S rRNA sequences suggests that B. torquatus diverged from B. variegatus and B. tridactylus about 12 million years ago, while the latter two split 5 to 6 million years ago. The diversification of B. variegatus lineages was estimated to have started 4 to 5 million years ago.

=== Relation to the two-toed sloth ===
Both types of sloth tend to occupy the same forests; in most areas, a particular species of three-toed sloth and a single species of the somewhat larger and generally faster-moving two-toed sloth will jointly predominate. Although similar in overall appearance, the two genera are placed in different families. Recent phylogenetic analyses support the morphological data from the 1970s and 1980s that the two genera are not closely related and that each adopted their arboreal lifestyles independently. From morphological studies, from which ground-dwelling sloth taxa the three-toed sloths evolved or whether they retained their arboreality from the last common ancestor of extant sloths is unclear. The two-toed sloths were thought on the basis of morphology to nest phylogenetically within one of the divisions of ground-dwelling Caribbean sloths.

Understanding of sloth phylogeny has recently been greatly revised by molecular studies, based on collagen and mitochondrial DNA sequences. These investigations consistently place three-toed sloths within Megatherioidea, close to Megalonyx, megatheriids and nothrotheriids, and two-toed sloths close to mylodontids, while moving the Caribbean sloths to a separate, basal branch of the sloth evolutionary tree. These results provide further strong support for the long-held belief that arboreality arose separately in the two genera via convergent paths.

Cladogram of sloths after Delsuc et al. 2019:

- Folivora (sloths)
  - †Caribbean sloths
  - - Mylodontoidea
      - Two-toed sloths (Choelopus)
      - †Mylodontidae (Mylodon)
    - Megatherioidea
      - †Megatheriidae (Megatherium)
      - - - †Megalonychidae (Megalonyx)
          - †Nothrotheriidae (Nothrotheriops)
        - Three-toed sloths (Bradypus)

== Characteristics ==
Famously slow-moving, a sloth travels at an average speed of 0.24 km/h (0.15 mph). Three-toed sloths are about the size of a small dog or a large cat, with the head and body having a combined length of around 45 cm (18 in) and a weight of 3.5–4.5 kg (8–10 lb). Unlike the two-toed sloths, they also have short tails of 6–7 cm (2–3 in), and they have three clawed toes on each limb. All sloths have three digits on their hindlimbs; the difference is found in the number of digits on the forelimbs; thus they are sometimes referred to as three-fingered sloths. However, sloths are generally regarded as quadrupeds.

== Behavior ==
Like the two-toed sloth, three-toed sloths are agile swimmers. They are still slow in trees. The muscles that sloths use to grip and produce a pulling motion are much more prominent than those that produce a pushing motion. This means that they struggle to support their body weight when walking on all four limbs, so traveling on the ground is a dangerous and laborious process.

Three-toed sloths are arboreal (tree-dwelling), with a body adapted to hang by their limbs. Large, curved claws and muscles specifically adapted for strength and stamina help sloths to keep a strong grip on tree branches. The abdominal organs close to their diaphragm (such as their stomach, liver, and kidneys) are attached to their lower ribs (or pelvic girdle in the latter case) by fibrinous adhesions, which prevent the weight of these organs from compressing their lungs when hanging, making inhalation easier.

They live high in the canopy but descend once a week to defecate on the forest floor. During this week-long interval, their feces and urine accumulate to about a third of their total body mass. It takes about a month for a single leaf to pass through its four-chambered stomach and digestive tract. Although they get most of their fluids from the leaves that they eat, they have been observed drinking directly from rivers. Because of their slow metabolism, they do not need to ingest many leaves on a daily basis, but when ambient temperatures are high, the symbiotic microbes and bacteria present in their gut will break down and ferment food at a faster rate. Conversely, when temperatures are lower, sloths will consume less, which is opposite to what has been observed in most other mammals. Only very few species of sloths are found at higher altitudes, and these are found to have thicker coats than those living in lower altitudes. Some of the extinct species of sloths were able to tolerate cooler temperatures, but researchers believe this was probably due to thicker fur, larger size, larger muscle mass, and more access to a constant food supply.

Their long, coarse fur often appears greenish, due not to pigment, but to algae growing on it. Sloths will consume the algae growing on their fur through the process of autogrooming, and the algae provides the sloths with carbohydrates and lipids, as an additional nutrition source. Sloths' greenish color and their sluggish habits provide an effective camouflage; hanging quietly, sloths resemble a bundle of leaves.

They move between different trees up to four times a day, although they prefer to keep to a particular type of tree, which varies between individuals, perhaps as a means of allowing multiple sloths to occupy overlapping home ranges without competing with each other.

Three-toed sloths are predominantly diurnal, although they can be active at any hour of the day, while two-toed sloths are nocturnal.

== Biology ==
=== Lifecycle ===
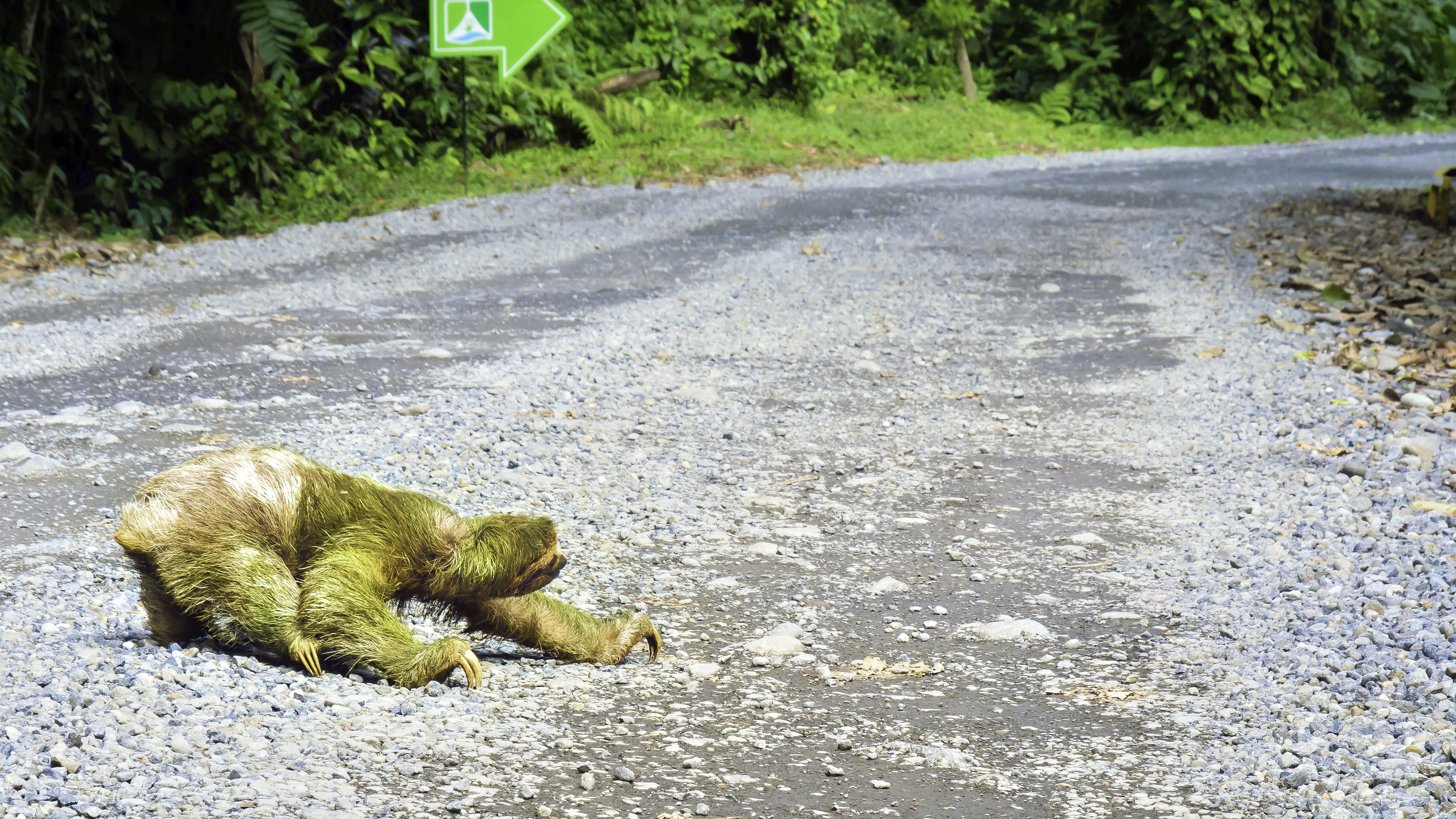
Three-toed sloth crossing a road in Alajuela, Costa Rica

Members of this genus tend to live around 25 to 30 years, reaching sexual maturity at three to five years of age. Three-toed sloths do not have a mating season but breed year-round.

Male three-toed sloths are attracted to females in estrus by their screams echoing throughout the canopy. Sloth copulation lasts an average of 25 minutes. Male three-toed sloths are strongly polygamous and exclude competitors from their territory. Males are also able to compete with one another within small habitable territories. Females give birth to a single young after a gestation period of around six months. The offspring cling to their mother's bellies for around nine months. They are weaned around nine months of age when the mother leaves her home territory to her offspring and moves elsewhere. Adults are solitary, and mark their territories using anal scent glands and dung middens.

The home ranges used by wild brown-throated three-toed sloths in Costa Rica include cacao, pasture, riparian forests, peri-urban areas, and living fence-rows. For the first few months after giving birth, mothers remain at just one or two trees and guide their young. At about five to seven months of age, when the young have become more independent, mothers expand their resources and leave their young in new areas. During natal dispersion, three-toed sloths prefer tropical forests, often using riparian forest habitat to disperse while avoiding pastures and shade-grown cacao. The home range for mothers is larger than those of young. After separation, only the mothers use the cacao-growing forest, but both use riparian forests. Different types of trees are used by both mother and young, which indicates that this agricultural matrix provides an important habitat type for these animals.

=== Dentition and skeleton ===
Three-toed sloths have no incisor or canine teeth, just a set of peg-shaped cheek teeth that are not clearly divided into premolars and molars, and lack homology with those teeth in other mammals, and thus are referred to as molariforms. The molariform dentition in three-toed sloths is simple and can be characterized as dental formula of: 54-5.

Three-toed sloths are unusual amongst mammals in possessing as many as nine cervical vertebrae, which may be due to mutations in the homeotic genes. All other mammals have seven cervical vertebrae, other than the two-toed sloth and the manatee, which have only six.

== Internal and external ecology ==
Three-toed sloths use their gut microbiome to break down the lignocellulose found in the leaves of the cecropia trees that they eat into short chain organic acids, which are then absorbed into the bloodstream to provide energy to the sloth. Firmicutes and Proteobacteria are the main bacterial phyla that dominate the sloth gut microbiome, which is less diverse than in many other herbivores. Not only are Firmicutes bacteria found in feces and digesta, but they are also found externally on the fur of sloths. Some research has found that Firmicutes bacteria in the genera Brevibacterium and Rothia can secrete antibiotic compounds that may provide protection from pathogenic bacteria.

In addition to the gut microbiome, three-toed sloths have a symbiotic relationship with the unique ecosystem that grows on their fur. The ecosystem is home to everything from green algae, insects, and microbes. In particular, there is a proposed symbiosis between three-toed sloths and Trichophilus spp., a genus of green algae, as some Trichophilus spp. have only been found in sloth hair, suggesting that the algae may be passed from the mother to the offspring. The unique structure of sloth hair makes it the ideal place for algal growth due to its structural characteristics of cracks in the hairs and the ability for the hair to retain moisture. The algae has been found in the stomach of sloths, which may indicate that sloths are consuming the algae for some nutritional benefit, although the extent to which the algae provides dietary nutrients is still unclear. The algae may serve other purposes, such as insulation and facilitating growth of beneficial bacterial species, as well as providing the sloths with UV-protection, all in exchange for the habitat for growth provided by the sloth.
