= Cryptoses rufipictus =

Scientific classification
- Domain: Eukaryota
- Kingdom: Animalia
- Phylum: Arthropoda
- Class: Insecta
- Order: Lepidoptera
- Family: Pyralidae
- Genus: Cryptoses
- Species: C. rufipictus

Binomial name
- Cryptoses rufipictus Bradley, 1982

Species of moth

Cryptoses rufipictus is a species of snout moth in the genus Cryptoses. It was described by John David Bradley in 1982 and is known from French Guiana and Brazil.
