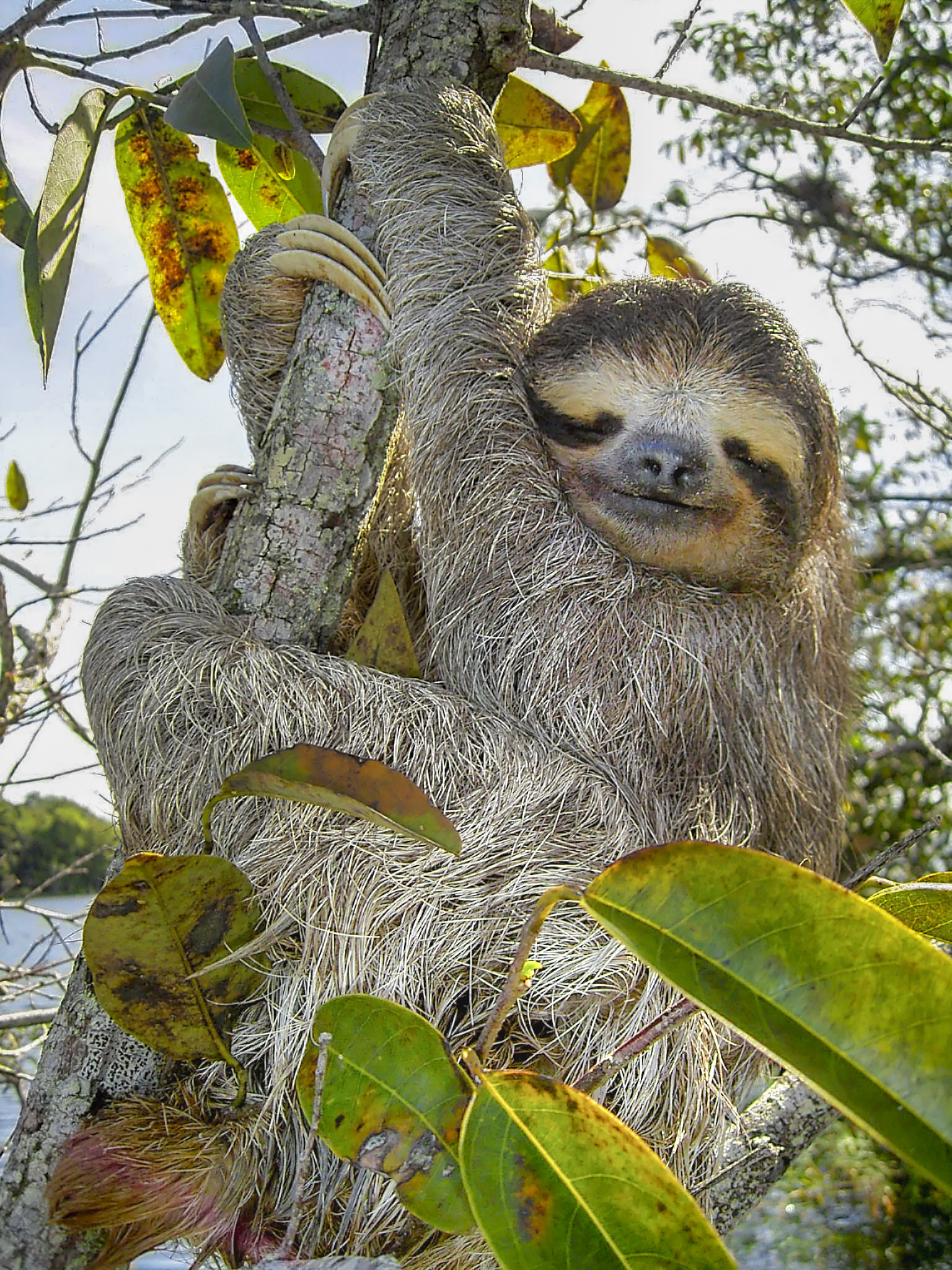

Conservation status
- Least Concern (IUCN 3.1)
- CITES Appendix II

Scientific classification
- Kingdom: Animalia
- Phylum: Chordata
- Class: Mammalia
- Order: Pilosa
- Suborder: Folivora
- Family: Bradypodidae
- Genus: Bradypus
- Species: B. variegatus

Binomial name
- Bradypus variegatus Schinz, 1825

Subspecies
- 7, see text
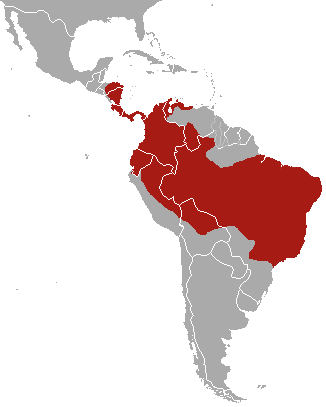
- Brown-throated sloth range

= Brown-throated sloth =

Species of New World mammal

The brown-throated sloth (Bradypus variegatus) is a species of three-toed sloth found in the Neotropical realm of Central and South America.

It is the most common of the five species of three-toed sloth, and is found in the forests of South and Central America in countries such as Bolivia, Brazil, Colombia, Ecuador, Honduras, Nicaragua, Panama, Paraguay, Peru, and Venezuela. Although they once lived in Argentina, they are now believed to be extinct there.

== Description ==
The brown-throated sloth is of similar size and build to most other species of three-toed sloths, with both males and females being 42 to 80 cm (17 to 31 in) in total body length. The tail is relatively short, only 2.5 to 9 cm (1.0 to 3.5 in) long. Adults weigh from 2.25 to 6.3 kg (5.0 to 13.9 lb), with no significant size difference between males and females. Each foot has three fingers, ending in long, curved claws, which are 7 to 8 cm (2.8 to 3.1 in) long on the fore feet, and 5 to 5.5 cm (2.0 to 2.2 in) on the hind feet.

They have long forelimbs with three claws on each and about 10 cervical vertebrae, allowing their necks to rotate up to 270 degrees. Their cylindrical teeth lack enamel. Like many herbivorous mammals, they have multi-chambered stomachs containing microorganisms that help digest cellulose from their plant-based diet. The head is rounded, with a blunt nose and inconspicuous ears. As with other sloths, the brown-throated sloth has no incisor or canine teeth, and the cheek teeth are simple and peg-like. They have no gall bladder, cecum, or appendix.

Brown-throated sloths have brown coloration on their throat and head. Their fur includes a soft inner layer and a thicker, woolly outer layer that often supports algae growth, sometimes giving them a greenish tint. The brown-throated sloth has grayish-brown to beige-color fur over the body, with darker brown fur on the throat, the sides of the face, and the forehead. The face is generally paler in color, with a stripe of very dark fur running beneath the eyes.

The guard hairs are very coarse and stiff, and overlie a much softer layer of dense under-fur. The hairs are unusual in lacking a central medulla, and have numerous microscopic cracks across their surfaces. These cracks are host to a number of commensal species of algae, including Rufusia pillicola, Dictyococcus bradypodis, and Chlorococcum choloepodis. The algae are generally absent in the hair of young sloths, and may also be absent in particularly old individuals, where the outer cuticle of the hair has been lost. Sloth hair also harbours a rich fungal flora. Certain strains of fungi that grow on brown-throated sloth fur have been shown to possess anti-parasitic, anti-cancer, and anti-bacterial qualities.

Over parts of its range, the brown-throated sloth overlaps the range of Hoffmann's two-toed sloth. Where this overlap occurs, the three-toed sloth tends to be smaller and more numerous than its relative, being more active in moving through the forest and maintaining more diurnal activity.

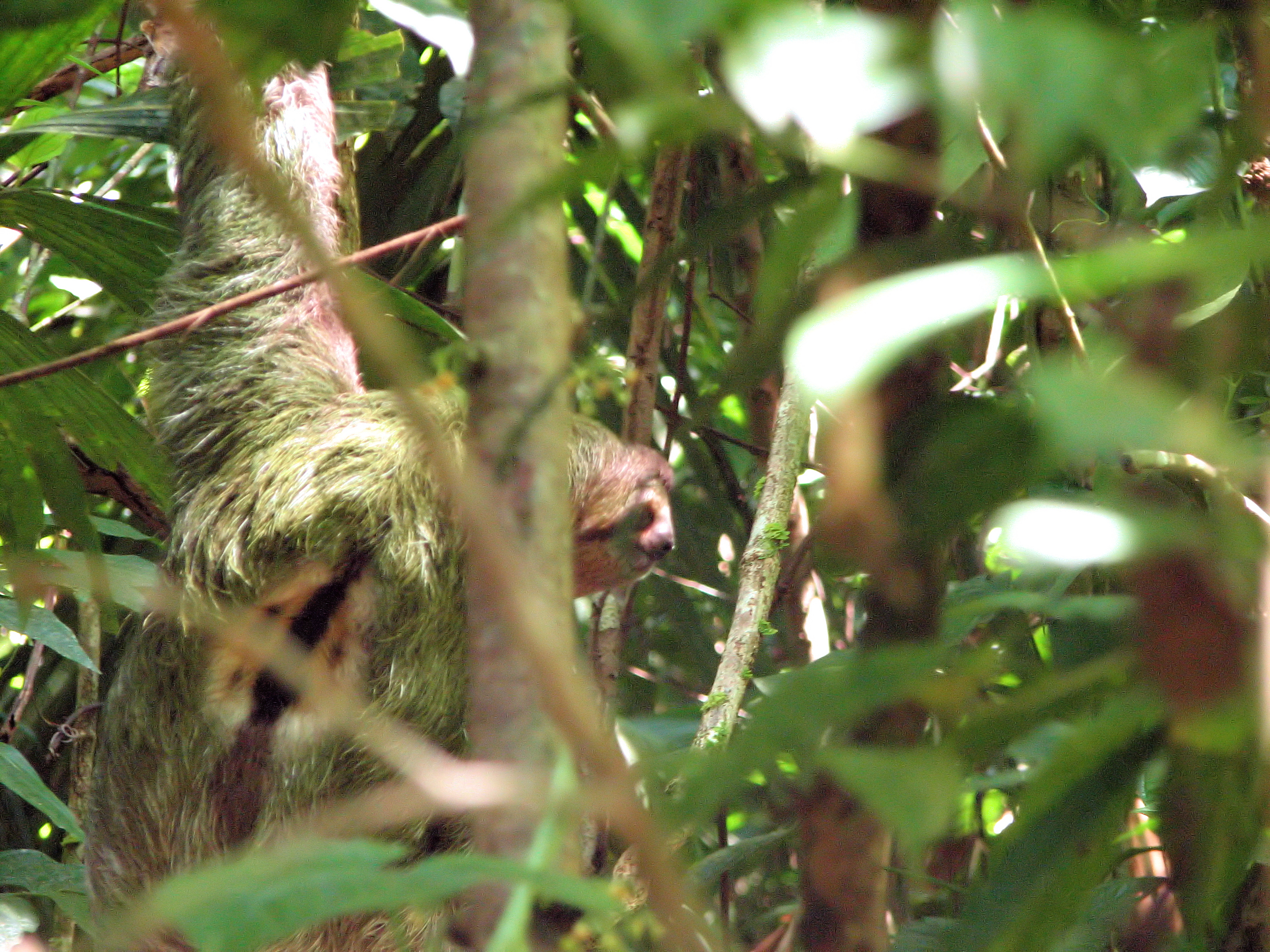
Male showing black patch between shoulders

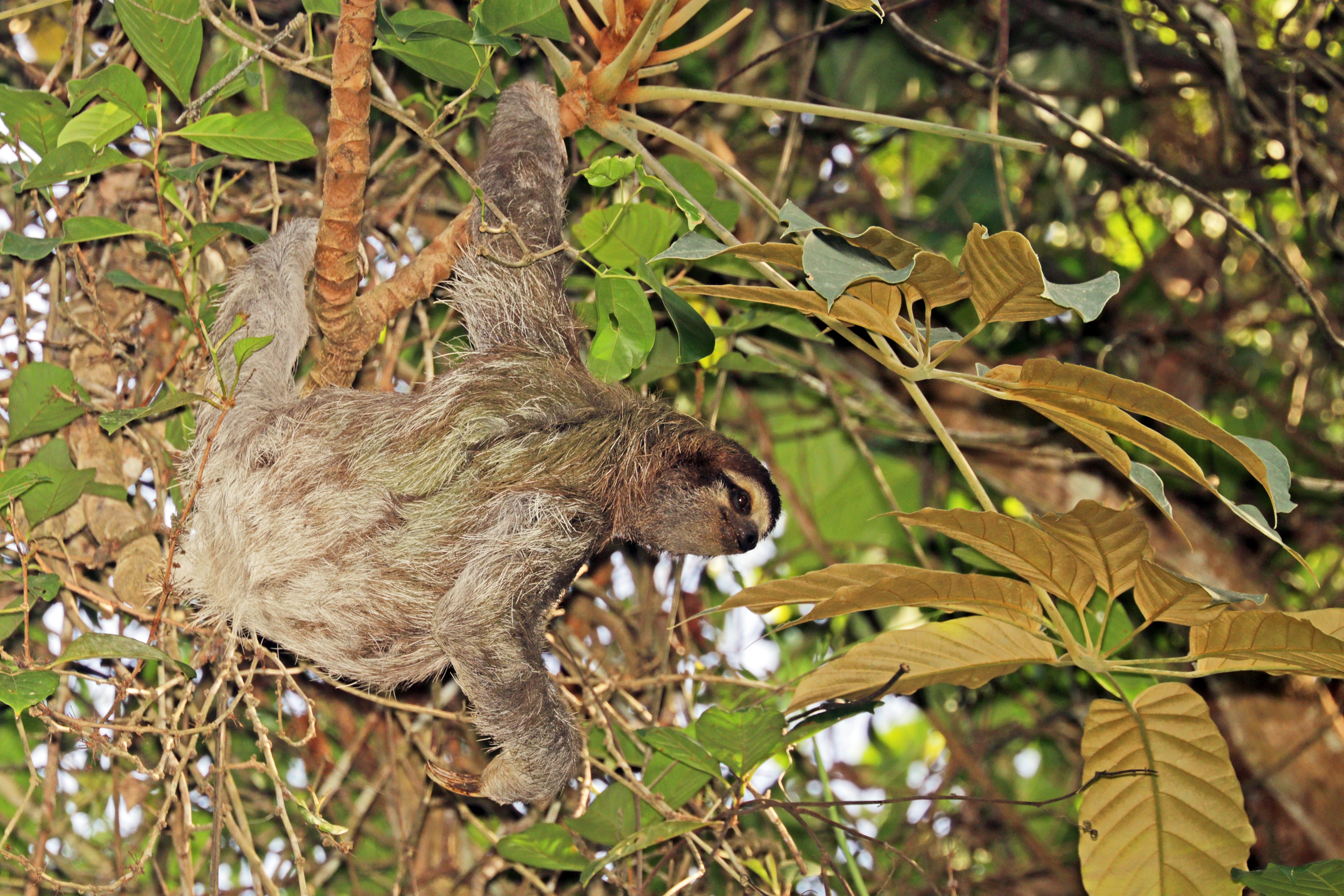
female

== Distribution and habitat ==
The brown-throated sloth is the most widespread and common of the three-toed sloths. It is found from Honduras in the north, through Nicaragua, Costa Rica and Panama into Venezuela, Colombia, Ecuador, Bolivia, Brazil and eastern Peru. It is probably not found immediately north of the Amazon rainforest or east of the Rio Negro, although its similarity to the pale-throated sloth found in these regions has led to some confusion in the past.

It is found in many different kinds of environments, including evergreen and dry forests and in highly perturbed natural areas. Brown-throated three-toed sloths live in a range of tropical environments, including rainforests, semi-deciduous forests, subtropical lowlands, and swamps. They spend most of their lives in the forest canopy, rarely come to the ground, and are strong swimmers. It is generally found from sea level to 1,200 m (3,900 ft), although some individuals have been reported from much higher elevations. Although they do not prefer specific tree species, they often choose trees with sun-exposed crowns, likely to help regulate their body temperature.

== Behaviour and diet ==
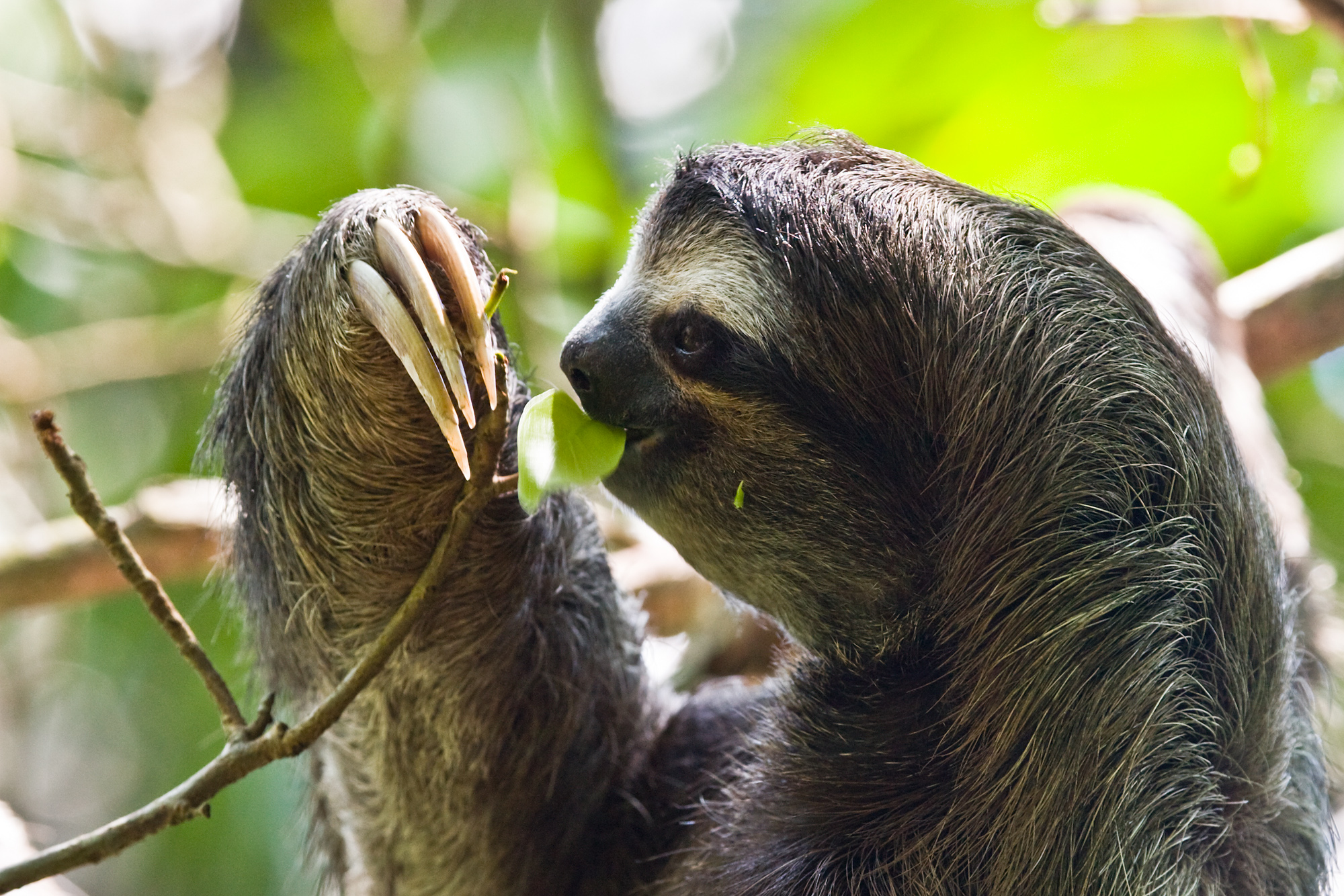
Feeding brown-throated sloth (Bradypus variegatus), Cahuita National Park, Costa Rica

Brown-throated sloths sleep 15 to 18 hours every day and are active for only brief periods of time, which may be during either the day or night. They are most active from 12:00 to 18:00 and typically sleep between 06:00 and 12:00. They have two resting states: an “awake-alert” state with eyes open and blinking, and a “behavioral sleep” state with eyes closed while still hanging from a tree. Although they can walk along the ground, and even swim, they spend most of their lives in the high branches of trees, descending once every eight days or so to defecate in the soil. The brown-throated sloths are cathemeral, with no preference for sleeping at day or night. Large, curved claws and muscles specifically adapted for strength and stamina help them to keep a strong grip on tree branches. They are able to withstand hanging inverted for extended periods of time due to fibrinous adhesions which attach their organs (such as their liver and stomach) to their lower ribs. Given that feces and urine can account for up to a third of their body weight, this adaptation prevents these organs from pressing on the lungs when hanging upside down, making breathing easier. Adult animals are solitary, except when raising young, and males have been observed to fight one another using their fore claws.

Brown-throated sloths inhabit the high canopy of the forest, where they eat young leaves from a wide range of different trees (primarily in the genus Cecropia, e.g., C. schreberiana), as well as flowers and fruits. They do not travel far, with home ranges of only around 0.5 to 9 ha (1.2 to 22.2 acres), depending on the local environment. Within a typical, 5-hectare (12-acre) range, a brown-throated sloth will visit around 40 trees, and may specialise on one particular species, even spending up to 20% of its time in a single specific tree. Thus, although the species are generalists, individual sloths may feed on a relatively narrow range of leaf types. Although they get most of their fluids from the leaves that they eat, brown-throated sloths have been observed drinking directly from rivers. Bradypus variegatus is a strict herbivore that primarily feeds on trees in the genus Cecropia (such as embauba). It eats leaves, flowers, and fruits from these trees. This species obtains most of its water from the plants it consumes and only drinks occasionally.

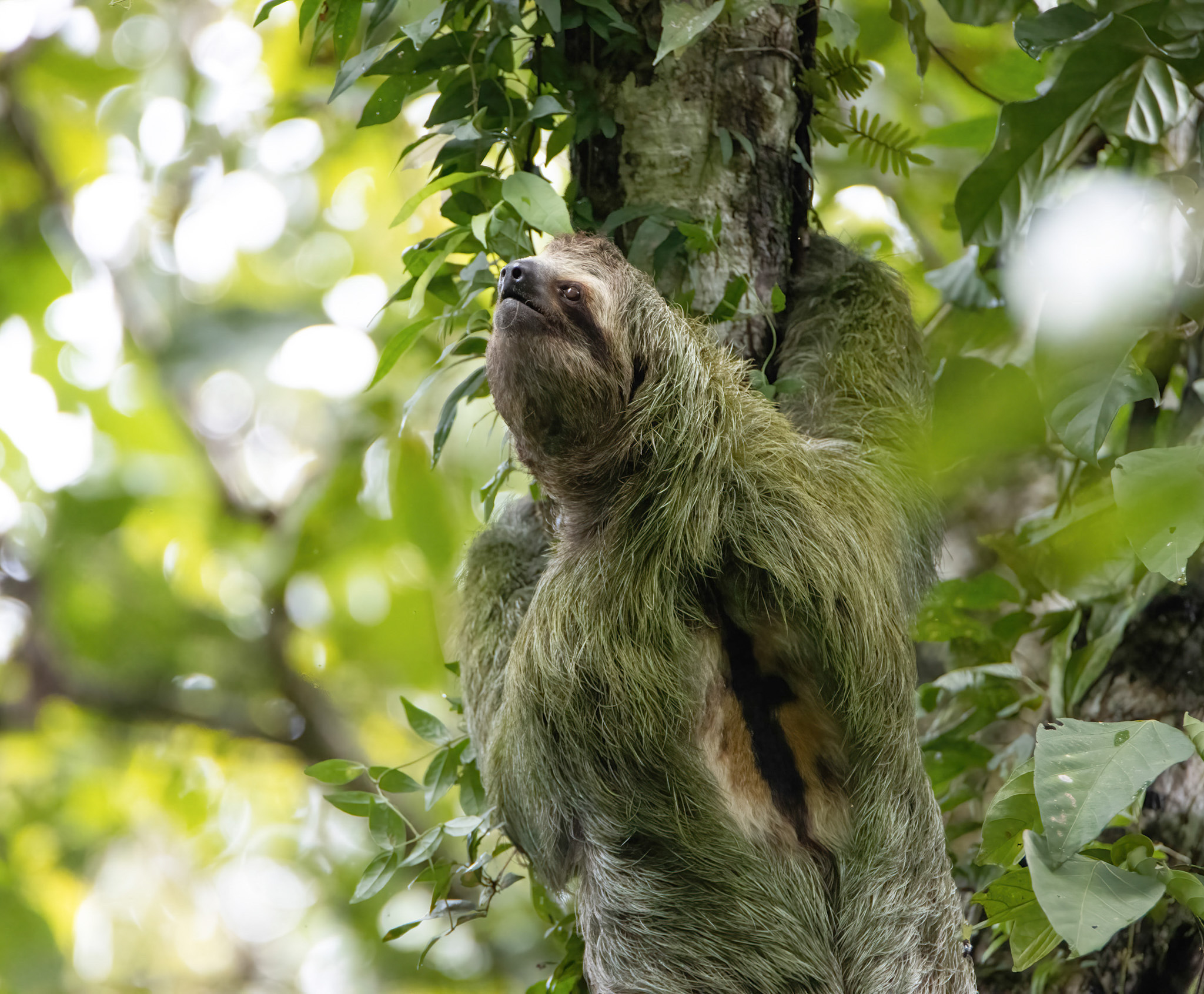
Brown-throated sloth at midday in Manuel Antonio National Park, Costa Rica

Sloths descend about once every eight days to defecate on the ground. The reason and mechanism behind this behavior have long been debated among scientists. There are at least five hypotheses: 1) fertilize trees when feces are deposited at the base of the tree; 2) cover feces and avoid predation; 3) chemical communication between individuals; 4) pick up trace nutrients in their claws, that are then ingested; and 5) favor a mutualistic relationship with populations of fur moths. More recently, a new hypothesis has emerged, which presents evidence against the previous ones and proposes that all current sloths are descendants from species that defecated on the ground, and there simply has not been enough selective pressure to abandon this behavior, since cases of predation during defecation are actually very rare.

In addition to the algae in their fur, brown-throated sloths also live commensally with a species of moth, Cryptoses choloepi, which lives in their fur, and lays its eggs in the dung. Jaguars and harpy eagles are among the few natural predators of the brown-throated sloth. The yellow-headed caracara has been observed to forage for small invertebrates in the fur of the sloths, apparently without the sloth being disturbed by the attention.

The female of the species is known to emit a loud, shrill scream during the mating season to attract males. Its cry sounds like "ay ay", much like that of a woman screaming. The male can be identified by a black stripe surrounded by orange fur on its back between the shoulders.

== Reproduction ==
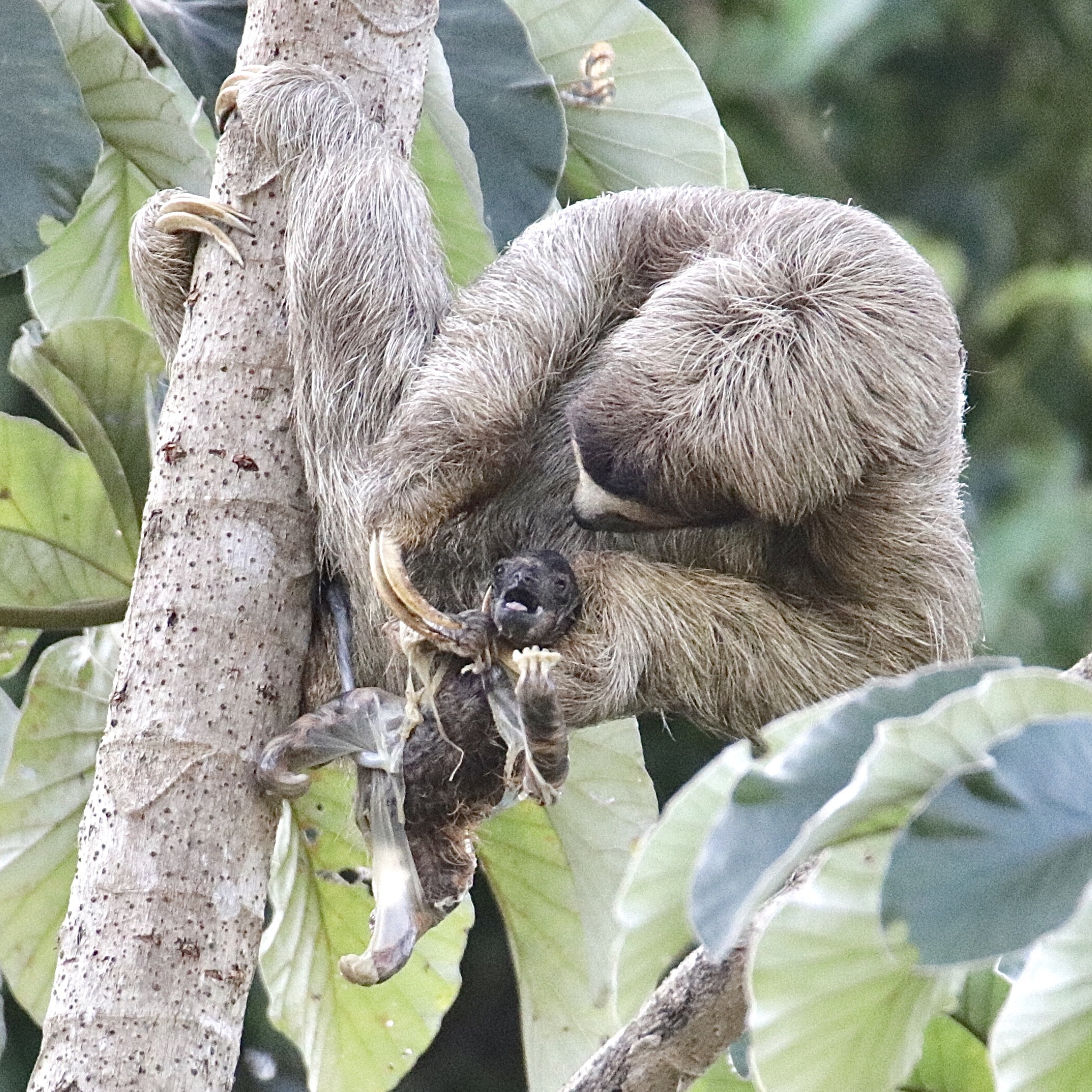
Brown-throated sloth with a stillborn cub

Brown-throated three-toed sloths are believed to be monogamous. When ready to mate, females vocalize to attract males and usually breed with the first male they encounter. Although a specific breeding season has not been confirmed, mating appears to occur just before the rainy season. Copulation lasts about 10–15 minutes and typically takes place in the female’s tree, around 15 meters above the ground. After mating, males leave and provide no parental care. Females give birth to a single offspring once per year after a gestation period of 5–8 months. They do not build nests or prepare for birth. Offspring are born either in trees or on the ground, and the mother pulls the infant between her hind legs during delivery. Other sloths may assist by cleaning the mother and infant and helping prevent the newborn from falling. Newborns weigh under 1 kg and cling to their mother’s underside for protection, especially from predators. Young are weaned at about four months and become independent afterward. Females reach sexual maturity around age three, while males mature between three and five years, averaging about four years. Mothers support their young’s motor skills, posture, and exploration, while paternal care is absent in this species. Brown-throated sloths have a polygynous mating system. Studies of the brown-throated sloth indicate that mating is most common between January and March in at least the northern parts of its range, but this may vary elsewhere. Gestation lasts at least seven months, and the single young is born fully furred and clawed. Young sloths cling to the mother's underside for five months or more, even though they are fully weaned after just four to five weeks.

The mammary glands of the females do not store significant quantities of milk as most other mammals do, since the infant sloth remains attached to the nipple at all times, and consumes the milk as soon as it is generated. The young begin to take solid food as early as four days after birth, initially licking particles of food from their mother's mouths. This process apparently allows them to quickly identify edible leaves, and young sloths typically have the same preferences for leaf types as their mothers.

In the wild, the lifespan of adult brown-throated three-toed sloths is typically between 30 and 40 years.

== Taxonomy ==
The brown-throated sloth was first described by Heinrich Rudolf Schinz in 1825 from a South American specimen. The type locality was later specified as "probably Bahia (Brazil)" by Robert Mertens in 1925.

The seven recognized subspecies of the brown-throated sloth, although these are not all readily distinguishable, are:

- B. v. boliviensis Gray, 1871 Western Amazon
- B. v. brasiliensis Blainville, 1840 Southern Atlantic Forest in coastal Brazil
- B. v. ephippiger Philippi, 1870 The Trans-Andean regions of Central America
- B. v. gorgon Thomas, 1926 Gorgona Island, off the Pacific coast of Colombia
- B. v. infuscatus Wagler, 1831 Western Amazon
- B. v. trivittatus Cornalia, 1849 Western Amazon, with records in the Brazilian state of Pará
- B. v. variegatus Schinz, 1825 Northern Atlantic Forest and southeastern Brazil

The closest living relative of the species is the pale-throated sloth, which has a very similar appearance, except for the color of the fur around the throat. The two species are estimated to have diverged just 400,000 years ago, whereas their ancestors diverged from the maned sloth over 7 million years ago.
