= Natural Science Museum of Valencia =

Museum in Valencia, Spain

Natural Science Museum
- Museo de Ciencias Naturales
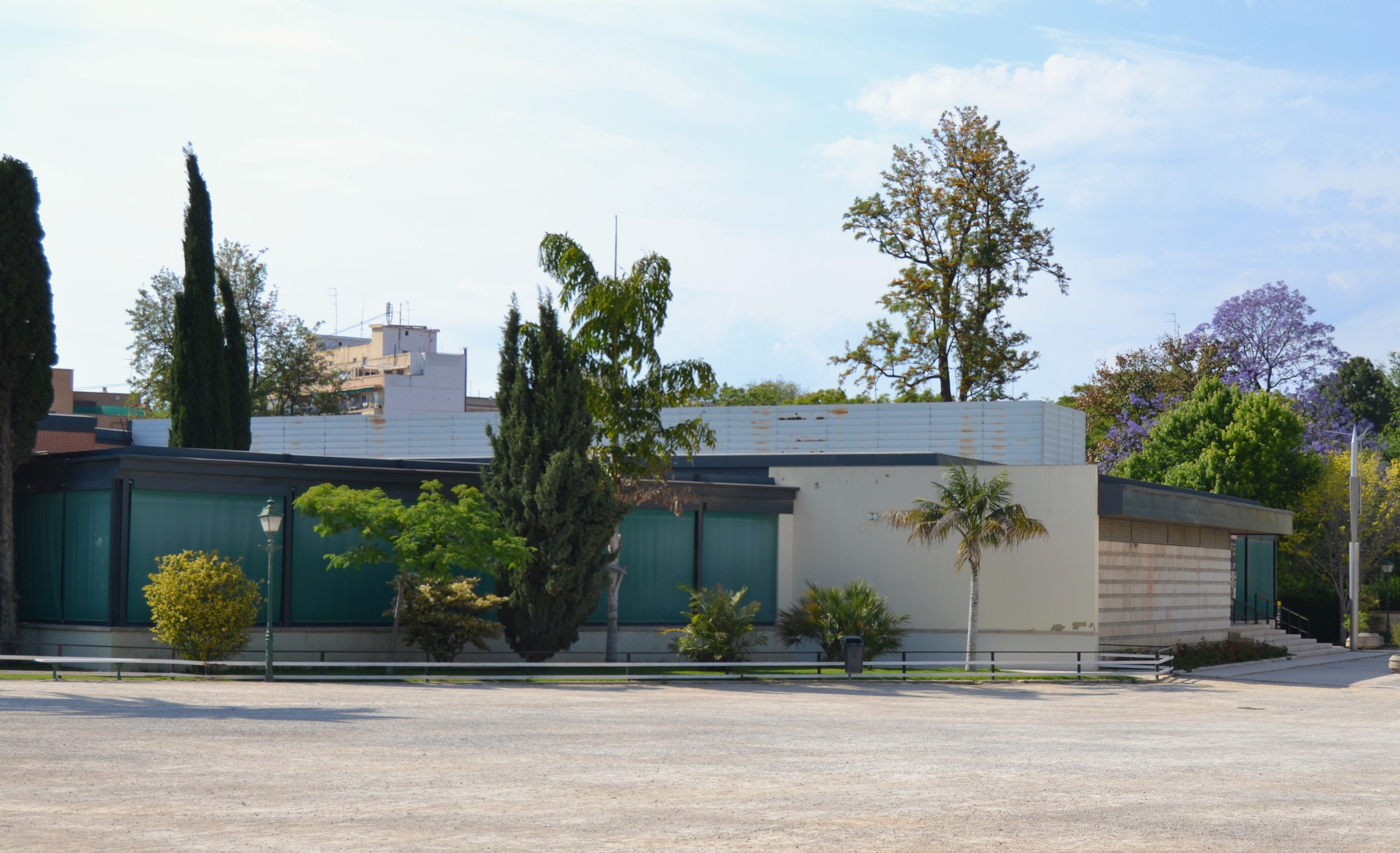
- Exterior of the Natural Science Museum.
- Established: 1999
- Location: Avenida del General Elío, s/n (Jardins del Real), Valencia, Spain.
- Coordinates: 39.479331°N 0.368939°W
- Director: Margarita Belinchón

The Natural Science Museum of Valencia (Spain) is located at Jardines del Real (Municipal Garden Centre).

== History ==
The present Natural Science Museum of Valencia has its origin in the Palaeontological Municipal Museum, established in 1889 in the demolished San Gregorio's Convent located in San Vicente Street in the current Olympia Theatre. This museum was created thanks to the engineer José Rodrigo Bolet, who generously donated his private collection. He was born in Manises in 1842, but emigrated to Argentina in 1875, where he led civil engineering projects and took part in hydraulic works in Brazil, the Andes and Patagonia. Besides that, he was involved in the design and planning of La Plata city and the port of La Campana, which he also built. On July 14, 1889, he left Argentina with his enormous paleontological collection aboard the ship Mateo Bruzzo, arriving at the port of Barcelona in the midst of great expectation. A special train was chartered to transport the valuable collection to Valencia, arriving the evening of August 9. The collection is made up of a large number of mammal fossils belonging to the South American Quaternary, including a human skeleton called Samborombón considered to be the star of the collection. It was the focus of a great amount of scientific discussions in the early 20th century due to the postulate of the tertiary antiquity of the origin of mankind. He was accompanied by Enrique De Carles, the main fossil collector and naturalist technician of the Museum of Buenos Aires. He was the main person in charge of the mounting of the skeletons until his early departure in June 1890, when the city of Valencia suffered the last cholera outbreak. It was this year when the collection was moved from the San Gregorio's Convent to a municipal property located at number 62 of Ruzafa Street, where it remained temporarily until 1896. The collection was placed in an old Jesuit building, the San Pablo's Hospital, next to the Alquería de Julià, far from the historical center.

In 1904, José Rodrigo Botet, the main donor of the museum's collection, died in Madrid. Eduardo Boscá Casanoves (1843–1924), senior gardener of the Botanical Garden of the University of Valencia, with firm evolutionary beliefs, becomes the first director of the Municipal Museum of Paleontology, and together with the exhibition fitter Carlos Maicas, they continued the work with the skeletons that Enrique de Carles started. With the celebration of the IV Centenary of the University of Valencia in 1902, the City Council of Valencia decided to exhibit the collection to the general public for the first time. San Pablo's Hospital building turned out to be inefficient for the conservation and exhibition of the collection. For this reason, the City Council of Valencia proposed the execution of a new building that would be located in Pla del Real (Llano del Real in Spanish) whose purpose would be Botet's collection to exhibit it to the public. The new building, which was planned to be named as the Valencian Palace of Natural Sciences, never was built due to lack of funding. Instead, the collection was deposited in a new location at Almodí building (Almudín in Spanish), an old 14th century corn exchange located in the heart of the historic district of Valencia — just a few meters from the Cathedral and which currently has an exhibition hall. The new location allowed the paleontological collection to be visited by the general public, opening in 1908 as the Municipal Museum of Paleontology. In 1924 Eduardo Boscá Casanoves, first director of the museum, and one of the greatest advocates of the social broadcasting of Botet's paleontological collection, died. That same year he was succeeded by Don Francisco Beltrán Bigorra, who expanded the museum's collections with an enormous malacological collection donated by Eduardo Roselló Bru in 1925. For the following decades, the museum remained open to the public at this location, so that the Almudín building became a synonym of Paleontology Museum, until torrential rains in 1989 accelerated the deterioration of the building, which was declared dilapidated. Authorities evicted the collection in the face of the danger of collapse, without a precedent in Europe of a transfer of that magnitude since the Second World War. The collection was moved to the ground floor of the town hall, in the old Municipal Exhibition Hall, and first opened on 2 July 1991. During 1996, the City Council approved a rehabilitation project for the old Viveros restaurant and the creation of the Natural Science Museum that would host the collection of the Museum of Paleontology. To boost the didactic value of the collections, a project that respected the most current museographic tendencies was developed. In 1999 the current Museum of Natural Sciences of Valencia was opened — at the same location where the City Council projected the construction of the Valencian Palace of Natural Sciences at the beginning of the 20th century.

== Building ==
The rationalist building, which the Museum of Natural Sciences currently takes in, corresponds to the former luxury restaurant Restaurante Viveros. This building was built in the late 1950s, and was designed by the Valencian architect Luis Gay, whose work was influenced by the architect Ludwig Mies van der Rohe, precursor of the Bauhaus. The building is considered a unique building and has a grade 2 listed building

== Collections ==
Rodrigo Botet's collection is possibly the best European collection of fossils from the South American Pleistocene, consisting of twenty skeletons and more than five thousand bones belonging to more than twenty different mammal families.

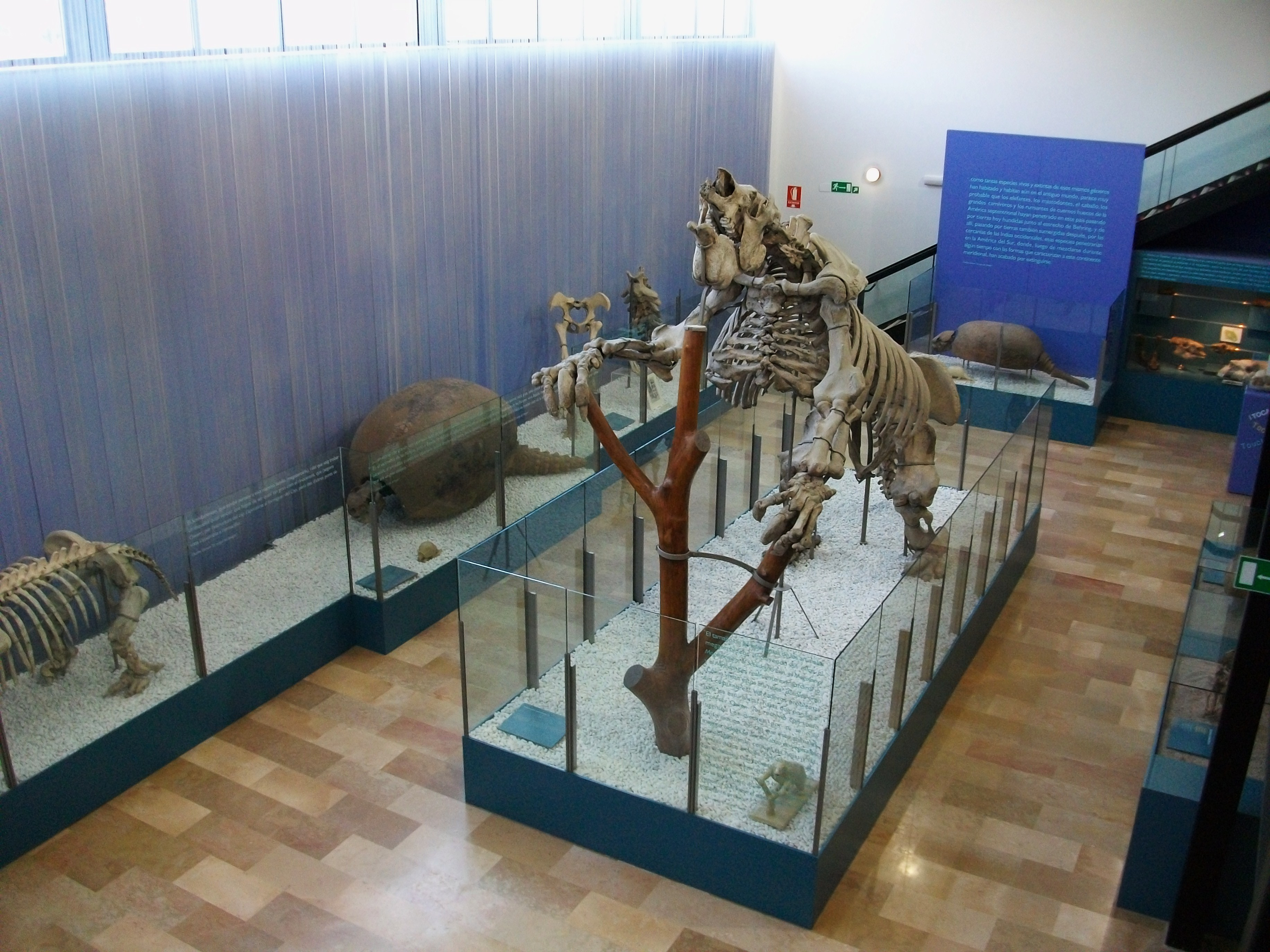
Inside view of the Museum. The skeleton in the center of the room is Megatherium americanum

== Museum galleries ==
1. Science and Technology: This room is dedicated to the history of science and contains the first electronic microscope of Valencia, acquired in 1966 by the Institute of Cytological Research, now the Valencian Foundation for Biomedical Research. The recreation of a scientific cabinet of the 19th century, similar to that of Santiago Ramón y Cajal, stands out.
2. Biodiversity: A room for the description and dissemination of Valencian biodiversity. It includes a virtual visit to the natural spaces of El Saler and La Devesa.
3. Origin of Life: Paleozoic.
4. Rodrigo Botet Paleontological Collection: In this room, where the Rodrigo Botet collection is exhibited, is the most representative and spectacular example of the museum, a complete skeleton of a six-meter-long elephant- sized ground sloth Megatherium americanum. Other ground sloths are also exhibited including Scelidotherium, Scelidodon and Glossotherium. Also found in this room are the skeletons of a saber-toothed tiger (Smilodon populator) and several giant armadillos, among which the most outstanding ones are an Eutatus seguini, as well as the glyptodonts Neosclerocalyptus and a Glyptodon clavipes. The specimens from Rodrigo Botet's collection are mentioned by Charles R. Darwin in his work the Origin of Species, which made the collection highly sought after by prestigious European museums of the time.
5. Mesozoic and Cenozoic
6. Dinosaurs of the Valencian Community
7. Sites of the Valencian continental Neogene: In the museum we can find the skull of a 5 million year old sirenia found in Pilar de la Horadada (Alicante), belonging to the genus Metaxytherium, the group of the current dugongs.
8. Malacology: A part of the collection donated in 1925 by Eduardo Roselló Bru is exhibited in this room.
9. Ecosystems and city birds
10. Beekeeping
11. Temporary exhibitions

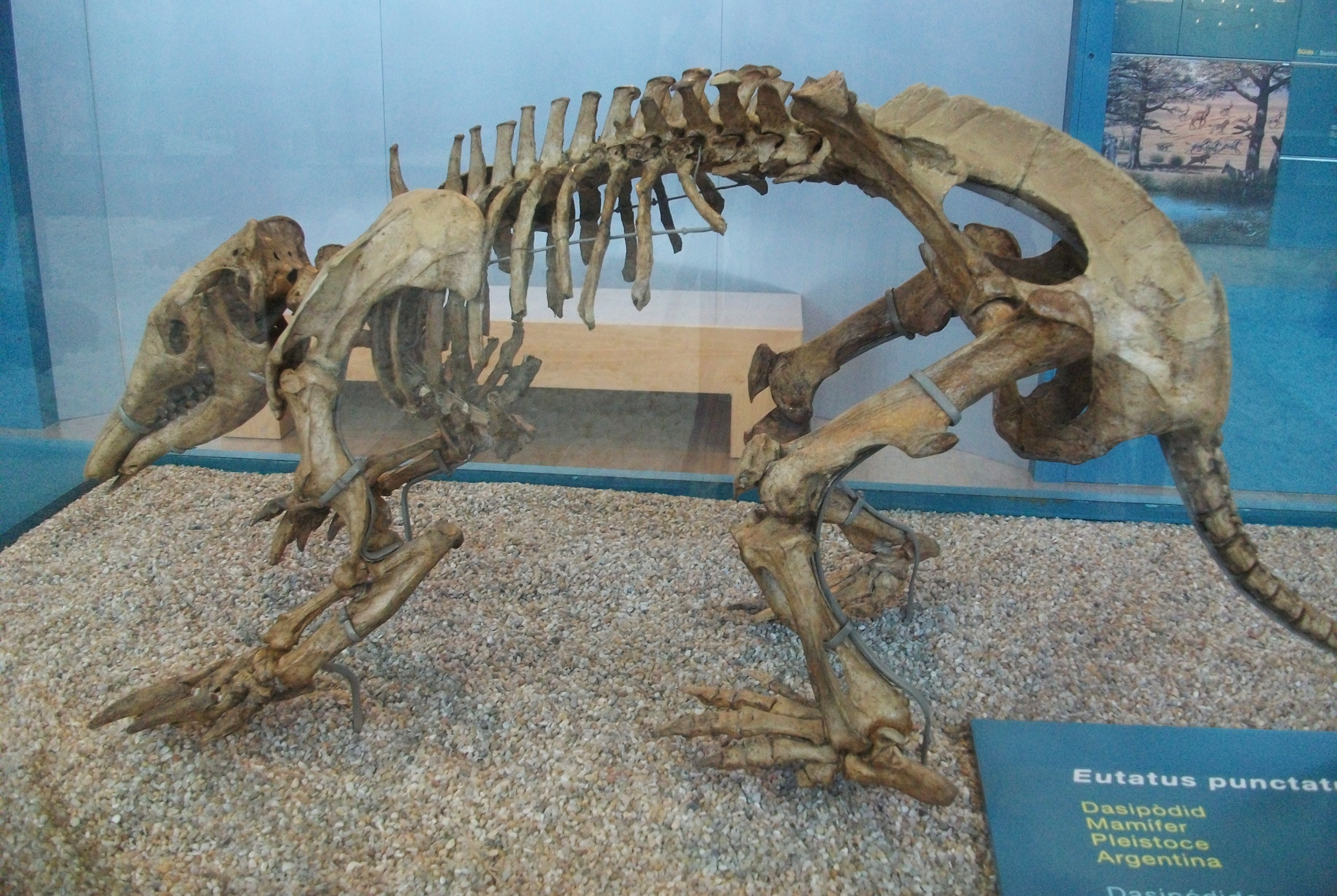
Eutatus skeleton in the Museum of Natural Sciences of Valencia.

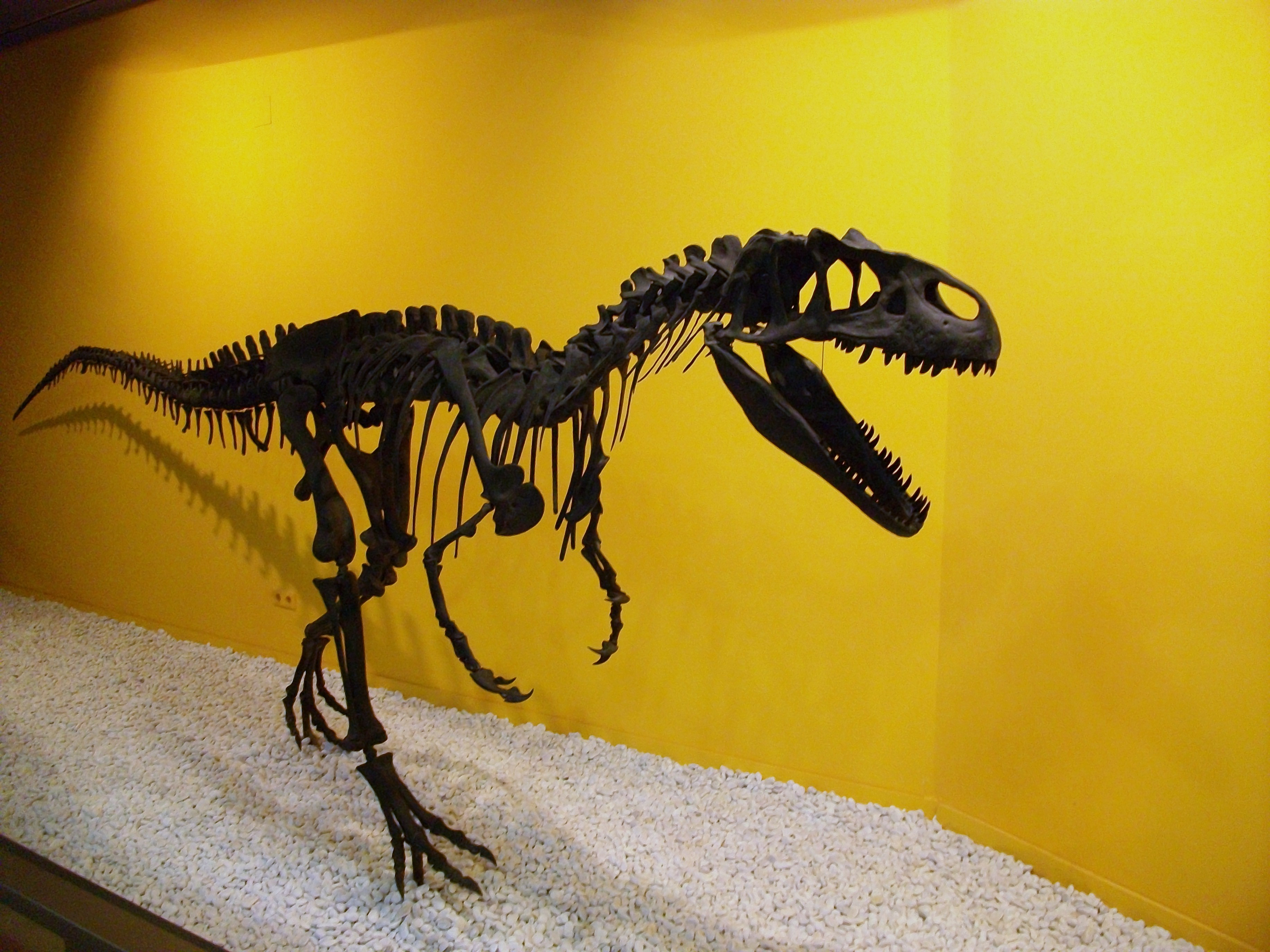
Skeleton of Allosaurus fragilis in the Museum of Natural Sciences of Valencia.

== Areas ==
It consists of four distinct areas:

1. The Valencian contribution to Natural Sciences.
2. The History of life, a journey through the different eras into which the age of the Earth is usually divided. Also on display in this area is the Museum's most important paleontological collection, which is the legacy of J. Rodrigo Botet, a fabulous example of Quaternary paleontology from South America. Of particular importance is the specimen of Megaterio, an emblematic piece of the Museum;
3. Malacology, an interesting collection of mollusk shells, which is a complete representation of the malacological fauna of the Valencian Community.
4. Valencian ecosystems.

The municipality of Valencia has great wealth and variety of ecosystems. It is very difficult to find in the same space, a city of almost a million inhabitants, a riverbank ecosystem, the sea, a vegetable garden with high agricultural productivity and the nuclei of greatest naturalistic value of the Parc Natural de l'Albufera de València (Valencian Albufera Nature Park), such as the Albufera and the Devesa.
