= National Museum of Natural Sciences, Madrid =

Natural history museum in Madrid, Spain

National Museum of Natural Sciences
- Museo Nacional de Ciencias Naturales
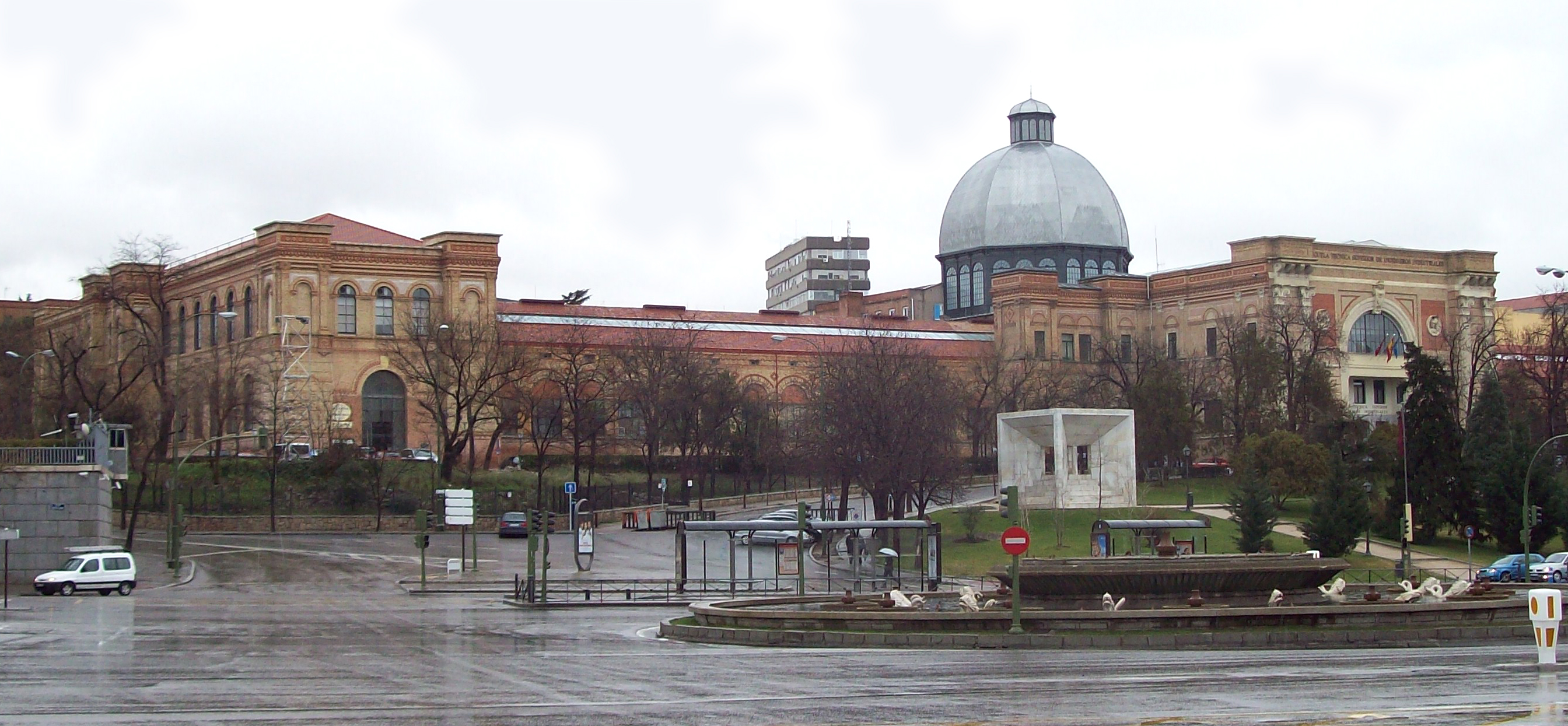
- Museum's building
- Established: 1771
- Location: Madrid, Spain
- Coordinates: 40.441036°N 3.690292°W
- Type: Natural history museum
- Visitors: 500,000 per year
- Director: Rafael Zardoya
- Website: www.mncn.csic.es

The National Museum of Natural Sciences (Spanish: Museo Nacional de Ciencias Naturales) is a natural history museum in Madrid, Spain. Dependent on the Ministry of Science, it is one of the National Museums of Spain, and it is managed by the Spanish National Research Council (CSIC).

== History ==
The museum traces back its origin to the Real Gabinete de Historia Natural, created in 1771 by Charles III. The gabinete was refounded as Real Museo de Historia Natural in 1815. It changed names until its current denomination, received in 1913. The museum originally hosted a collection donated by a Spanish merchant, Pedro F. Dávila. In 1867, some facilities were separated to give birth to other museums (Archeology, Botanic Garden, Zoologic Garden). In 1987 the museum was restructured and enlarged with funds from two smaller museums.

== Collection ==
Some of the more relevant components of the museum collections are:

- The holotype specimen of Megatherium americanum, brought from Argentina in 1789.
- A Diplodocus donated by Andrew Carnegie to Alfonso XIII of Spain in 1913.

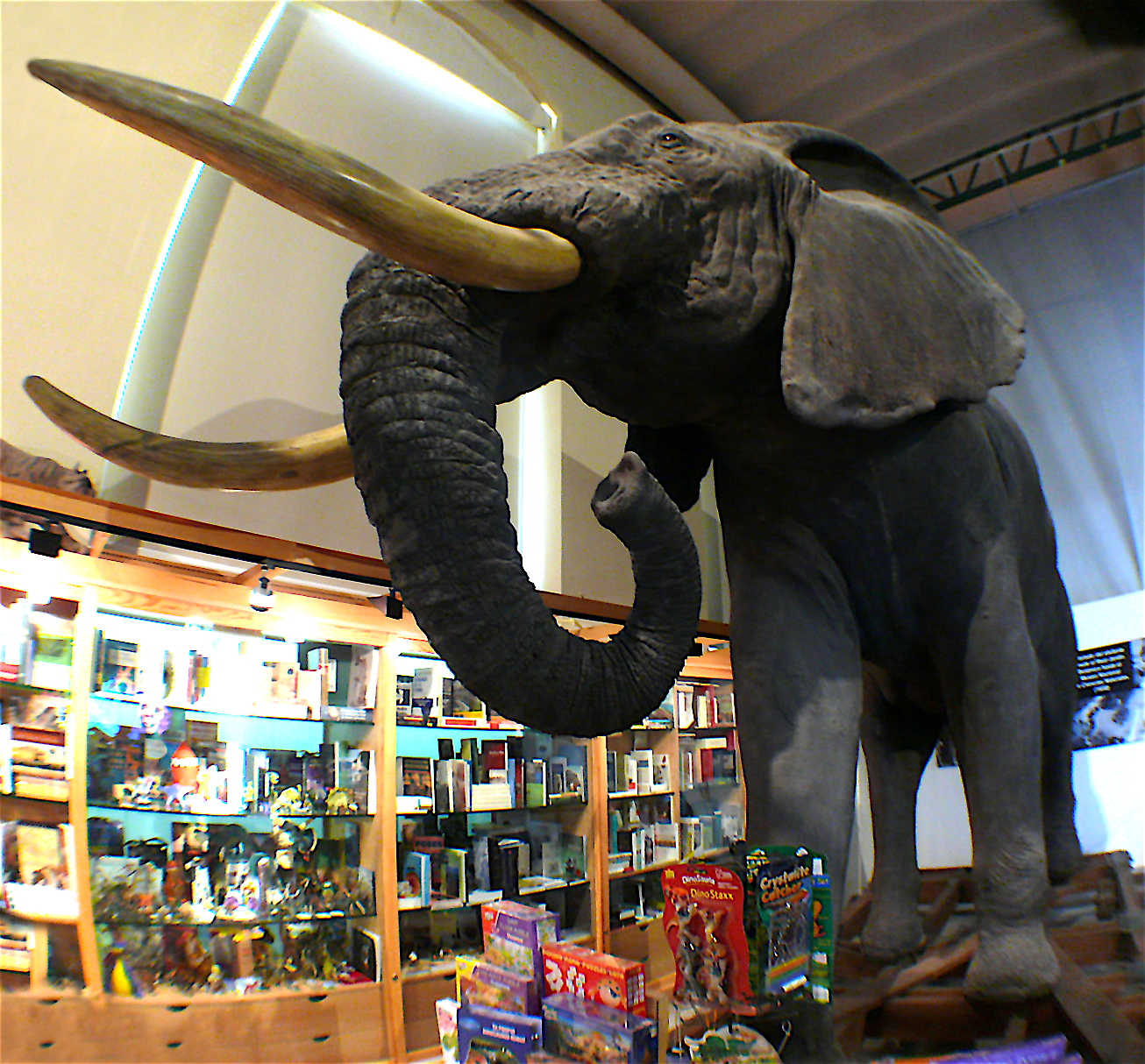
African elephant hunted by Jacobo Fitz-James Stuart, 17th Duke of Alba

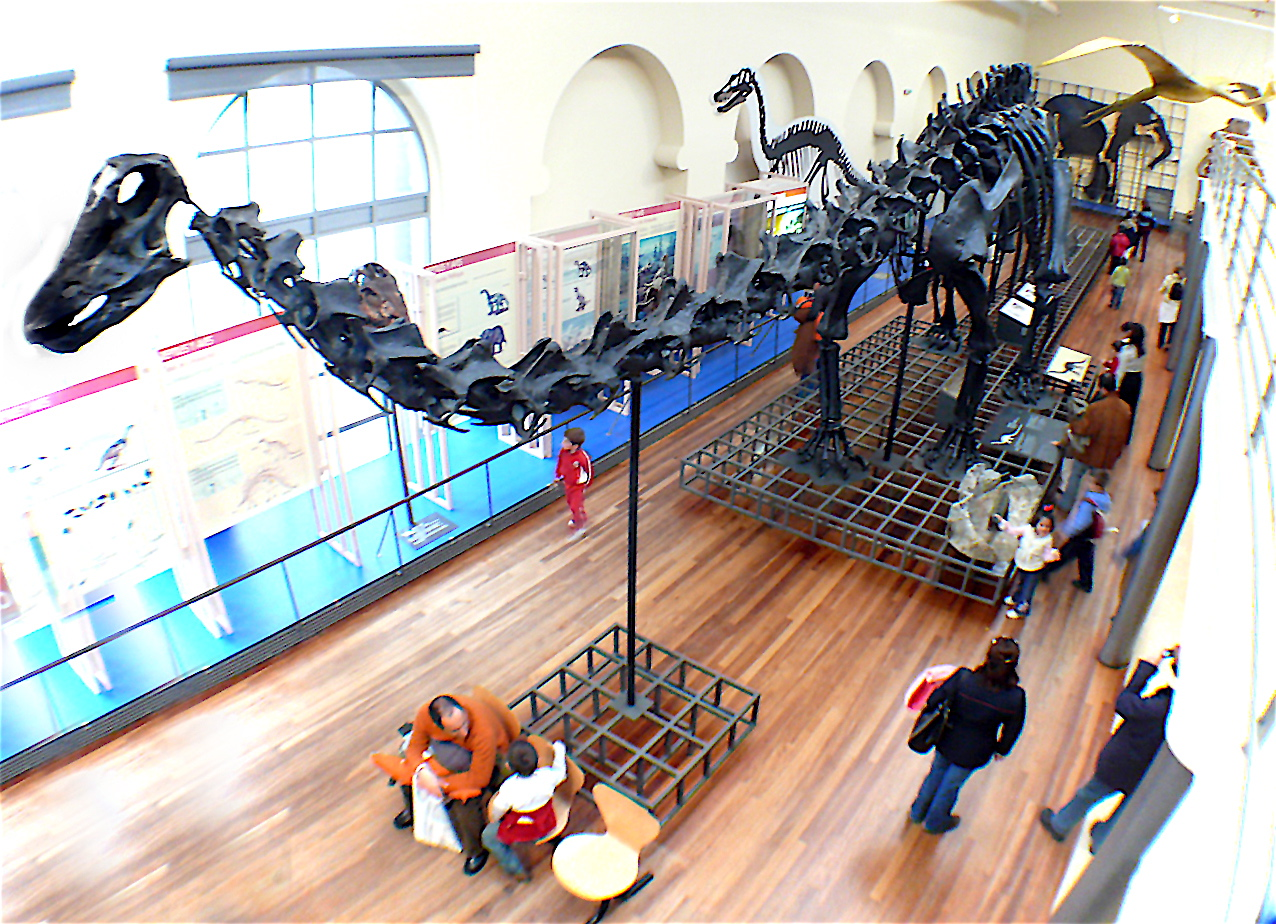
Section of Natural History
Diplodocus and other fossils

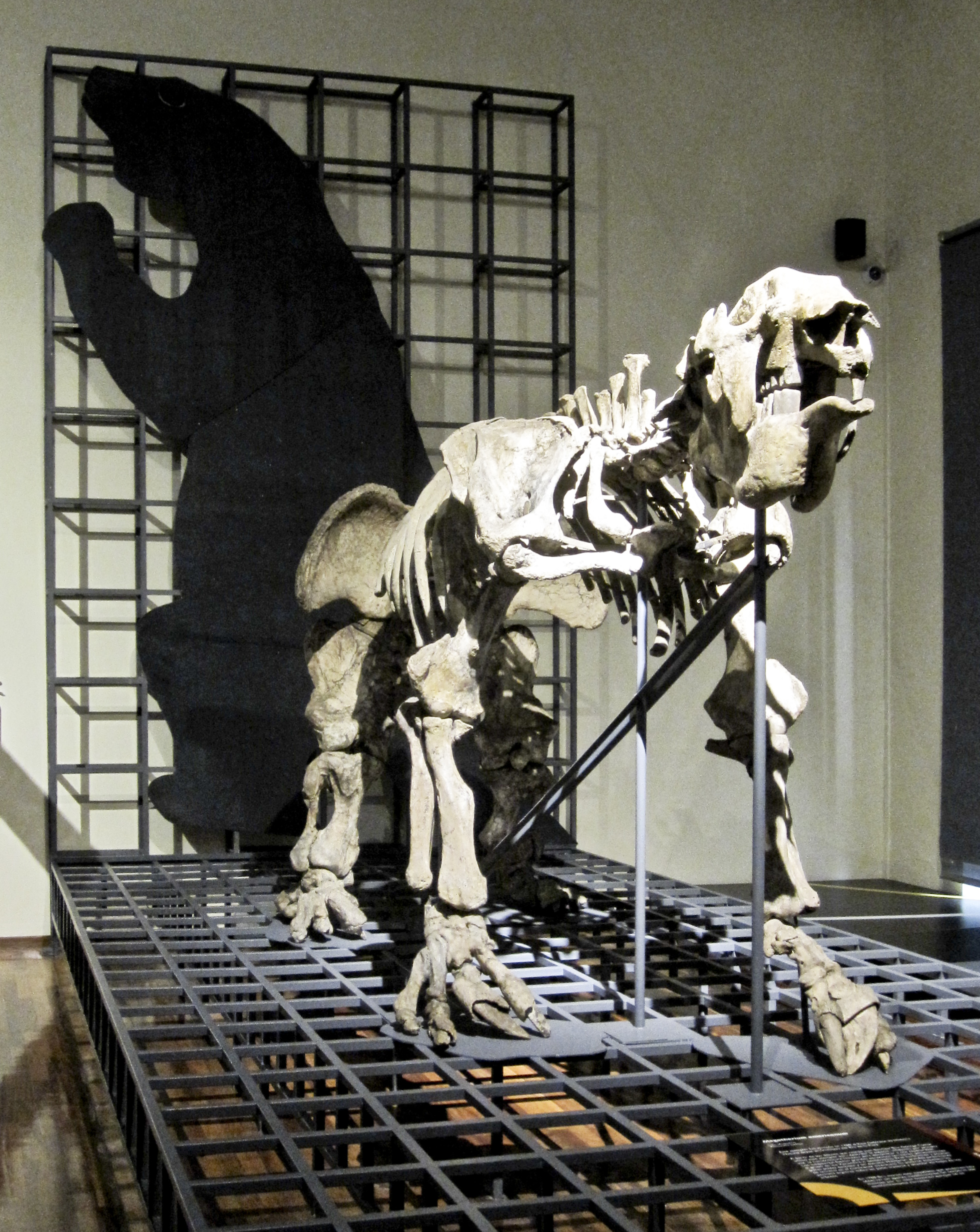
Section of Natural History
Megatherium skeleton

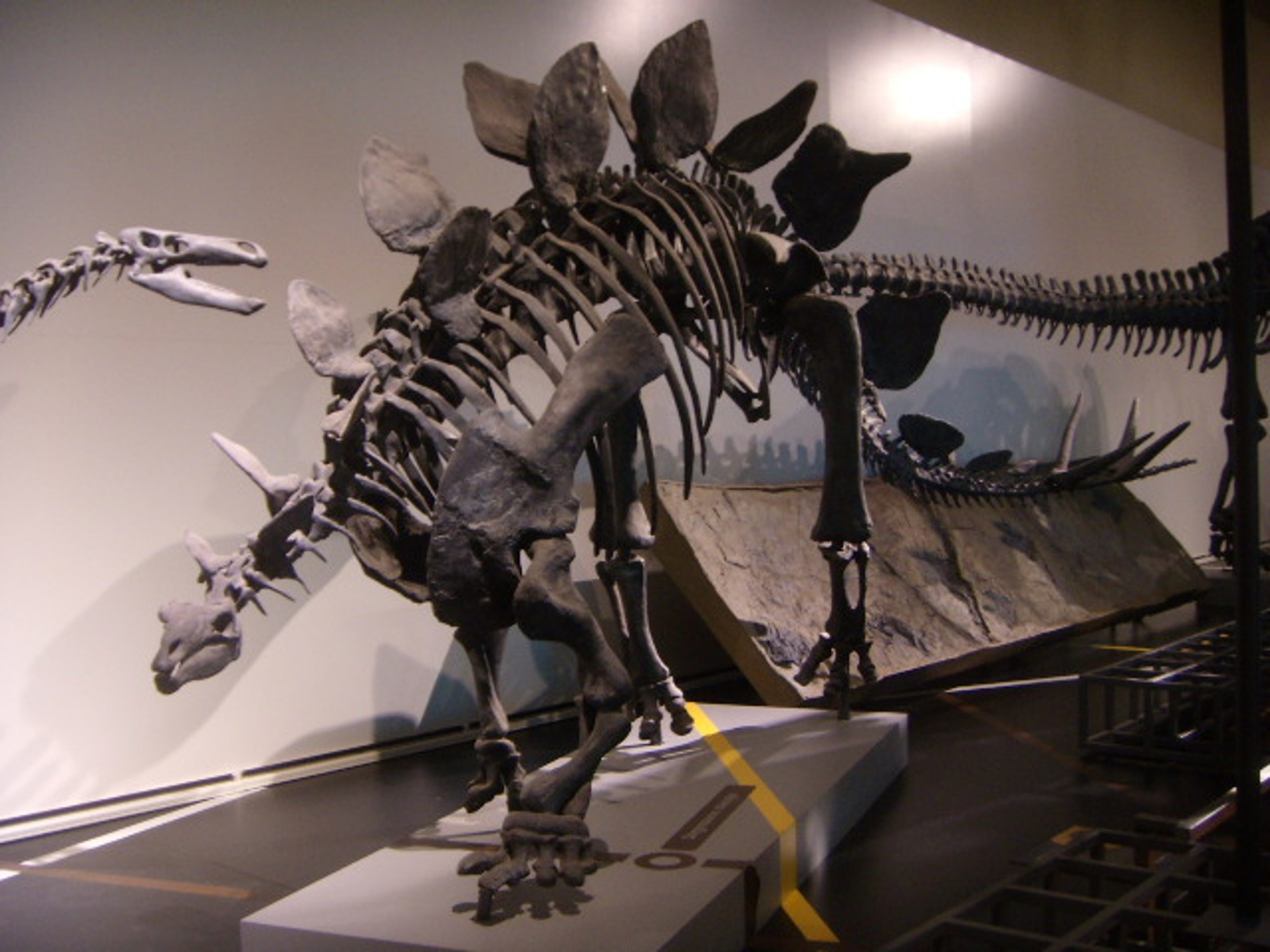
Section of Natural History
Stegosaurus skeleton

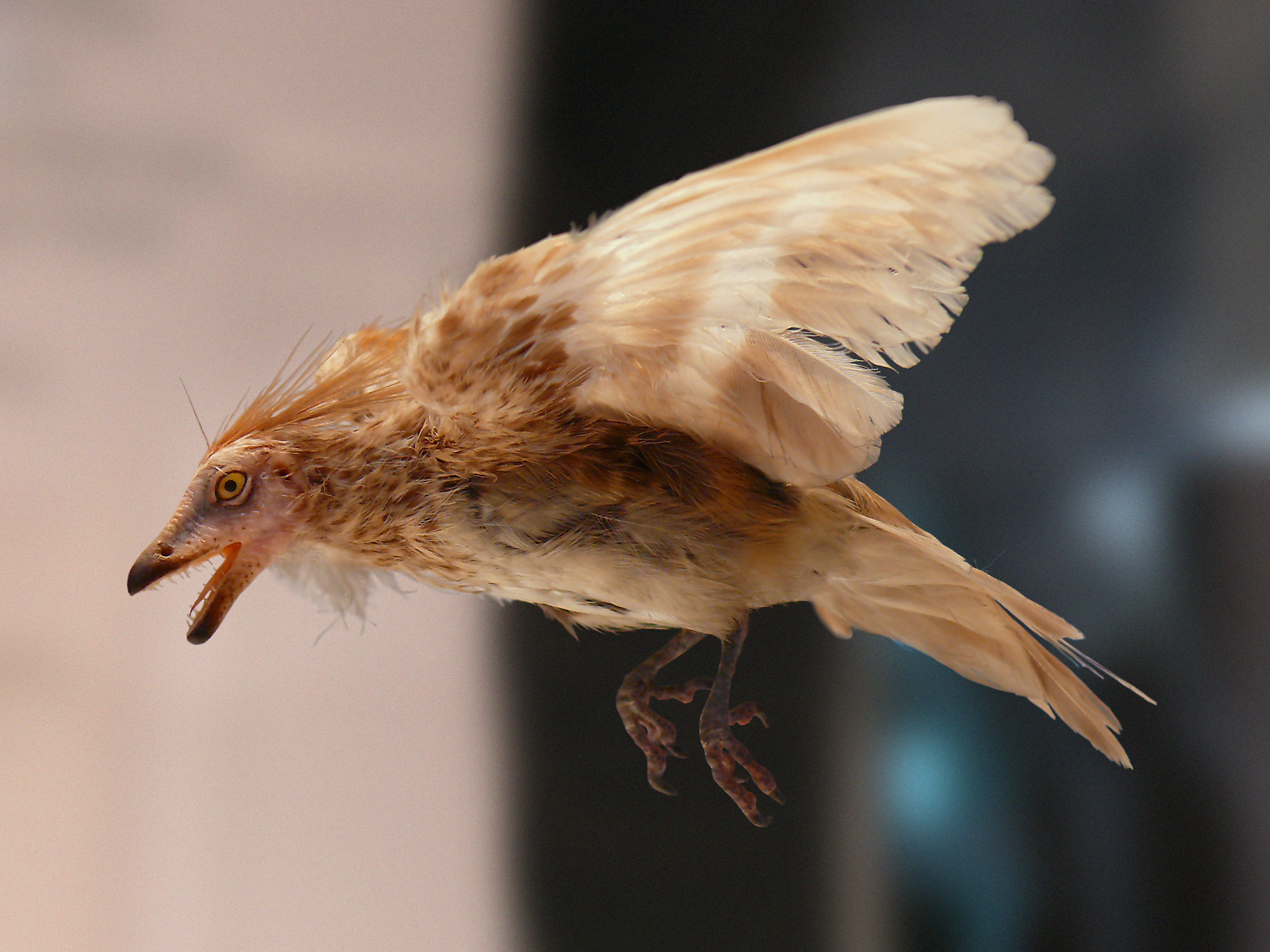
Section of Natural History
Iberomesornis model

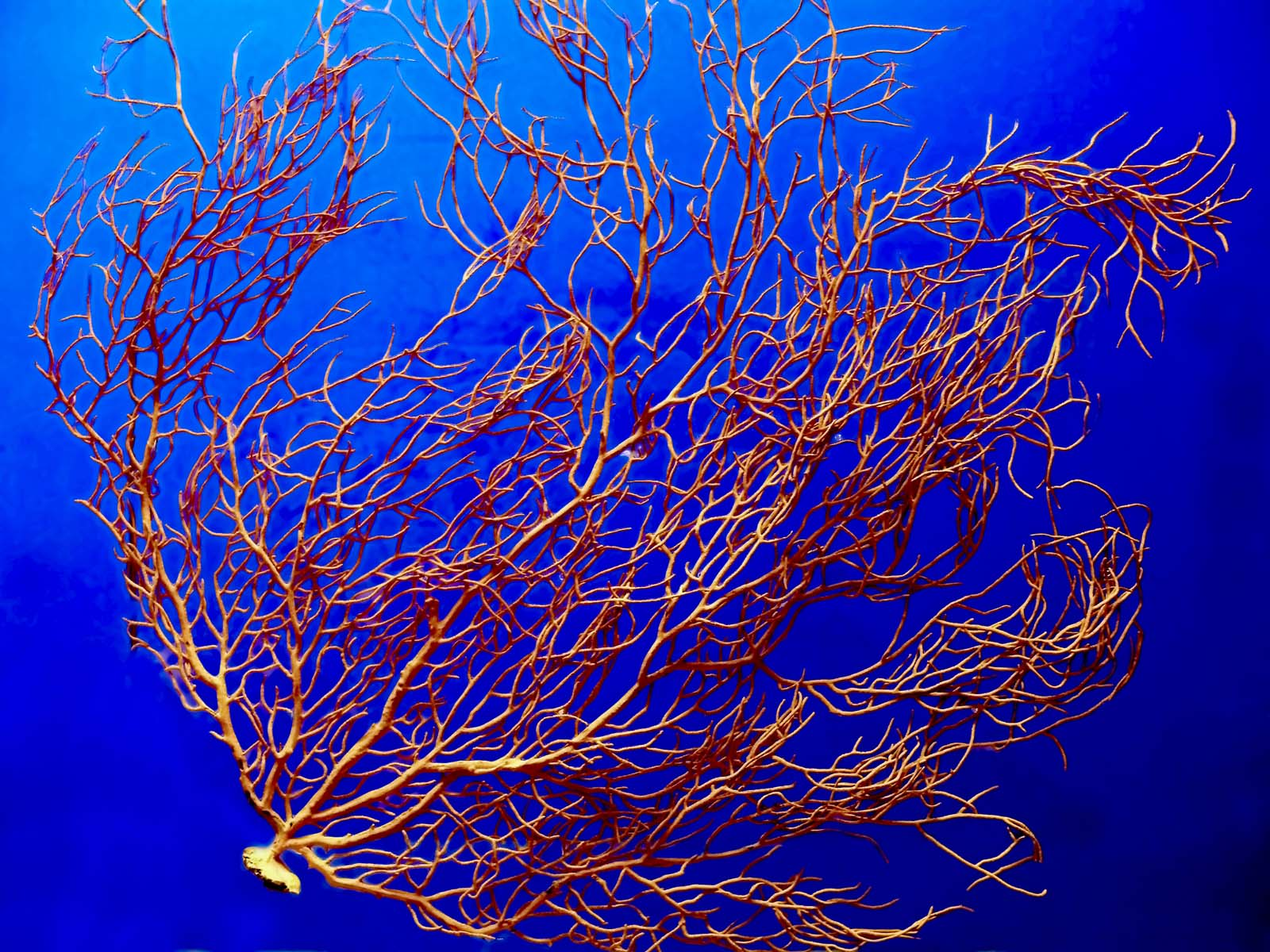
Mediterranean section
Gorgonian

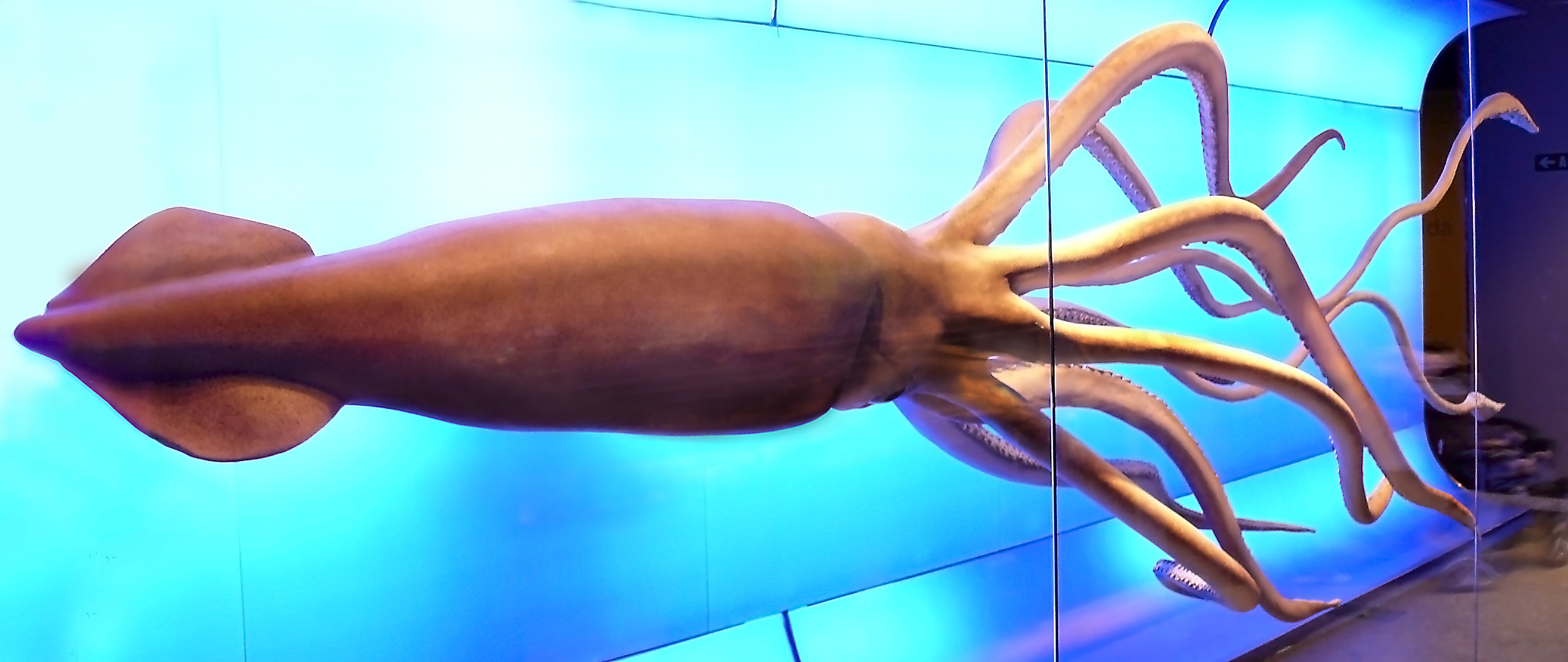
Mediterranean section
Giant squid model

== Research ==
The research departments of the museum are:

- Biodiversity and Evolutionary Biology
- Evolutionary Ecology
- Paleobiology
- Vulcanology
- Geology
