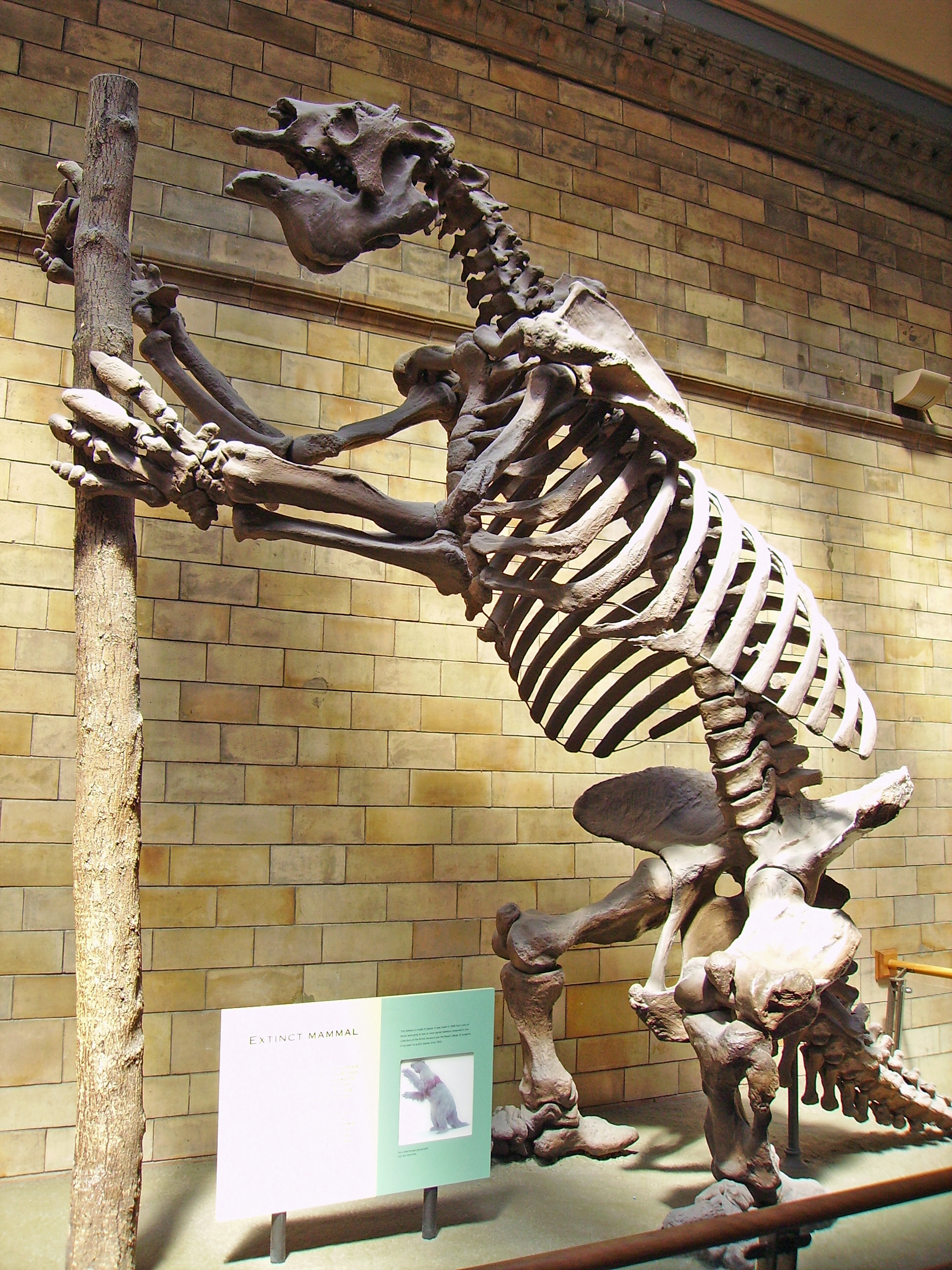
- M. americanum composite skeleton cast, Natural History Museum, London

Scientific classification
- Kingdom: Animalia
- Phylum: Chordata
- Class: Mammalia
- Order: Pilosa
- Suborder: Folivora
- Family: †Megatheriidae
- Subfamily: †Megatheriinae
- Genus: †Megatherium; Cuvier, 1796

Type species
- †Megatherium americanum Cuvier, 1796

Subgenera
- Megatherium: †M. altiplanicum Saint-Andre & De Iuliis, 2001; †M. americanum Cuvier, 1796; †M. gallardoi Ameghino & Kraglievich, 1921; Pseudomegatherium: †M. celendinense Pujos, 2006; †M. medinae Philippi, 1893; †M. sundti Philippi, 1893; †M. tarijense Gervais & Ameghino, 1880; †M. urbiani Pujos & Salas, 2004
- Map showing the distribution of all Megatherium species in red, inferred from fossil finds

Synonyms
- Essonodontherium Ameghino 1884; Orocanthus Ameghino 1885; Neoracanthus Ameghino 1889

= Megatherium =

Megatherium Temporal range: Pliocene-Late Pleistocene ~3.6–0.012 Ma

Genus of extinct ground sloth

Megatherium (/mɛɡəˈθɪəriəm/ meg-ə-THEER-ee-əm; from Greek méga (μέγα) 'great' + theríon (θηρίον) 'beast') is an extinct genus of large ground sloths endemic to South America that lived from the Pliocene through the end of the Late Pleistocene. It is best known for the elephant-sized, 3.5–4 tonnes (7,700–8,800 lb) type species Megatherium americanum, which is primarily known from the Pampas, but which ranged southwards to northernmost Patagonia and northwards to southern Bolivia during the late Middle Pleistocene and Late Pleistocene. Various other species have been described, including those belonging to the Andean subgenus Pseudomegatherium, which range in size from comparable to M. americanum down to approximately 1 tonne (2,200 lb).

The first (holotype) specimen of Megatherium americanum was discovered in 1787 on the bank of the Luján River in what is now northern Argentina. The specimen was shipped to Spain the following year, where it caught the attention of the French paleontologist Georges Cuvier. He named the animal in 1796, making it one of the first prehistoric animals to be scientifically named. Using comparative anatomy, he determined that Megatherium was a giant sloth.

Megatherium is part of the sloth family Megatheriidae, which also includes the closely related and similarly-sized Eremotherium, which was native to tropical South America, Central America and North America as far north as the southern United States.

Megatherium americanum is thought to have been a browser that fed on the foliage and twigs of trees and shrubs using a black rhinoceros–like prehensile upper lip (rather than a prehensile tongue as is often historically depicted). Despite its large body size, Megatherium americanum is widely thought to have been able to rear up on its hind legs while standing and braced, which allowed it to grasp and feed on high-growing leaves, and possibly to use its claws for defense.

Megatherium became extinct around 12,000 years ago as part of the end-Pleistocene extinction event, simultaneously with the majority of other large mammals in the Americas. The extinctions followed the first arrival of humans in the Americas. There is evidence of at least one site where M. americanum was slaughtered and butchered by humans, suggesting that hunting could have been a factor in its extinction.

== Research history ==
Holotype specimen of Megatherium americanum

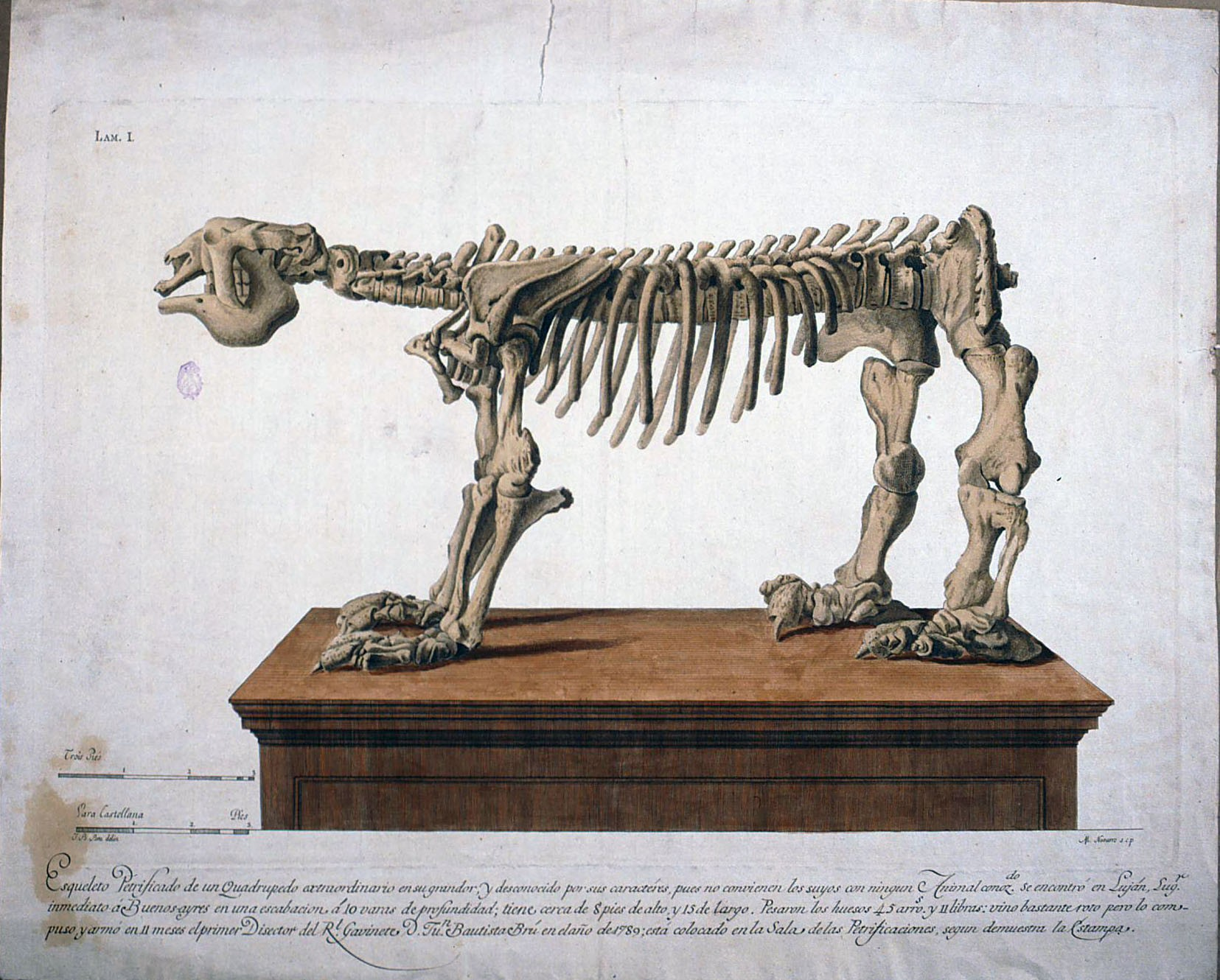
1796 illustration of the holotype specimen of Megatherium americanum by Manuel Navarro

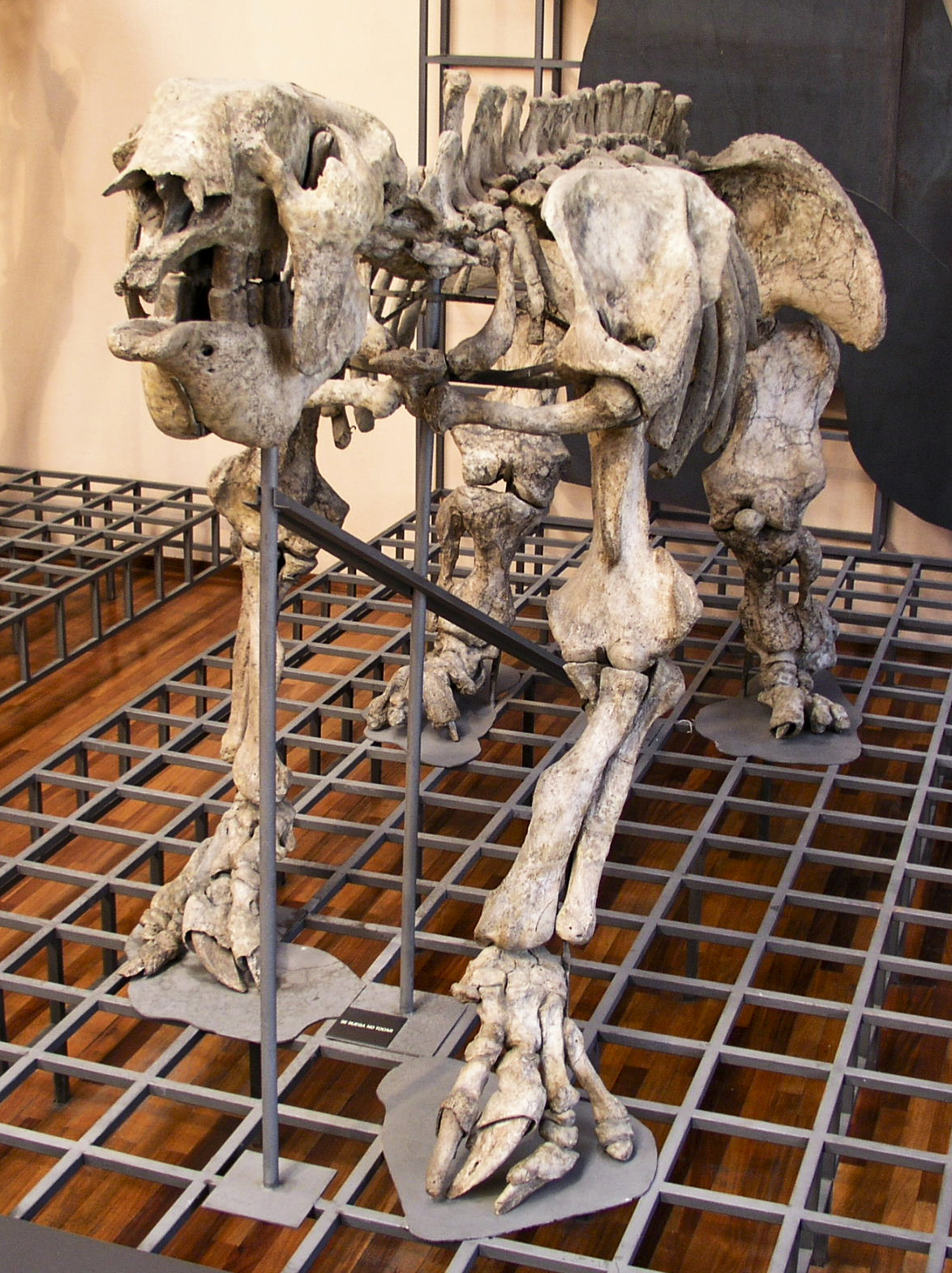
Photo of the specimen as it exists today in the National Museum of Natural Sciences, Madrid

The earliest specimen of Megatherium americanum was discovered in 1787 by Manuel de Torres, a Dominican friar and naturalist, from a ravine on the banks of the Lujan River in what is now northern Argentina, which at the time was part of the Viceroyalty of the Río de la Plata in the Spanish Empire. Torres described the bones as a 'wonder and providence of the Lord'. On the orders of the then viceroy of la Plata, Nicolás Cristóbal del Campo, Marqués de Loreto, the specimen was moved to the capital Buenos Aires. There the skeleton was drawn for the first time by José Custodio Sáa y Faria in a horse-like posture. Campo summoned a number of local indigenous leaders to ask if they had heard of the animal. The skeleton was then transferred by Campo to the Royal Cabinet of Natural History of Madrid (now the National Museum of Natural Sciences MNCN) in 7 crates, which had arrived and been unpacked by late 1788. At the direction of the cabinets main taxidermist Juan Bautista Bru, the specimen was then mounted for public exhibition (The specimen is still on display in the National Museum of Natural Sciences today, with the mount still unaltered from Bru's original effort). In 1796 a scientific description of the skeleton was published authored by Bru along with engineer Joseph Garriga, with engravings by Manuel Navarro. As the work was going through the process of publication in 1795, preliminary prints of the paper were obtained by French diplomat Philippe-Rose Roume who was in Madrid at the time, who sent them to the National Museum of Natural History (Muséum national d'histoire naturelle) in Paris, France, where they were seen by French anatomist and paleontologist Georges Cuvier.

Drawings of Megatherium by Jean Louis Denis Coutant from the 1825 edition of Cuvier's book Recherches sur les ossemens fossiles de quadrupèdes

Cuvier, working solely from the prints from Madrid and not visiting the specimen personally, and using comparative anatomy with "edentate" mammals (now recognised as members of the order Xenarthra) in the collection of the Paris museum, correctly recognised that the remains represented those of a giant sloth, and an animal that was entirely extinct and not living. In early 1796, somewhat before the full publication of the work by Bru, Garriga and Navarro, Cuvier published a paper naming the species Megatherium americanum (literally "Great American beast"), becoming the first fossil mammal to be identified with both a genus and species name. Which description had priority has been controversial in the past. Cuvier later wrote a fuller description in 1804, which was republished in his famous 1812 book Recherches sur les ossemens fossiles de quadrupèdes. Cuvier identified Megatherium as a sloth primarily on the basis of its skull morphology, the dental formula and the shoulder, while regarding the anatomy of its limbs as more similar to armadillos and anteaters. Cuvier suggested that based on the proportions of its limbs (which are approximately equal to each other), that Megatherium did not jump or run, nor crawl like living sloths, with the presence of a clavicle and well developed crests on the humerus, suggesting to Cuvier that the animal probably used its forelimbs to grasp.

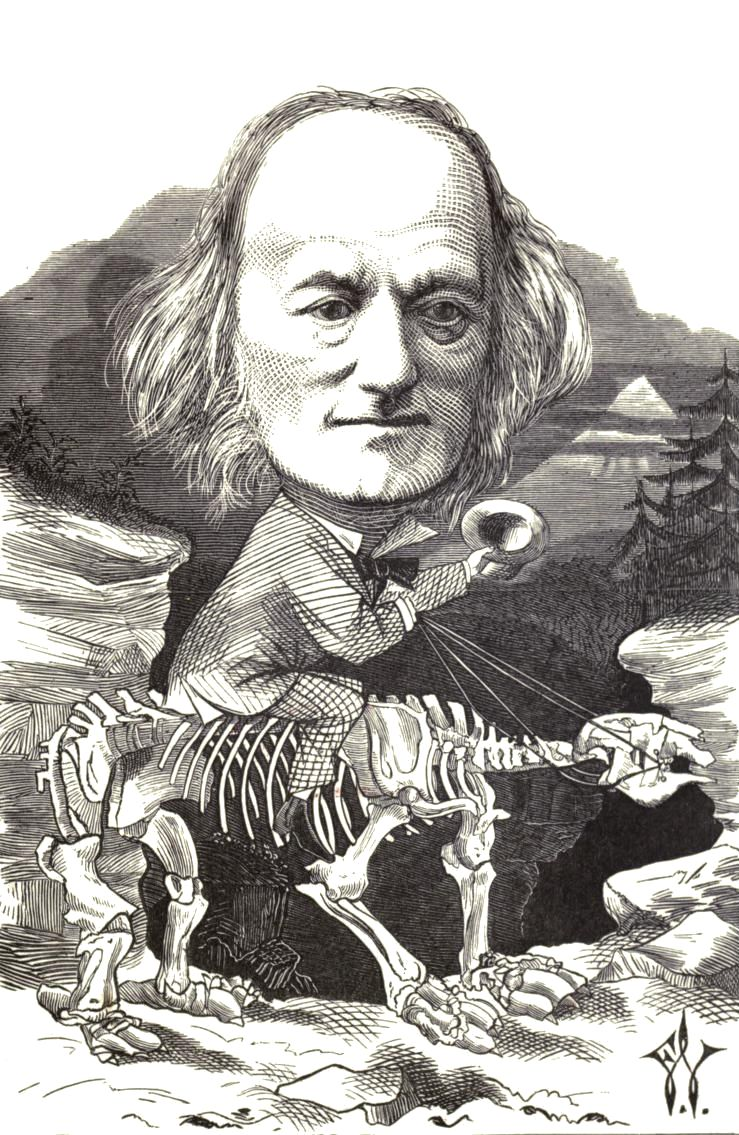
1873 political caricature of Richard Owen riding a Megatherium skeleton

A later publication in 1823 by Cuvier suggested that giant carapaces found in the Pampas also belonged to Megatherium, but British paleontologist Richard Owen in 1839 demonstrated that these actually belonged to another extinct group of xenarthrans called glyptodonts that were related to armadillos. Additional remains of Megatherium were collected by Charles Darwin during the Voyage of the Beagle in the 1830s, these remains were assigned by Richard Owen in 1840 to the species Megatherium cuvieri, which had been named by Anselme Gaëtan Desmarest in 1822. These remains are now assigned to M. americanum. Owen later wrote a monograph series from 1851 to 1860 thoroughly describing the anatomy of M. americanum.

19th century illustration of Megatherium with glyptodonts by Benjamin Waterhouse Hawkins

From the late 19th century onward additional species of Megatherium were described. In 1888 Argentine explorer Francisco Moreno erected the species Megatherium filholi for remains found in the Late Pleistocene of Argentina. In 1880 Paul Gervais and Florentino Ameghino described the species M. tarijense from remains of Pleistocene age found in Bolivia. In 1893 Rodolfo Amando Philippi erected the species M. sundti and M. medinae from remains found in the Pleistocene of Bolivia and Chile, respectively. In 1921, Florentino's brother Carlos Ameghino and Lucas Kraglievich described the species Megatherium gallardoi based on remains found in the Pampas of Northern Argentina, of Early-Middle Pleistocene age. In 2001, the species M. altiplanicum was described based on remains found in the Pliocene of Bolivia. In 2004, the species Megatherium urbinai was erected based on remains found in Pleistocene aged deposits in Peru. In 2006, the species Megatherium celendinense was erected for remains of Pleistocene age found in the Peruvian Andes.

== Taxonomy and evolution ==
Megatherium is divided into 2 subgenera, Megatherium and Pseudomegatherium. Taxonomy according to Pujos (2006) and De Iuliis et al (2009):

- Subgenus Megatherium
  - †M. altiplanicum Saint-André & de Iuliis 2001
  - †M. americanum Cuvier 1796
  - †M. gallardoi Ameghino & Kraglievich, 1921
- Subgenus Pseudomegatherium Kraglievich 1931
  - †M. celendinense Pujos 2006
  - †M. medinae Philippi 1893
  - †M. sundti Philippi 1893
  - †M. tarijense Gervais & Ameghino, 1880
  - †M. urbinai Pujos & Salas 2004

Megatherium gallardoi Ameghino & Kraglievich, 1921 from the Pampas dating to the Early to Middle Pleistocene has sometimes been regarded as a synonym of M. americanum. The species Megatherium filholi Moreno, 1888 also from the Pleistocene of the Pampas region, historically regarded to be a junior synonym of M. americanum representing juvenile individuals has been suggested to be valid by some recent authors. Megatherium gaudryi Moreno (1888) from Argentina, of uncertain temporal provenance but possibly Pliocene in age, may also be valid.

Mitochondrial DNA sequences obtained from M. americanum indicates that three-toed sloths (Bradypus) are their closest living relatives. Phylogeny of sloths after Delsuc et al. 2019.

- Folivora (sloths)
  - †Caribbean sloths
  - - Mylodontoidea
      - Two-toed sloths (Choelopus)
      - †Mylodontidae (Mylodon)
    - Megatherioidea
      - †Megatheriidae (Megatherium)
      - - - †Megalonychidae (Megalonyx)
          - †Nothrotheriidae (Nothrotheriops)
        - Three-toed sloths (Bradypus)

- Megatheriinae
  - Plesiomegatherium
  - Megathericulus
  - - - Megatheriops
      - Pyramiodontherium bergi
      - Pyramiodontherium brevirostrum
    - - Eremotherium
      - Megatherium
        - Megatherium (Megatherium)
          - Megatherium americanum
          - Megatherium altiplanicum
        - Megatherium (Pseudomegatherium)
          - Megatherium sundti
          - - Megatherium urbinai
            - - Megatherium celendinense
              - - Megatherium medinae
                - Megatherium tarijense

Megatheriidae is suggested to have diverged from other sloth families during the Oligocene, around 30 million years ago. The subfamily to which Megatherium belongs, Megatheriinae, first appeared in the Middle Miocene in Patagonia, at least 12 million years ago, represented by the genus Megathericulus. The earliest known remains of the genus Megatherium are known from the Pliocene, found in Bolivia (M. altiplanicum) and the Pampas (indeterminate species), dating to at least 3.6 million years ago. M. altiplanicum is suggested to be more closely related to M. americanum than to species of Pseudomegatherium. Phylogeny of Megatheriinae after Pujos, 2006:

Megatherium americanum first appears in the fossil record during the second half of the Middle Pleistocene, from around 400,000 years ago.

== Description ==
Megatherium americanum skeletal mounts

Side-on view of the Natural History Museum London composite cast skeleton, which has been on display at the museum since 1850 (Note: As indicated on a plaque next to the skeleton)

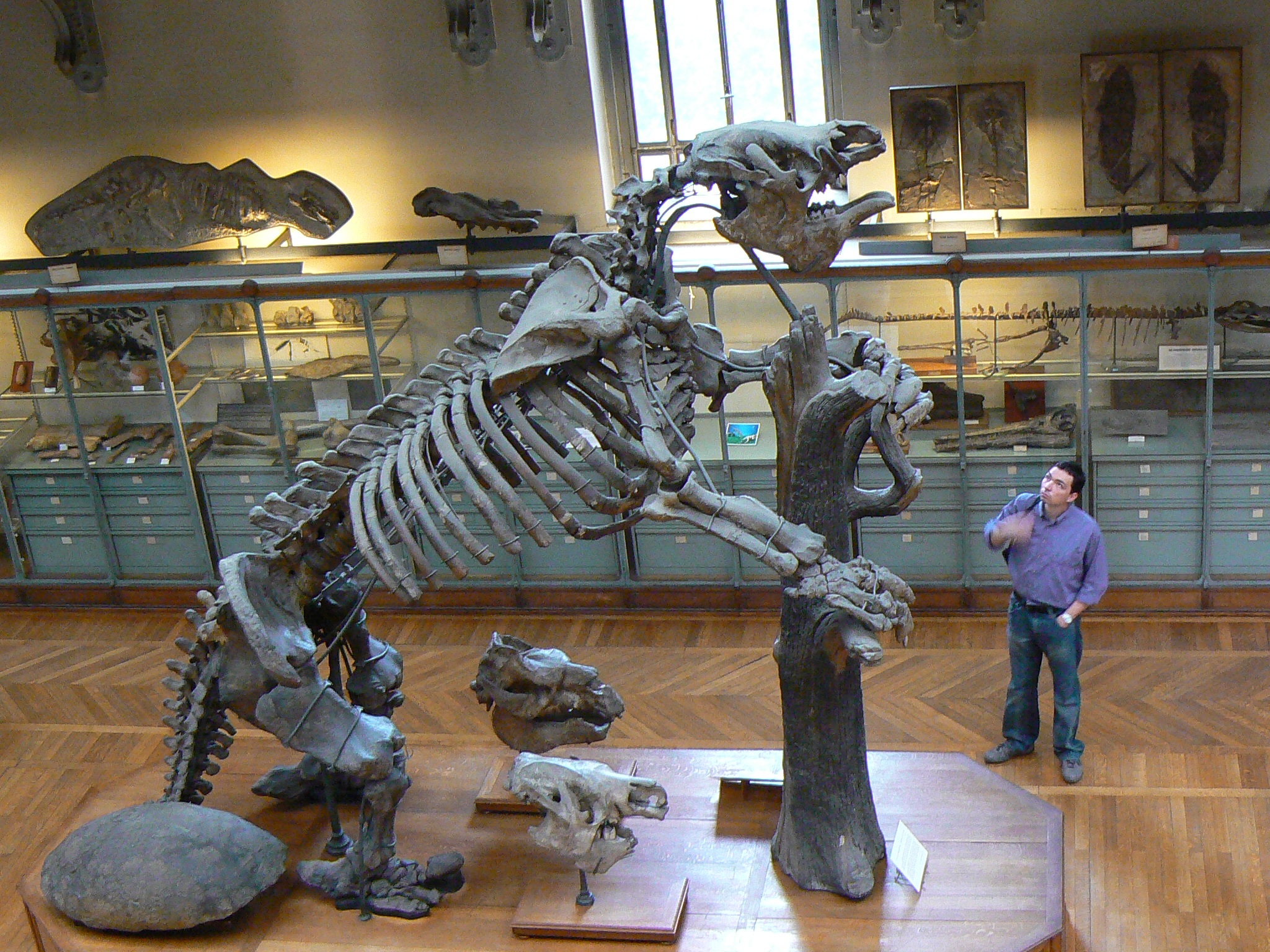
Skeleton of (MNHN-F-1871-383) on display at the Muséum national d'histoire naturelle, Paris, France, collected in 1871

Skeleton at the Museo de Ciencias Naturales de Valencia, part of the Rodger Botet collection brought to the museum in 1898

=== Size ===
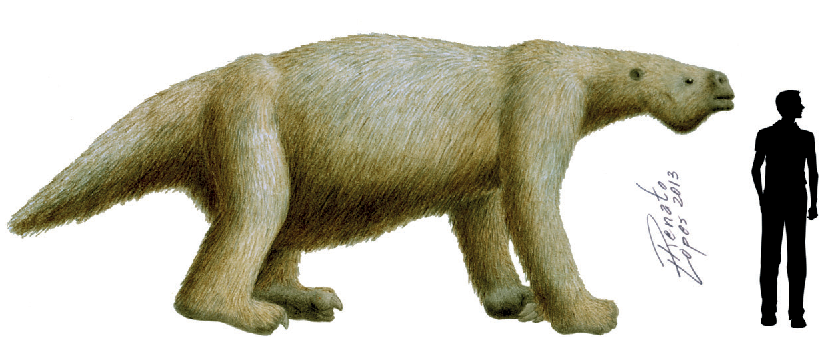
Size of Megatherium americanum compared to a human

M. americanum is one of the largest known ground sloths, with a total body length of around 6 metres (20 ft). Volumetric analysis suggests that a full grown M. americanum weighed around 3,700–4,000 kilograms (8,200–8,800 lb), comparable to an Asian elephant. The Late Pleistocene Andean-Altiplano Pseudomegatherium species Megatherium celendinense was likely comparable in size. These species were only rivalled in size amongst ground sloths by the closely related Eremotherium and the distantly related Lestodon. The Chilean Pseudomegatherium species M. sundti was much smaller, with an estimated body mass of only 1,253 kilograms (2,762 lb), with the Peruvian Megatherium urbinai, Bolivian Megatherium tarijense and the Chilean Megatherium medinae (all also belonging to Pseudomegatherium) also having a considerably smaller body size than M. americanum. The Pliocene Megatherium (Megatherium) species M. altiplanicum has been estimated to weigh 977–1,465 kilograms (2,154–3,230 lb).

=== Skull and jaws ===
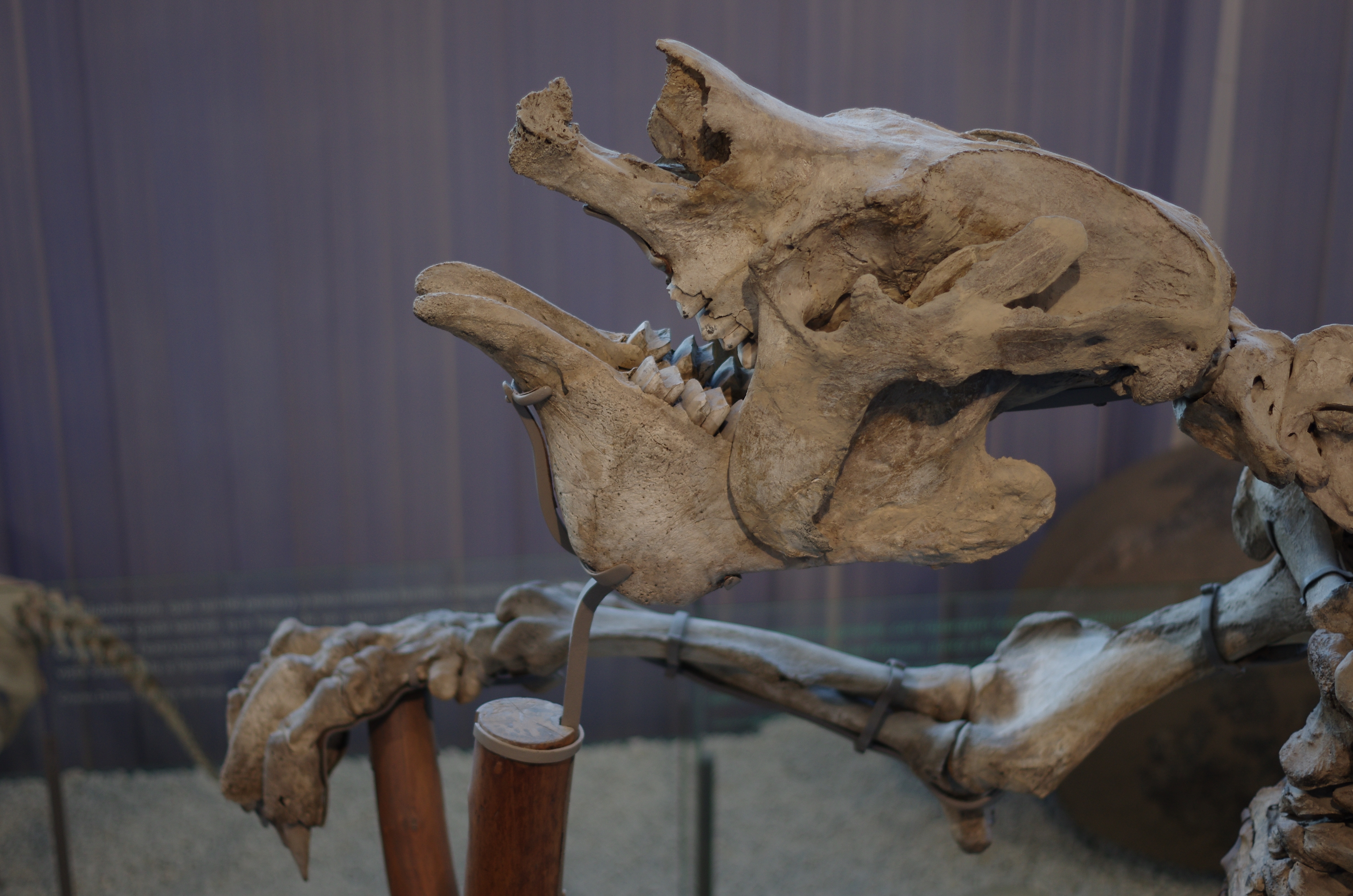
Closeup of the skull and jaws of M. americanum from the Museo de Ciencias Naturales de Valencia mount

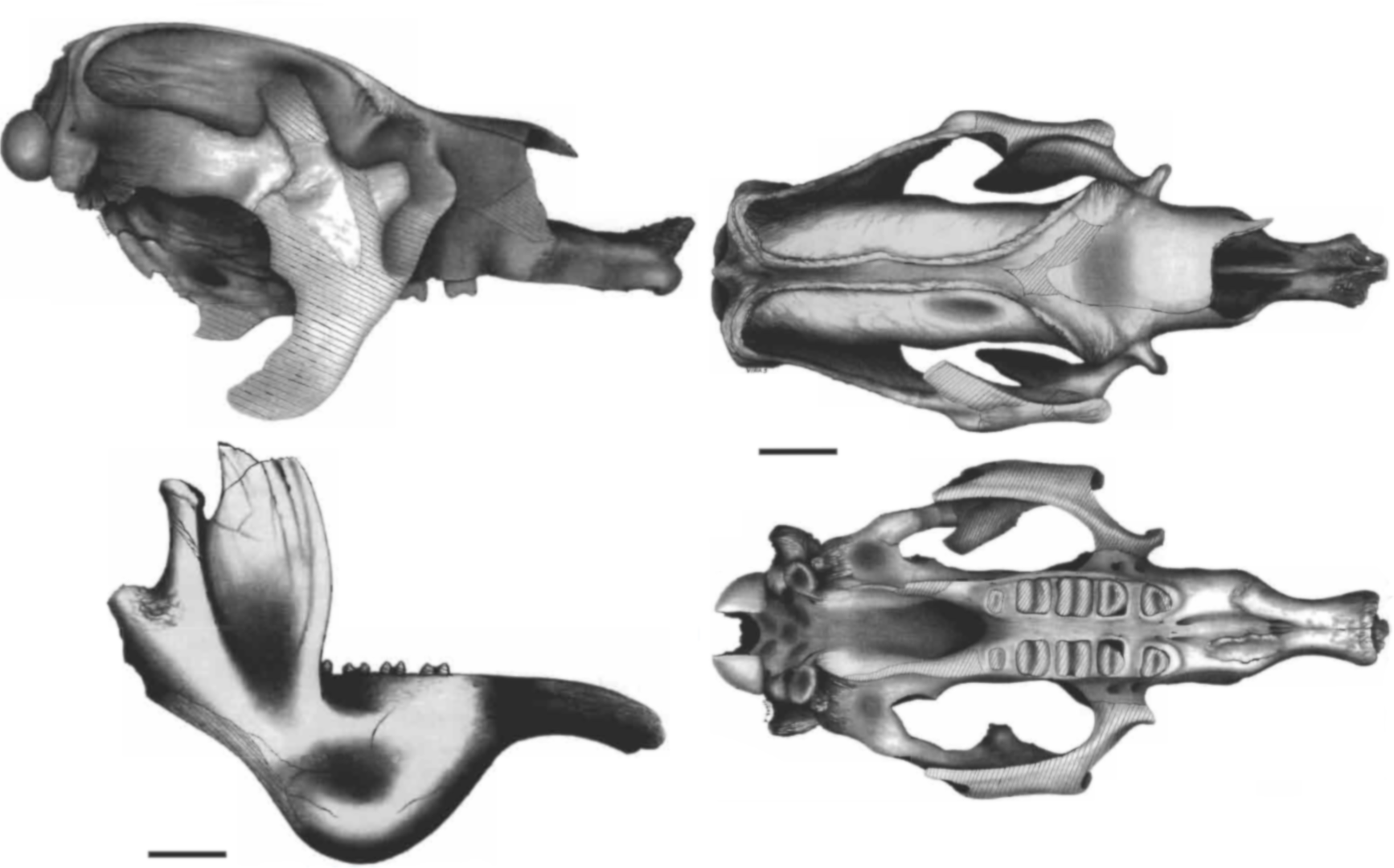
Skull and lower jaws of M. americanum (note: nasal septum is broken) Scale bar = 10 cm, ~ 4 inches

External 3D model
- 3D model of the skull of M. americanum

The head of Megatherium is relatively small compared to body size. The skull is roughly cylindrical in shape, with the cranial region of the skull being narrow. The jugal bone (forming the zygomatic bar) of M. americanum has strongly developed ascending and descending processes (growths/extensions). The skull of M. americanum has a relatively small cranial cavity (and thus brain) relative to skull size, with the skull having extensive sinus spaces. In many species of Megatherium, the lower jaw is relatively deep, which served to accommodate the very long hypselodont (evergrowing) teeth, which are considerably proportionally longer than those of other ground sloths. Like other ground sloths, the number of teeth in the jaw is reduced to 5 and 4 teeth in each half of the upper and lower jaws, respectively, and the teeth lack enamel. The teeth of Megatherium americanum have sharp crests separated by v-shaped valleys, which interlock with the teeth on the opposing jaw. These teeth were rectangular in shape when viewed from above, and self-sharpening, akin to rodent incisors. The skull of M. americanum has a relatively narrow snout/muzzle with a ossified nasal septum, and is suggested to have had a thick prehensile upper lip, similar to that of the living black rhinoceros, which compensated for the lack of teeth at the front of the jaws. The morphology of the hyoid bones in Megatherium suggests that they were relatively rigid, this along with the short distance between the hyoid and the mandibular symphysis (the joint connecting the two halves of the lower jaw) suggests that the tongue had limited ability to protrude, and thus Megatherium did not have a long prehensile tongue, contrary to what was often historically suggested. The skull and jaws of M. americanum show adaptation to powerful vertical biting. The front (premolariform) part of the maxilla in Megatherium species is relatively shorter than in other megatheriines. The premaxilla shape is variable, from Y to X to V-shaped, depending on species and growth stage. M. americanum and M. altiplanicum are distinguished from species of the subgenus Pseudomegatherium by the fusion of the maxilla and premaxilla, while members of Pseudomegatherium are distinguished from those species by their flat occipital condyles (the part of the skull that articulates with the neck).

=== Axial skeleton and limbs ===
Historic lithographs of the skeleton of Megatherium americanum

Skeleton in side-on view

Skeleton in oblique front-on view

External 3D model
- 3D model of the skeleton of M. americanum

Like other megatheriine species, the spinal column is made up of 7 cervical (neck), 16 thoracic, 3 lumbar, 5 sacral (hip) and 17-18 caudal (tail) vertebrae. Unlike in the related Eremotherium, the three points of articulation between the atlas (the first neck vertebra) and the axis (the second neck vertebra) are not fused together. Like other xenarthrans, the posterior vertebrae of Megatherium americanum have additional xenarthrous processes that articulate with the other vertebrae. The ischium was connected to the caudal vertebrae. The caudal vertebrae were combined into a synsacrum. The pubic symphysis is reduced. The tail is large in size.

Historic lithograph of the hand of Megatherium americanum. Rightmost clawed digit is digit II, while the unclawed digit on furthest left is digit V

The bones of the forelimbs of M. americanum are relatively slender. The hand of Megatherium only had four functional digits, with first digit being non functional (having been reduced to a single small metacarpal–carpal complex bone in M. americanum), differing from Eremotherium eomigrans which had a full five functional digits, and the later Eremotherium laurillardi, which only had three functional digits. In the third digit of the hands, the first and second phalanges were fused. The three fingers in the middle of the hand (digits II-IV) bore claws, while the cuneiform hand bones did not touch the ulna. The deltopectoral crest on the upper part of the humerus is weakly developed compared to a number of other megatheriines like Eremotherium and Megatheriops. The olecranon process of the ulna was relatively short. Like other xenarthrans, but unlike most other mammals, Megatherium possesses clavicles (collarbones), which serves to support the forelimb. Like other sloths, the clavicle is merged with the acromion of the scapula.

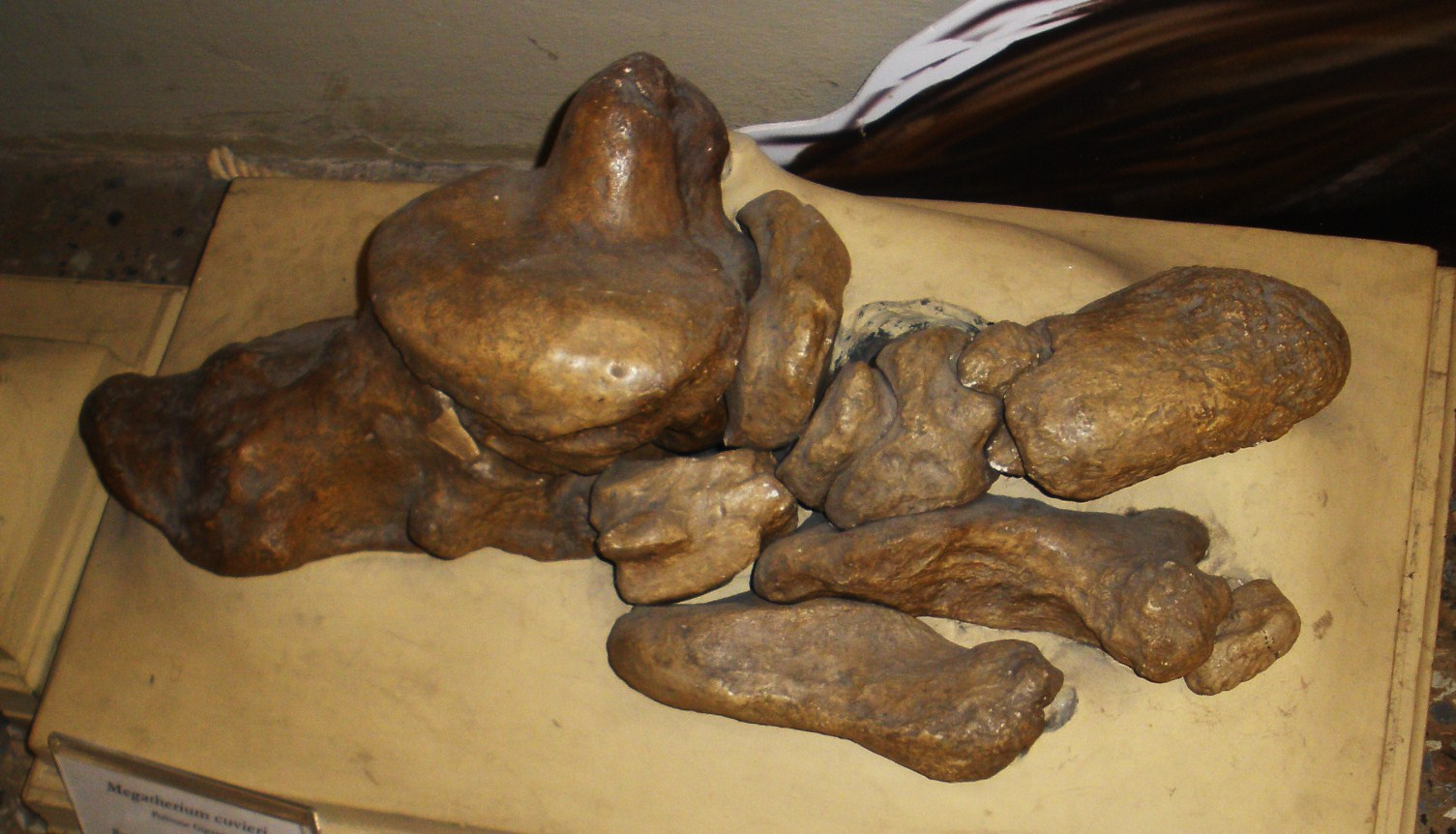
Foot of Megatherium showing enlarged and elongate calcaneum (left) and lateral digits

The femur was massive and roughly rectangular in shape. As in most megatheriines, the tibia and fibula of Megatherium species are fused together at their proximal (closest to hip) end, while in M. americanum and M. tarijense, they are also fused together at their distal (closest to foot) ends. The foot was heavily modified from those of other mammals and earlier ground sloths, with a reduction in the number of digits on the inner part of the foot (digits I and II being lost), the increase in the size and robustness (thickness) of the metapodial elements of the outer digits, with the loss or reduction of the phalangeal bones. The calcaneum is wide and elongate posteriorly. The foot is suggested to have been inwardly rotated, historically the foot was suggested to be near vertical, though a recent study suggests that the angle was much shallower. The weight was primarily borne on the outer digits and the calcaneum. M. urbinai differs from M. americanum and other Megatherium species in the shape and position of the feet and hand bones, including the metacarpals, metatarsals, ectocuneiform, hamate/unciform, navicular and astragalus/talus.

== Ecology ==
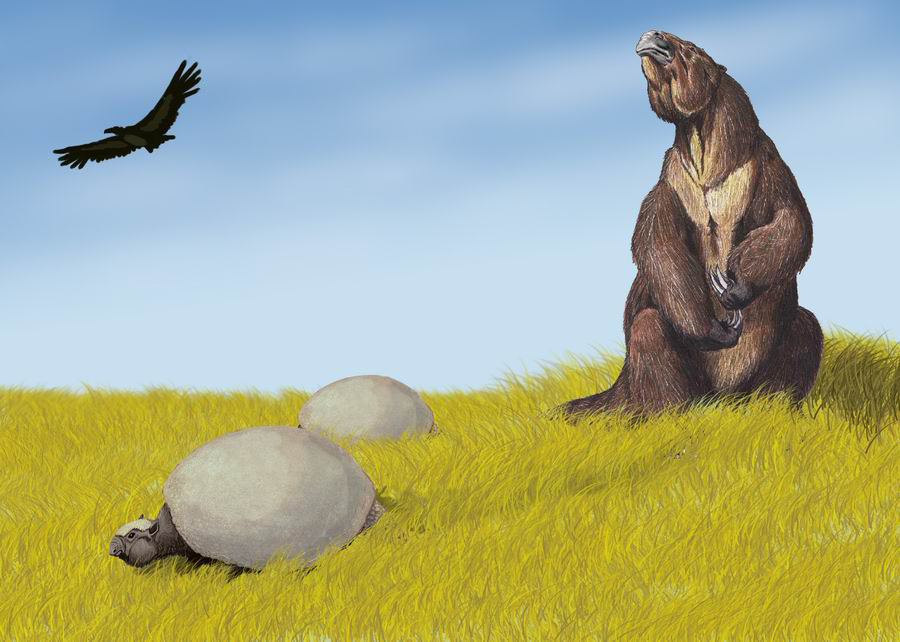
Upright Megatherium americanum in an open landscape alongside two individuals of the glyptodont Glyptodon.

Remains of Megatherium americanum have been found in low elevation areas to the east of the Andes mountains in northern Patagonia, the Pampas and adjacent areas in what is now northern Argentina, Uruguay, Paraguay, southern Bolivia and Rio Grande do Sul in southern Brazil. Megatherium americanum inhabited temperate, arid-to semi arid open habitats. During the Last Glacial Period, the Pampas was generally drier than it is at present with many areas exhibiting a steppe-like environment dominated by grass, with some areas of woodland.

Although some authors have suggested that Megatherium was an omnivore, isotopic analysis has supported an entirely herbivorous diet for Megatherium. Megatherium americanum is suggested to have been a browser that was a selective feeder on the foliage, twigs and fruits of trees and shrubs. The sharp cusps of the teeth served to shear plant material. Megatherium is widely thought to have been able to adopt a bipedal posture to use its forelimbs to grasp vegetation, though whether it was capable of moving in this posture is uncertain. Analysis of injuries on the clavicles of M. americanum individuals suggests that the species probably habitually moved in a quadrupedal posture and assumed a bipedal posture next to trees to feed on high-growing leaves, likely using its forelimbs to brace itself against the tree trunk, as well as to pull down higher branches within reach of its prehensile lip. Isotopic analysis suggests that some individuals of M. americanum at certain times and places also consumed grass. The smaller Megatherium tarijense has been suggested to have had a mixed feeding-browsing diet. Preserved coprolites attributed to Megatherium suggests that its diet included plants like Fabiana, Ephedra (Ephedra breana), beebrush, Junellia, and Chuquiraga.

Whether or not Megatherium had a slow metabolism like living tree sloths is uncertain. Analysis of the nutrient foramina in the diaphysis (shaft) of the femur of Megatherium americanum shows that they are more similar to those of other large living mammals like elephants than living tree sloths, which may suggest that it had a metabolism more similar to non-xenarthran mammals and was capable of vigorous activity similar to living elephants. However, isotopic analysis of teeth has been argued to suggest that Megatherium had a somewhat lower body temperature than non-xenarthran mammals, around 30–32 °C (86–90 °F), comparable to that of living tree sloths, implying a lower metabolic rate. Megatherium americanum has been traditionally reconstructed as being covered with a thick coat of fur. Due to its very large body size, some authors have alternatively argued that Megatherium americanum was probably relatively hairless like modern elephants in order to maintain a stable body temperature, due to a large body having proportionally less surface area from which to radiate heat. However this has been disputed, with other authors suggesting based on thermodynamic modelling assuming a living xenarthran-like metabolism that Megatherium species probably had a dense coat of fur around 3 centimetres (1.2 in) thick to be able to tolerate the relatively cool environments they inhabited.

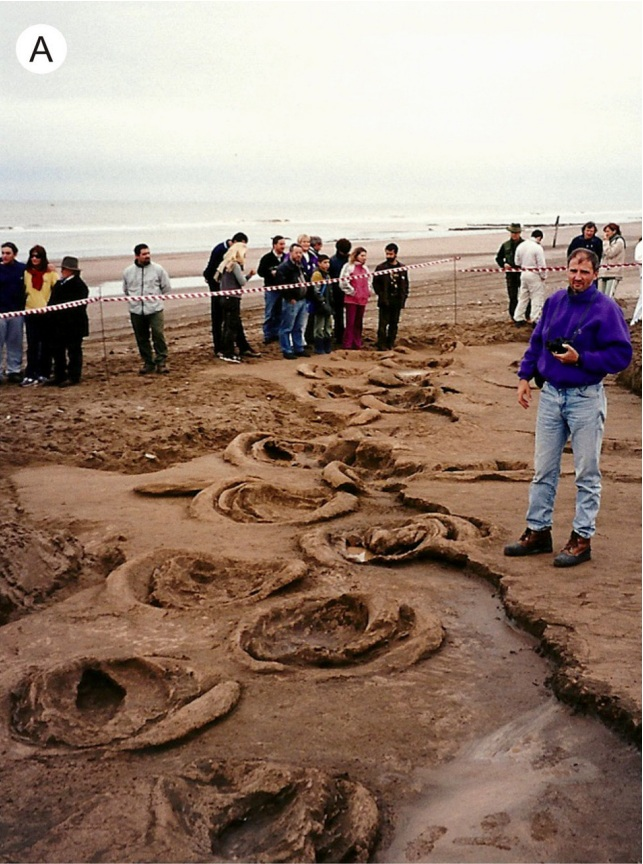
Trackway thought likely to have been produced by Megatherium from Buenos Aires Province, Argentina

Based on fossil trackways and the anatomy of its inner ear, which is considerably different from living sloths and more similar to those of armadillos, species of Megatherium, while probably not capable of speedy locomotion due to limitations of their skeletal anatomy, were likely significantly more agile and mobile than living sloths, which are only capable of moving 0.5–0.6 kilometres per hour (0.31–0.37 mph). Calculations based on the stride length of preserved trackways attributed to Megatherium have variously estimated a 3–8 kilometres per hour (1.9–5.0 mph) walking speed for Megatherium, but the validity of estimating specific walking speeds from fossil trackways has been questioned. Species of Megatherium likely relied on their large adult body size to protect themselves against predators. Like many other large mammals, Megatherium is suggested to have had a slow life cycle in accordance with a K-selection strategy. Megatherium americanum is suggested to have given birth to a single large offspring at a time.

The anatomy of its forelimb bones suggests that M. americanum had the ability to rapidly and powerfully extend its arms, which likely made its claws effective stabbing weapons. It may have used its claws like this to defend itself, as living tree sloths do. Although some authors in the 19th century suggested that Megatherium engaged in digging behaviour, this has been disputed by other scholars, and the morphology of its limb bones do not appear to display significant adaptations to digging unlike some other ground sloths like mylodontids.

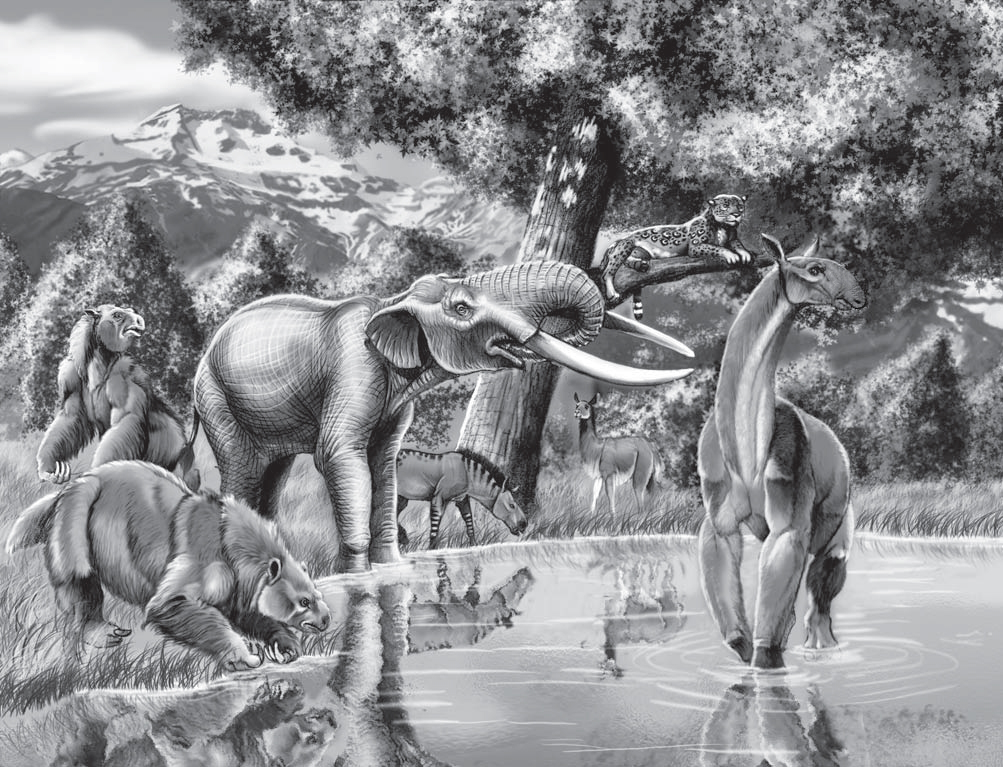
Landscape of Pleistocene mammals found in Chile including Megatherium medinae (upper left), along with fellow ground sloth Glossotherium, the elephant-like gomphothere Notiomastodon, the equine Hippidion, the llama Palaeolama, the long-necked ungulate Macrauchenia and the jaguar

In the Pampas, Megatherium americanum lived alongside other megafauna species, including the large ground sloth Lestodon, along with the smaller (but still large) ground sloths Mylodon, Glossotherium, and Scelidotherium, the glyptodonts (very large armadillos with fused round carapaces covering the body) Glyptodon, Doedicurus, and Panochthus, the large camel-like ungulate Macrauchenia and rhinoceros-like Toxodon, the gomphothere (elephant-relative) Notiomastodon, the equines Hippidion and Equus neogeus, the large short-faced bear Arctotherium, and the large sabertooth cat Smilodon. The range of Megatherium americanum overlaps little with its similarly sized tropical relative Eremotherium, with their co-occurrence only confidently reported from a few localities in Southern Brazil, and it is unclear whether they were contemporary at these localities.

== Relationship with humans and extinction ==
During the Late Pleistocene, six species of Megatherium were present in South America, including M. americanum in the Pampas and adjacent regions, and the 5 species of Pseudomegatherium in the vicinity of the Andes.

The youngest unambiguous dates for Megatherium are from the end of the Late Pleistocene. Supposed early Holocene dates obtained for Megatherium americanum and other Pampas megafauna have been questioned, with suggestions that they are likely due to humic acid contamination of the collagen used to radiocarbon date the bones. Megatherium disappeared simultaneously along with the vast majority (>80%) of other large (megafaunal) South American mammals, as part of the end-Pleistocene extinction event. The causes of the extinctions (which were a global phenomenon effecting all continents other than Africa) are controversial, but have widely been attributed to the effects of human hunting, climate change, or the combination of both. The use of bioclimatic envelope modeling indicates that the area of suitable habitat for Megatherium had shrunk and become fragmented by the mid-Holocene. While this alone would not likely have caused its extinction, it has been cited as a possible contributing factor.

Towards the end of the Late Pleistocene, humans first arrived in the Americas, with some of the earliest evidence of humans in South America being the Monte Verde II site in Chile, dating to around 14,500 years Before Present (~12,500 BC). The extinction interval of Megatherium and other megafauna coincides with the appearance and abundance of stone Fishtail points, which are suggested to have been used to hunt megafauna (likely hafted to spears), across the Pampas region and South America more broadly. At the Paso Otero 5 site in the Pampas of northeast Argentina, Fishtail points are associated with burned bones of Megatherium americanum and other extinct megafauna. The bones appear to have been deliberately burned as a source of fuel. Due to the poor preservation of the bones there is no clear evidence of human modification.

There is evidence for the butchery of Megatherium by humans. Two M. americanum bones, an ulna and an atlas vertebra, from separate collections, bear cut marks suggestive of butchery, with the latter suggested to represent an attempt to exploit the contents of the head. A kill site dating to around 12,600 years Before Present (BP), is known from Campo Laborde in the Pampas in Argentina, where a single individual of M. americanum was slaughtered and butchered at the edge of a swamp, which is the only confirmed giant ground-sloth kill site in the Americas. At the site several stone tools were present, including the fragment of a projectile point. Another possible kill site is Arroyo Seco 2 near Tres Arroyos in the Pampas in Argentina, where M. americanum bones amongst those of other megafauna were found associated with human artifacts dating to approximately 14,782–11,142 cal yr BP. This hunting may have been a factor in its extinction.

== Cultural references ==
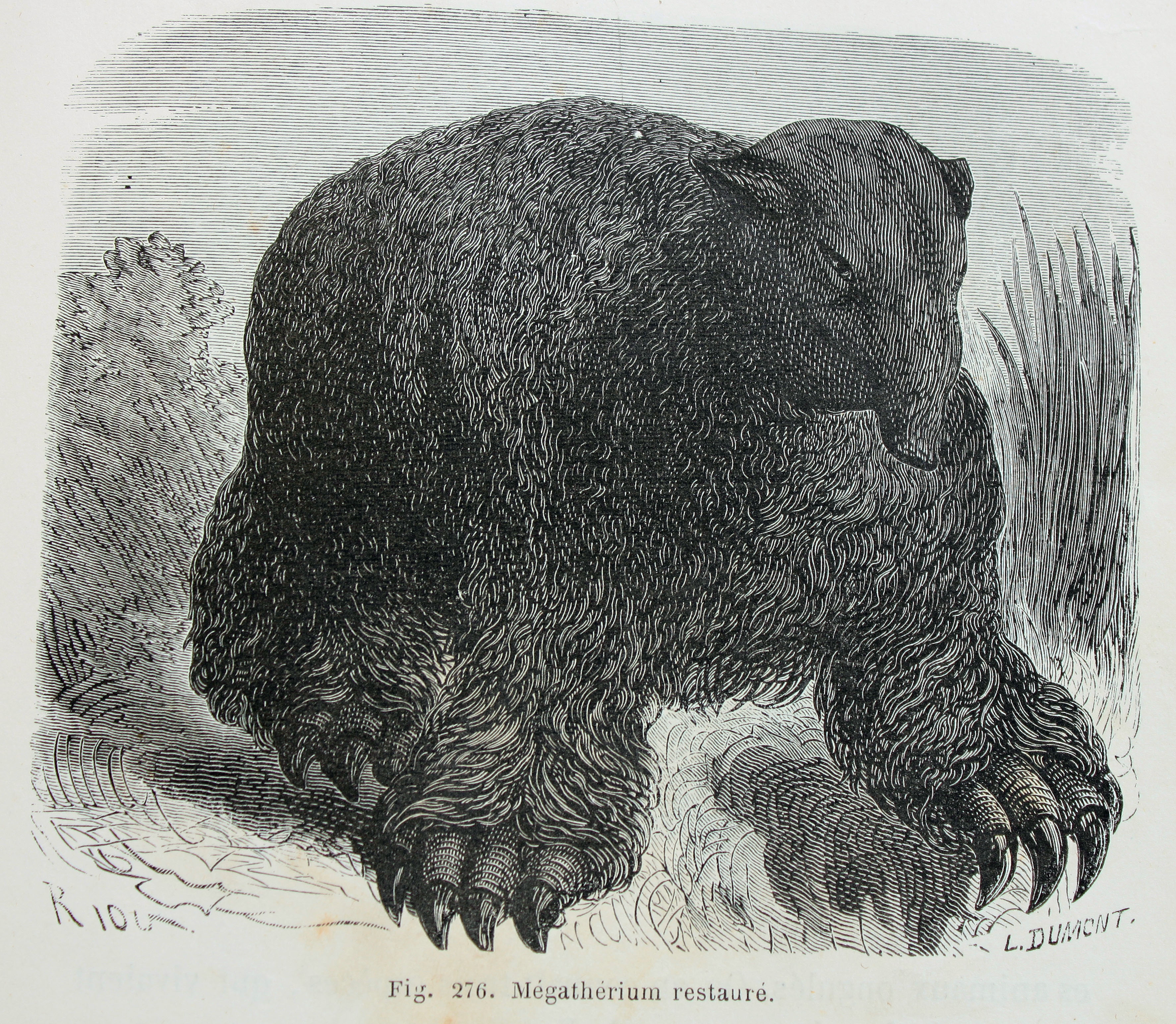
Illustration of Megatherium americanum in La Terre avant le déluge from 1863, depicting it with a short trunk

Megatherium became well known in early 19th century Europe due to specimens of it being prominently placed in museums, resulting it being illustrated in numerous encyclopedias and other works of the era. Johann Wolfgang von Goethe wrote about Megatherium in his 1820s essay Die Faultiere und die Dickhäutigen (The sloths and pachyderms), imagining in a fable narrative Megatherium being the evolutionarily transformed descendant of a large whale-like creature that had come onto land, transformed as a result of the will of its Geist (spirit). During the 19th century in Victorian Britain, Megatherium was widely known and a source of curiosity and amusement for the general public, and referenced or alluded to in numerous literary works, both secular and Christian. These often used it as a personification or synecdoche of laziness (in the words of scholar Richard Fallon, a "byword for ponderous obsolescence") or more broadly sinfulness, often referencing the erroneous idea that living tree sloths were "degenerate" descendants of Megatherium. The Megatherium Club, named for the extinct animal and founded by William Stimpson, was a group of Washington, D.C.–based scientists who were attracted to that city by the Smithsonian Institution's rapidly growing collection, from 1857 to 1866. In the 1864 Jules Verne novel Journey to the Centre of the Earth, bones of Megatherium are encountered by the characters with living Megatherium also appearing in a dream sequence, where it is depicted as engaging in digging, with its appearance likely inspired by Megatherium's inclusion in the 1863 science book La Terre avant le déluge (The World before the Deluge) by Louis Figuier. Megatherium feature in H.G. Wells 1928 novel Mr. Blettsworthy on Rampole Island, serving as monstrous antagonists who impede the progress of other lifeforms in what is later revealed to be a dream sequence, with Megatherium serving as a metaphor for failing liberal political institutions. Megatherium has been depicted in a number of paleontology documentaries, including Walking with Beasts (2001).
