= Tapirus rondoniensis =

Tapirus rondoniensis Temporal range: Pleistocene (Uquian-Ensenadan) ~2–1 Ma

Scientific classification
- Domain: Eukaryota
- Kingdom: Animalia
- Phylum: Chordata
- Class: Mammalia
- Order: Perissodactyla
- Family: Tapiridae
- Genus: Tapirus
- Species: †T. rondoniensis

Binomial name
- †Tapirus rondoniensis Holanda, Ribeiro, & Ferigolo 2011

Extinct species of tapir

Tapirus rondoniensis is an extinct species of large sized tapir that lived in northwestern parts of Brazil during the Pleistocene. Fossils of the species were found in the Río Madeira Formation of Rondônia, after which the species is named.

== Characteristics ==
This species was originally described by Elizete Celestino Holanda, Ana Maria Ribeiro, and Jorge Ferigolo, in 2011, using materials from the Upper Pleistocene of the Madeira River Formation, in Araras, Nova Mamoré municipality, Rondônia state, Brazil.

The type specimen of Tapirus rondoniensis is an almost complete skull with a unique combination of characteristics that differ from those of current and fossil species of Tapirus described in South America.

It is mainly identified by its broad frontals that support pneumatization that extends to the frontoparietal suture, a high sagittal crest, and a weakly molarized P2. T. rondoniensis is similar in some respects to T. terrestris, but retains some primitive cranial and dental character states like T. pinchaque, such as broad fronts and a weakly molarized P2.

An extensive study of all the materials collected in the fossil deposits of the Tapirus genus concluded that this is a valid species.

On the basis of morphometric analysis of its teeth, it is concluded that T. rondoniensis is significantly smaller than most fossil or living tapirs, such as T. indicus, T. oliverasi, T. tarijensis, and T. haysii; and that it was similar in size to T. terrestris and T. mesopotamicus.

On the basis of cladistic-morphological analysis, it was indicated that T. rondoniensis is the closest species to the living T. kabomani, from which it differs by possessing 3 autapomorphies.
