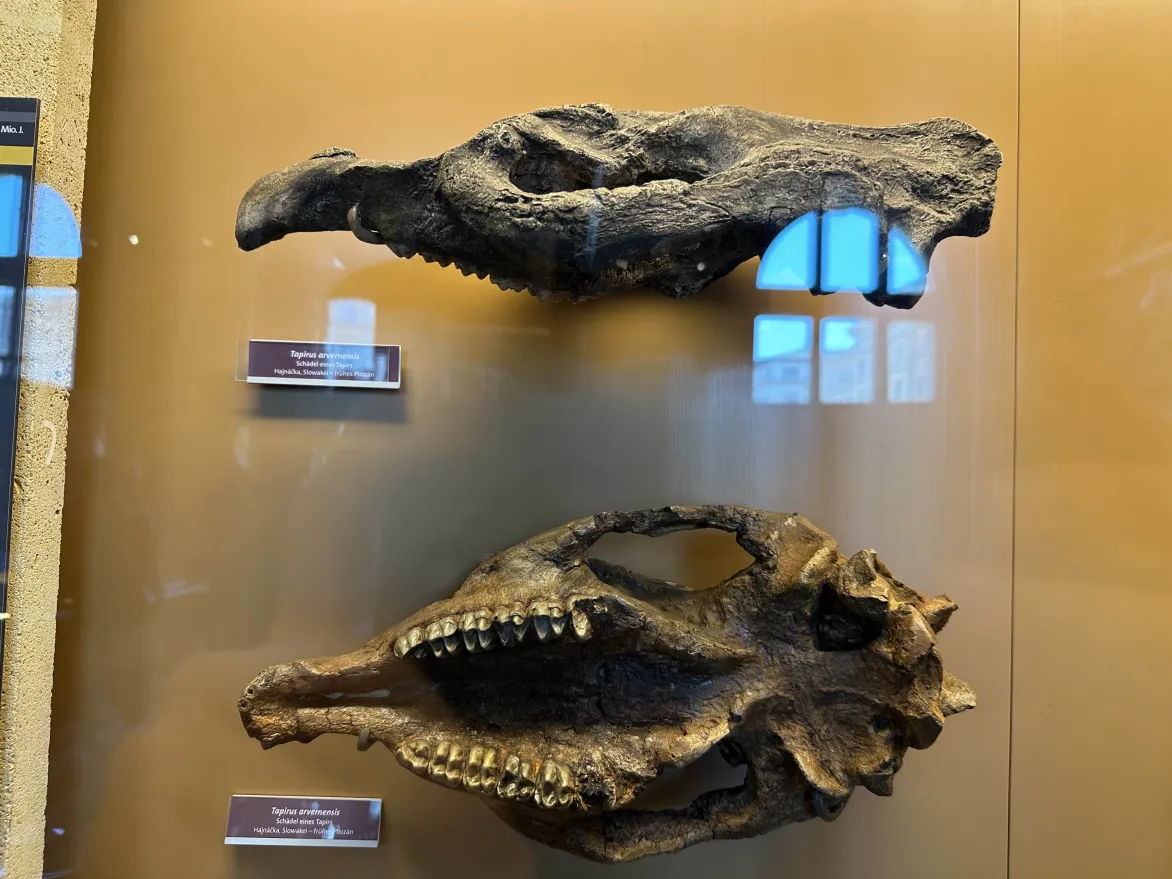
- Partially crushed skull of T. arvernensis
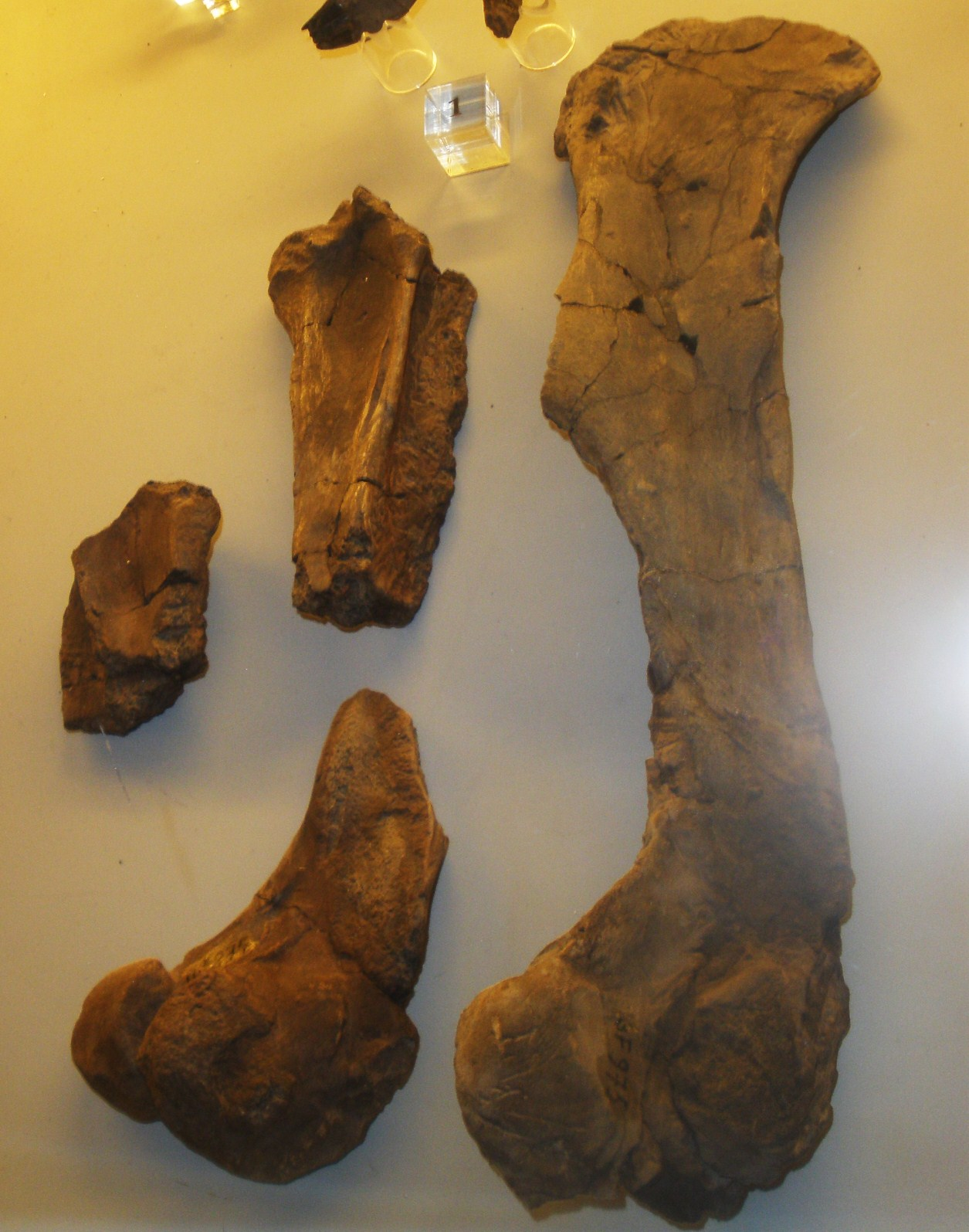
- Limb bones of T. arvernensis

Scientific classification
- Kingdom: Animalia
- Phylum: Chordata
- Class: Mammalia
- Order: Perissodactyla
- Family: Tapiridae
- Genus: Tapirus
- Species: †T. arvernensis

Binomial name
- †Tapirus arvernensis Croizet & Jobert, 1828

= Tapirus arvernensis =

Tapirus arvernensis Temporal range: Late Miocene–Late Pliocene

Extinct species of tapir

Tapirus arvernensis is an extinct species of tapir that lived in Europe from the end of the Late Miocene (MN 13, around 7-5 million years ago) until the Pliocene-Pleistocene boundary (around 2.6 million years ago). It was the last tapir species native to Europe. It is suggested to be closely related to the living Malayan tapir (Tapirus indicus). It is uncertain whether T. arvernensis descends from/is related to earlier Tapirus species present in Europe, such as the Late Miocene Tapirus priscus, or whether it represents a separate migration from Asia. The latter has been argued to be more likely given the apparent absence of tapirs belonging to the genus Tapirus in Europe (though the extinct tapir genus Tapiriscus was present) immediately before the appearance of T. arvernensis.

The species is known from several well preserved specimens, including several largely complete skulls, as well as several nearly complete skeletons, with the best preserved specimens being from the Camp dels Ninots lagerstatte in Spain. It was about the same size as the living mountain tapir (Tapirus pinchaque), reaching 1.8–2 metres (5 ft 11 in – 6 ft 7 in) in length and 75–80 centimetres (2.46–2.62 ft) in shoulder height, with a body mass estimated to have exceeded 200 kilograms (440 lb). It has similar proportions to living tapir species such as the South American tapir (Tapirus terrestris), though in comparison to that species it did not have a pronounced sagittal crest at the top of the skull. Although it has been suggested that the species can be subdivided into two chronosubspecies based on body size, the earlier T. arvernensis minor and the later T. a. arvernensis, this has been disputed, with analysis of teeth dimensions suggesting there is no clear size trend for the species across time.

This species had a wide distribution across Europe being found in Spain, southern England (Red Crag), the Netherlands, France, Italy, Slovakia, Hungary, Greece, Romania, Ukraine and the North Caucasus. It is suggested to have inhabited relatively warm, humid, forested environments. Tooth wear analysis of specimens from Britain suggests a browsing based diet including leaves and twigs.

Other mammal species that lived alongside Tapirus arvernensis in the Pliocene of Europe include the large mastodon "Mammut" borsoni, the elephant-like "tetralophodont gomphothere" Anancus arvernensis, the primitive mammoth Mammuthus rumanus, the large rhinoceros Stephanorhinus jeanvireti, the pig Sus arvernensis, the bovines Alephis and Leptobos, the gazelle Gazella borbonica, the deer Croizetoceros ramosus and Praeelaphus lyra, the monkey Mesopithecus monspessulanus, the three-toed hipparionine equine Hipparion crassum, the lion-sized sabertooth cat Homotherium crenatidens, and the bear Ursus etruscus.
