= Tapirus mesopotamicus =

Tapirus mesopotamicus Temporal range: Pleistocene

Scientific classification
- Kingdom: Animalia
- Phylum: Chordata
- Class: Mammalia
- Order: Perissodactyla
- Family: Tapiridae
- Genus: Tapirus
- Species: †T. mesopotamicus

Binomial name
- †Tapirus mesopotamicus Ferrero & Noriega, 2007

Extinct species of mammal

Tapirus mesopotamicus is an extinct species of tapir that lived in South America during the Pleistocene. It is considered a possible ancestor of all extant South American tapirs.

== Description ==
This species was originally described by B. S. Ferrero and J. I. Noriega in 2007. Their description was based on quite complete cranial pieces exhumed from sediments of the Luján River in the Diamante department, in the province of Entre Ríos, in central-eastern Argentina.

The type specimen is CICYTTP-PV-M-1-23, a skull and proximal fragment of the right jaw. Its type locality is the north bank of the Ensenada stream, on a Pleistocene lake-fluvial horizon in the "Arroyo Feliciano formation" of Argentina.

It is described as having a long and robust skull, with a short rostrum with respect to the total length of the skull. The skull has a single, non-arched sagittal crest, large flat parietal bones on the anterior skull cover, with the temporal crests converging very close to the frontal-parietal suture. The palate is highly arched, the premaxilla is deeply serrated above the canine, and the upper jaw and base of the zygomatic process are surprisingly robust. The P1 is short and quadrangular, and the mandibular condyle is thin, with the posterior wall flat or somewhat concave.

An extensive study of all the Tapirus materials collected in the fossil deposits of South America concluded that this is a valid species.

On the basis of morphometric analysis of its teeth, it is concluded that Tapirus mesopotamicus is significantly smaller than the larger fossil or living tapirs, such as Tapirus indicus, Tapirus oliverasi, Tapirus tarijensis, and Tapirus haysii; and that it was similar in size to Tapirus terrestris and Tapirus rondoniensis.

== Palaeobiology ==
T. mesopotamicus had a high bite force for a tapir, especially when compared to species of tapirs that existed prior to the Pleistocene.

This species, like any member of the Tapirus genus, is associated with warm climates: rainforest, savanna or humid tropical or subtropical forests near rivers; with a herbivorous diet of leaves and fruits.
