= Tapirus priscus =

Tapirus priscus Temporal range: Late Miocene

Scientific classification
- Kingdom: Animalia
- Phylum: Chordata
- Class: Mammalia
- Order: Perissodactyla
- Family: Tapiridae
- Genus: Tapirus
- Species: †T. priscus

Binomial name
- †Tapirus priscus Kaup, 1833

Species of mammal

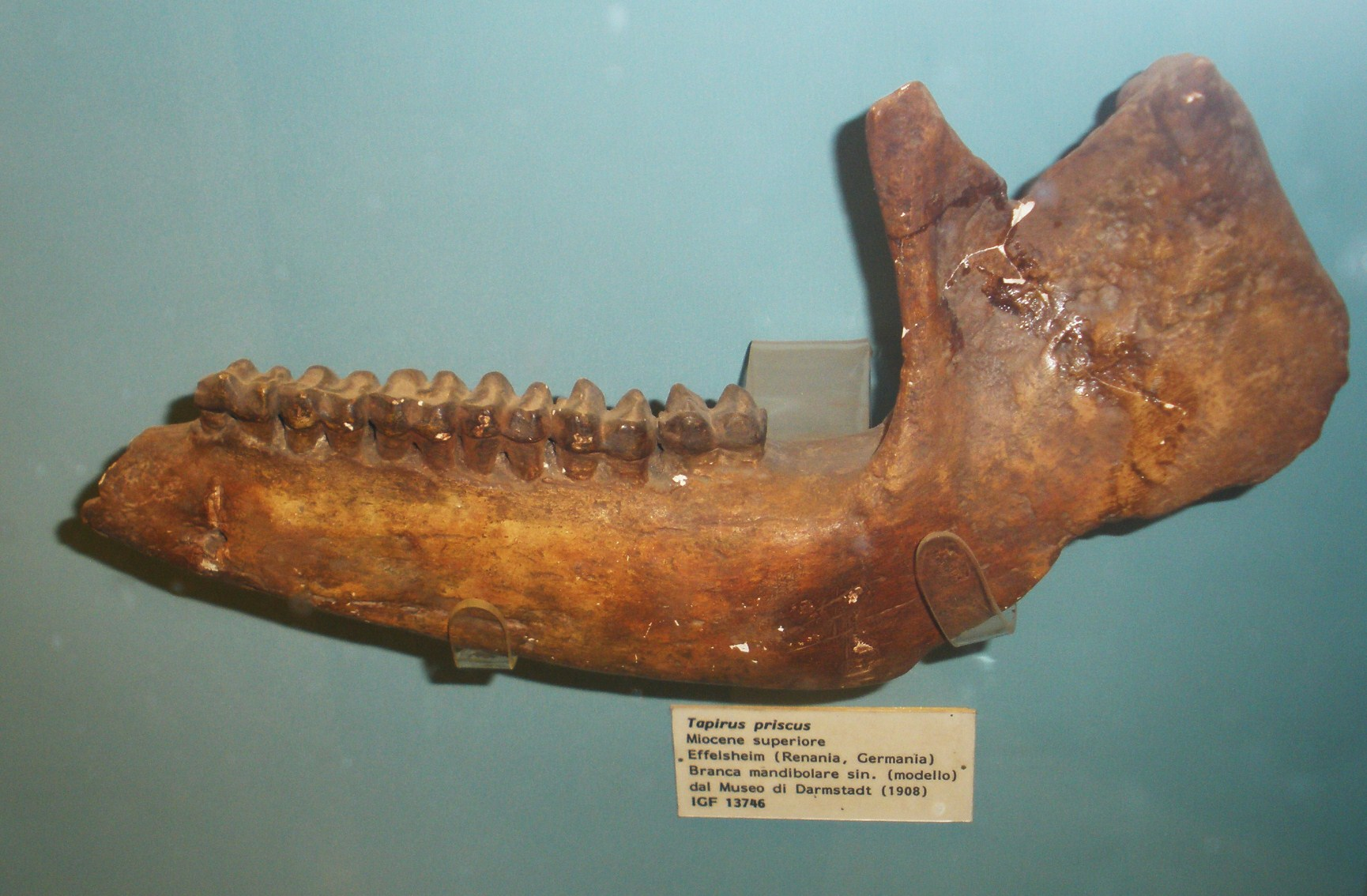
Tapirus Priscus mandible

Tapirus priscus is an extinct species of tapirid in the genus Tapirus that lived in Europe during the Late Miocene subepoch.

== Palaeobiology ==
On the basis of the similarity of its occlusal surface area in both its mandibular and maxillary dental arcades to the modern Malayan tapir (Tapirus indicus), it is believed that T. priscus fed on seeds.
