= Neodiapterna erichsoni =

Scientific classification
- Kingdom: Animalia
- Phylum: Arthropoda
- Clade: Pancrustacea
- Class: Insecta
- Order: Coleoptera
- Suborder: Polyphaga
- Infraorder: Scarabaeiformia
- Family: Scarabaeidae
- Genus: Neodiapterna
- Species: N. erichsoni

Binomial name
- Neodiapterna erichsoni (Harold, 1861)

Synonyms
- Aphodius erichsoni Harold, 1861

Species of beetle

Neodiapterna erichsoni is a species of beetle of the family Scarabaeidae. It is found in Argentina, Brazil (Paraná, Rio Grande do Sul, Santa Catarina, São Paulo) and Paraguay.

== Description ==
Adults reach a length of about 7–9 mm (0.28–0.35 in). The pronotum has large punctures amply distributed on the disc and lateral margins. The posterior angles are obtuse, ending in a subtle but evident backwards projection.

== Life history ==
Specimens have been collected in Tapirus and horse feces.
