= Tapirus cristatellus =

Tapirus cristatellus Temporal range: Late Pleistocene

Scientific classification
- Kingdom: Animalia
- Phylum: Chordata
- Class: Mammalia
- Order: Perissodactyla
- Family: Tapiridae
- Genus: Tapirus
- Species: †T. cristatellus

Binomial name
- †Tapirus cristatellus H. Winge, 1906

Extinct species of mammal

Tapirus cristatellus is an extinct species of tapir from the Pleistocene of South America. Remains are known from Brazil, specifically the states of Minas Gerais and Bahia.

The now extinct tapirs of Pleistocene North America may have been derived from T. cristatellus.
