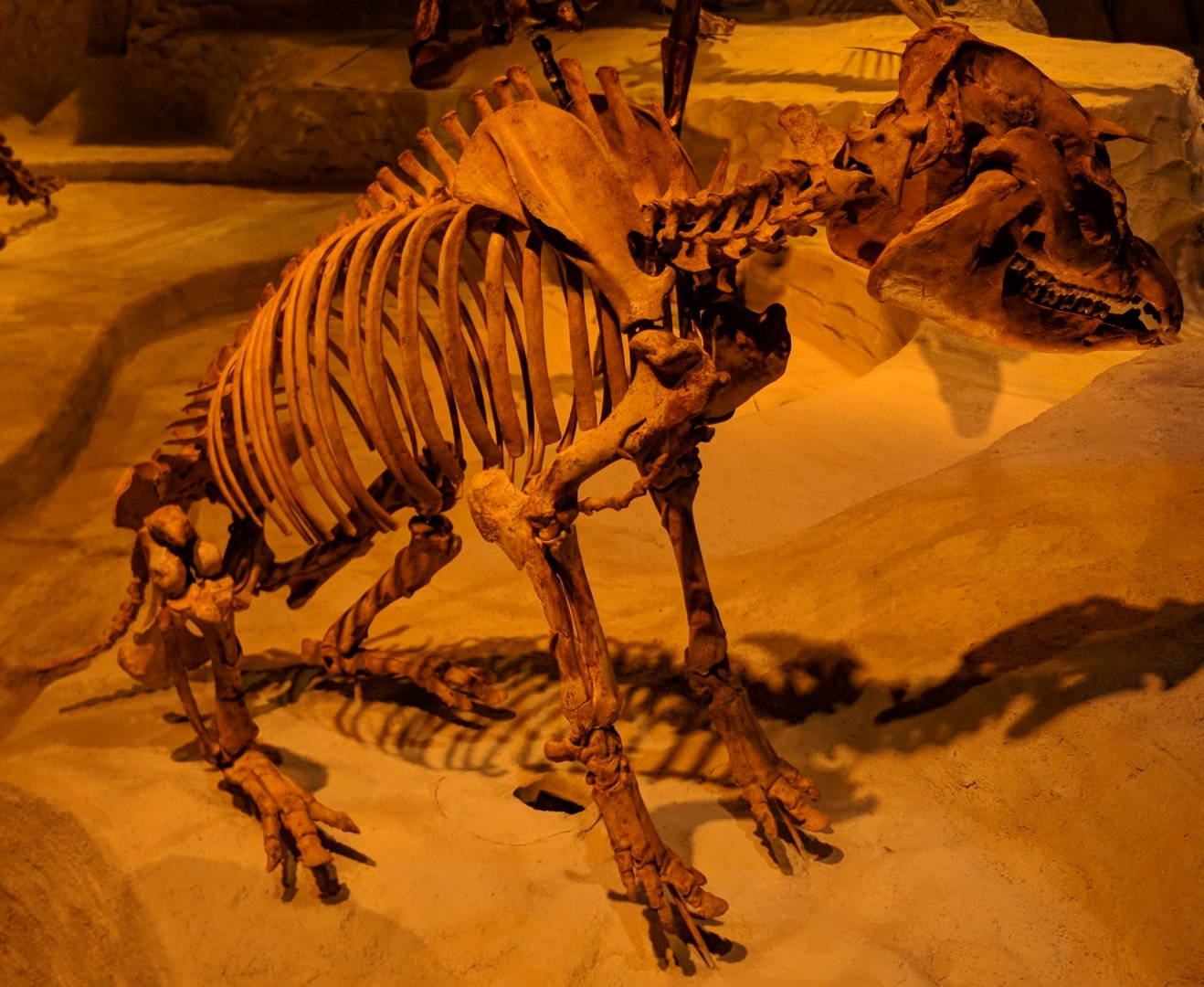

Scientific classification
- Kingdom: Animalia
- Phylum: Chordata
- Class: Mammalia
- Order: Perissodactyla
- Family: Tapiridae
- Genus: Tapirus
- Species: †T. webbi

Binomial name
- †Tapirus webbi Hulbert, 2005

= Tapirus webbi =

Tapirus webbi Temporal range: 9.5–8 Ma Late Miocene

Extinct species of tapir

Tapirus webbi is an extinct species of tapir that once lived in North America during the Late Miocene subepoch. It was originally believed to be identical to Tapirus simpsoni, and it is known only from Alachua County and Levy County in northern Florida.

== Palaeoecology ==
At Love Bone Bed, the ^{87}Sr/^{86}Sr values for T. webbi were substantially higher than those of the equids and proboscideans. This almost certainly is reflective of the diet of T. webbi consisting of high amounts of aquatic plants.
