= Tapirus simpsoni =

Tapirus simpsoni Temporal range: Pliocene

Scientific classification
- Kingdom: Animalia
- Phylum: Chordata
- Class: Mammalia
- Order: Perissodactyla
- Family: Tapiridae
- Genus: Tapirus
- Species: †T. simpsoni

Binomial name
- †Tapirus simpsoni Schultz et al., 1975

Extinct species of tapir

Tapirus simpsoni is an extinct species of tapir that lived in Nebraska during the Pliocene epoch.

Tapirus simpsoni was described in 1975 together with Tapirus johnsoni, and was larger than it. Late Miocene fossils from Florida were considered to have belonged to T. simpsoni until 2005, when they were reclassified as belonging to a new species, Tapirus webbi.
