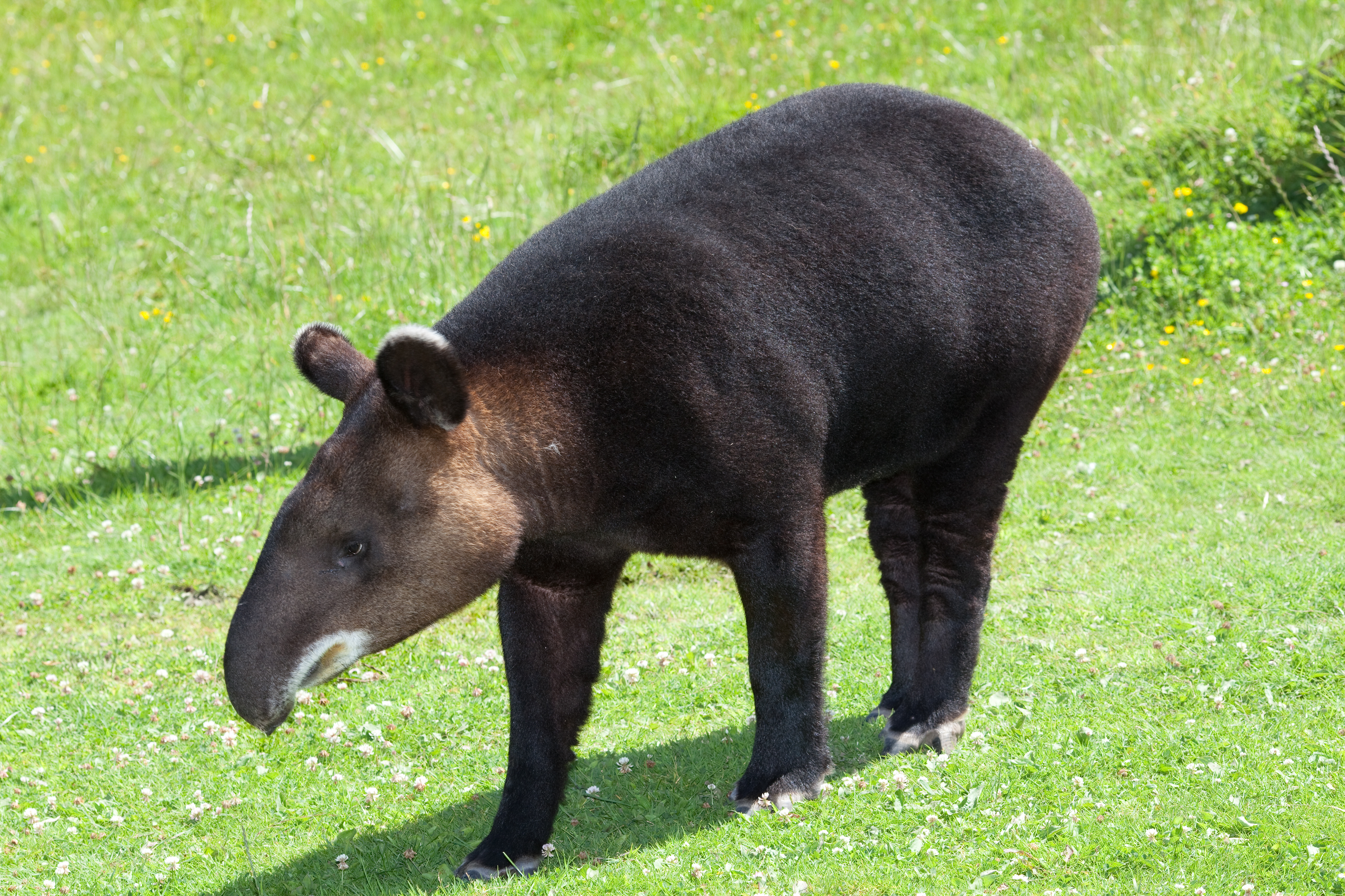

Conservation status
- Endangered (IUCN 3.1)
- CITES Appendix I

Scientific classification
- Kingdom: Animalia
- Phylum: Chordata
- Class: Mammalia
- Order: Perissodactyla
- Family: Tapiridae
- Genus: Tapirus
- Species: T. pinchaque

Binomial name
- Tapirus pinchaque (Roulin, 1829)
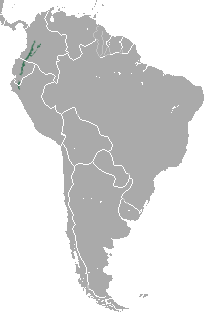
- Mountain tapir range

= Mountain tapir =

Species of mammal

The mountain tapir, also known as the Andean tapir or woolly tapir (Tapirus pinchaque), is the smallest of the four widely recognized species of tapir. It is found only in certain portions of the Andean Mountain Range in northwestern South America. As such, it is the only tapir species to live outside of tropical rainforests in the wild. It is most easily distinguished from other tapirs by its thick woolly coat and white lips.

The species name comes from the term "Pinchaque", an imaginary beast said to inhabit the same regions as the mountain tapir.

== Description ==
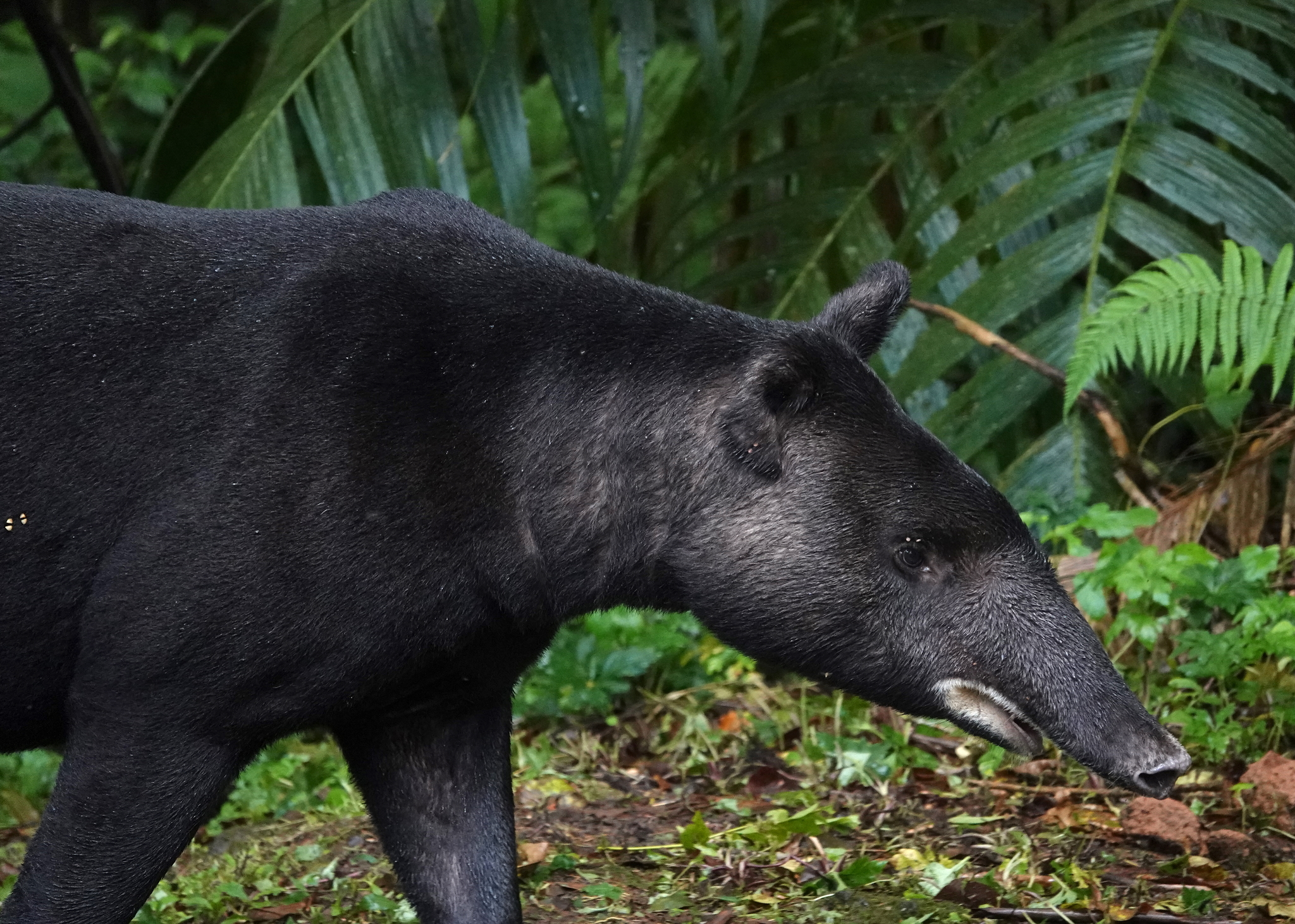
In Colombia

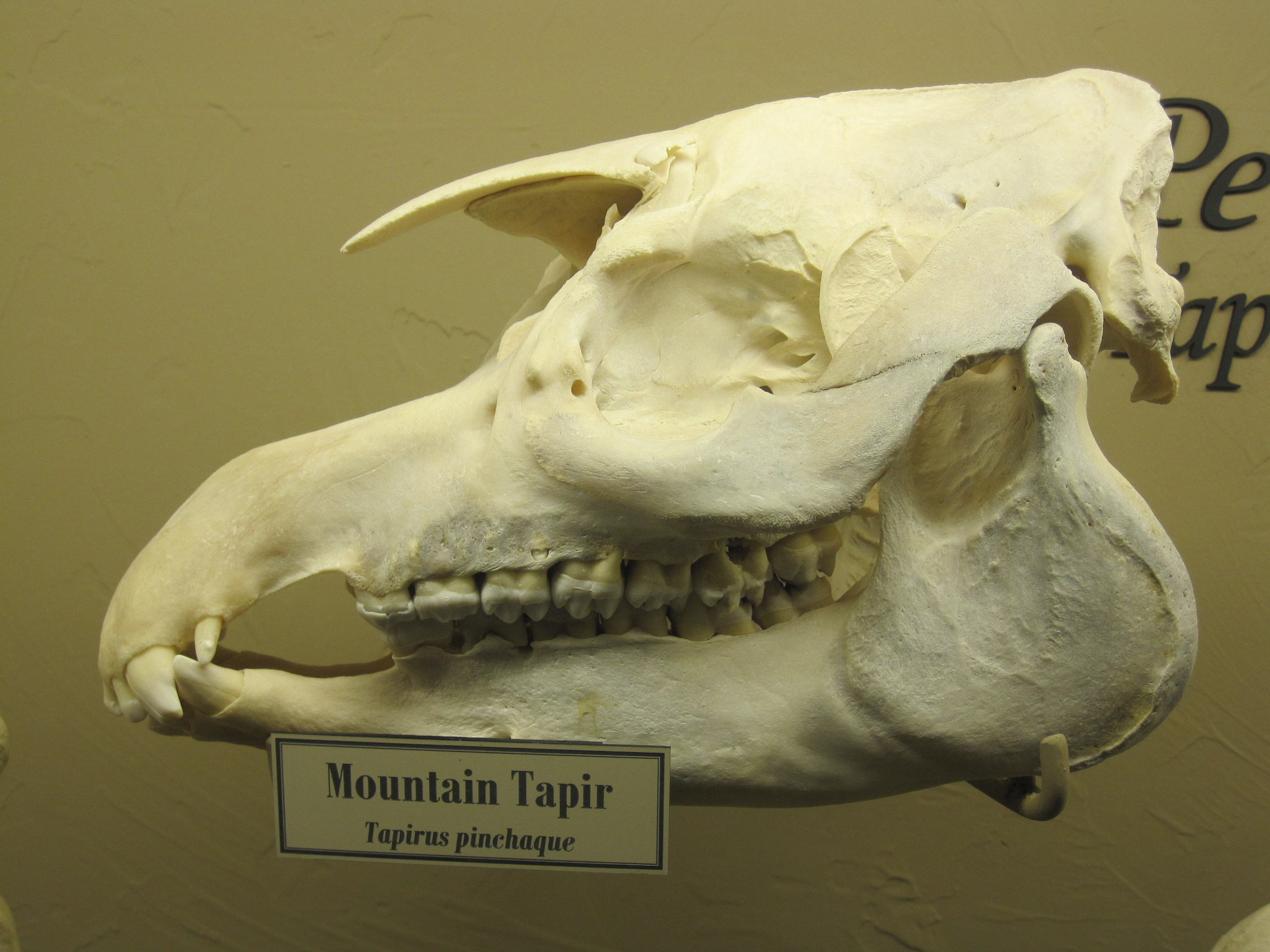
Mountain tapir skull on display at the Museum of Osteology

Mountain tapirs are black or very dark brown, with occasional pale hairs flecked in amongst the darker fur. The fur becomes noticeably paler on the underside, around the anal region, and on the cheeks. A distinct white band runs around the lips, although it may vary in extent, and there are usually also white bands along the upper surface of the ears. In adults, the rump has paired patches of bare skin, which may help to indicate sexual maturity. The eyes are initially blue, but change to a pale brown as the animal ages. Unlike all other species of tapir, the fur is long and woolly, especially on the underside and flanks, reaching 3.5 cm (1.4 in) or more in some individuals.

Adults are usually around 1.8 m (5 ft 11 in) in length and 0.75 to 1 m (2 ft 6 in to 3 ft 3 in) in height at the shoulder. They typically weigh between 136 and 250 kg (300 and 551 lb), and while the sexes are of similar size, females tend to be around 25 to 100 kg (55 to 220 lb) heavier than the males.

Like the other types of tapir, they have small, stubby tails and long, flexible proboscises. They have four toes on each front foot and three toes on each back foot, each with large nails and supported by a padded sole. A patch of bare skin, pale pink or grey in colour, extends just above each toe.

== Reproduction ==
Female mountain tapirs have a 30-day estrous cycle, and typically breed only once every other year. During courtship, the male chases the female and uses soft bites, grunts, and squeals to get her attention, while the female responds with frequent squealing. After a gestation period of 392 or 393 days, the female gives birth to a single young; multiple births are very rare.

Newborn mountain tapirs weigh about 5.4 to 6.2 kg (12 to 14 lb) and have a brown coat with yellowish-white spots and stripes. Like adults, baby mountain tapirs have thick, woolly fur to help keep them warm. Weaning begins at around three months of age. The immature coloration fades after about a year, but the mother continues to care for her young for around 18 months. Mountain tapirs reach sexual maturity at age three and have lived up to 27 years in captivity.

== Ecology ==
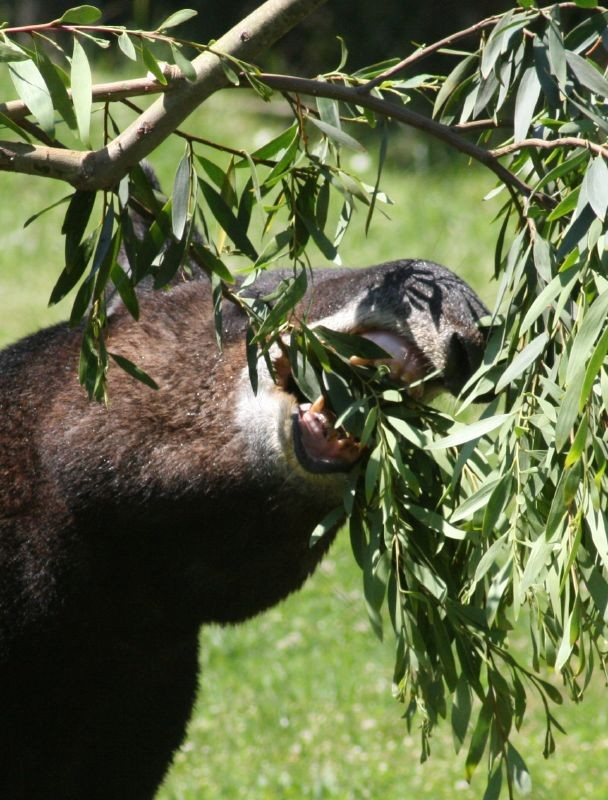
Mountain tapir feeding

Tapirs are herbivores, and eat a wide range of plants, including leaves, grasses, and bromeliads. In the wild, particularly common foods include lupins, Gynoxys, ferns, and umbrella plants. It also seeks out natural salt licks to satisfy its need for essential minerals.

Mountain tapirs are also important seed dispersers in their environments, and have been identified as a keystone species of the high Andes. A relatively high proportion of plant seeds eaten by mountain tapirs successfully germinate in their dung, probably due to a relatively inefficient digestive system and a tendency to defecate near water. Although a wide range of seeds are dispersed in this manner, those of the endangered wax palm seem to rely almost exclusively on mountain tapirs for dispersal, and this plant, along with the highland lupine, declines dramatically whenever the animal is extirpated from an area.

Predators of mountain tapirs include cougars, spectacled bears, and, less commonly, jaguars. Attacks by invasive domestic dogs have also been reported.

== Behavior ==
When around other members of their species, mountain tapirs communicate through high-pitched whistles, and the males occasionally fight over estrous females by trying to bite each other's rear legs. But for the most part, mountain tapirs are shy and lead solitary lives, spending their waking hours foraging for food on their own along well-worn tapir paths. Despite their bulk, they travel easily through dense foliage, up the steep slopes of their hilly habitats, and in water, where they often wallow and swim.

Mountain tapirs are generally crepuscular, although they are more active during the day than other species of tapirs. They sleep from roughly midnight to dawn, with an additional resting period during the hottest time of the day for a few hours after noon, and prefer to bed down in areas with heavy vegetation cover. Mountain tapirs forage for tender plants to eat. When trying to access high plants, they will sometimes rear up on their hind legs to reach and then grab with their prehensile snouts. Though their eyesight is lacking, they get by on their keen senses of smell and taste, as well as the sensitive bristles on their proboscises.

Males will frequently mark their territory with dung piles, urine, and rubbings on trees, and females will sometimes engage in these behaviors, as well. The territories of individuals usually overlap, with each animal claiming over 800 hectares (3.1 sq mi), and females tend to have larger territories than males.

== Distribution and habitat ==
The mountain tapir is found in the cloud forests and páramo of the Eastern and Central Cordilleras mountains in Colombia, Ecuador, and the far north of Peru. Its range may once have extended as far as western Venezuela, but it has long been extirpated from that region. It commonly lives at elevations between 2,000 and 4,300 metres (6,600 and 14,100 ft), and since at this altitude temperatures routinely fall below freezing, the animal's woolly coat is essential. During the wet season, mountain tapirs tend to inhabit the forests of the Andes, while during the drier months, they move to the páramo, where fewer biting insects pester them.

The mountain tapir has no recognised subspecies.

In Peru, it is protected in the National Sanctuary Tabaconas Namballe. The species needs continuous stretches of cloud forest and páramo, rather than isolated patches, to successfully breed and maintain a healthy population, and this obstacle is a major concern for conservationists trying to protect the endangered animal.

== Evolution ==
The mountain tapir is the least specialised of the living species of tapir, and has changed the least since the origin of the genus in the early Miocene. Genetic studies have shown that mountain tapirs diverged from its closest relative, the Brazilian tapir, in the late Pliocene, around three million years ago. This would have been shortly after the formation of the Panamanian Isthmus, allowing the ancestors of the two living species to migrate southward from their respective points of origin in Central America as part of the Great American Interchange. However, the modern species most likely originated in the Andes, some time after this early migration.

Molecular dating methods based on three mitochondrial cytochrome genes found T. pinchaque to be within a paraphyletic T. terrestris complex.

- Tapirus
  - - T. bairdii(Baird's tapir)
    - - T. kabomani(little black tapir)
      - - T. terrestris(South American tapir, Ecuador cluster)
        - T. pinchaque(mountain tapir)
        - T. terrestris(South American tapir, other clusters)
  - T. indicus(Malayan tapir)

== Vulnerability ==
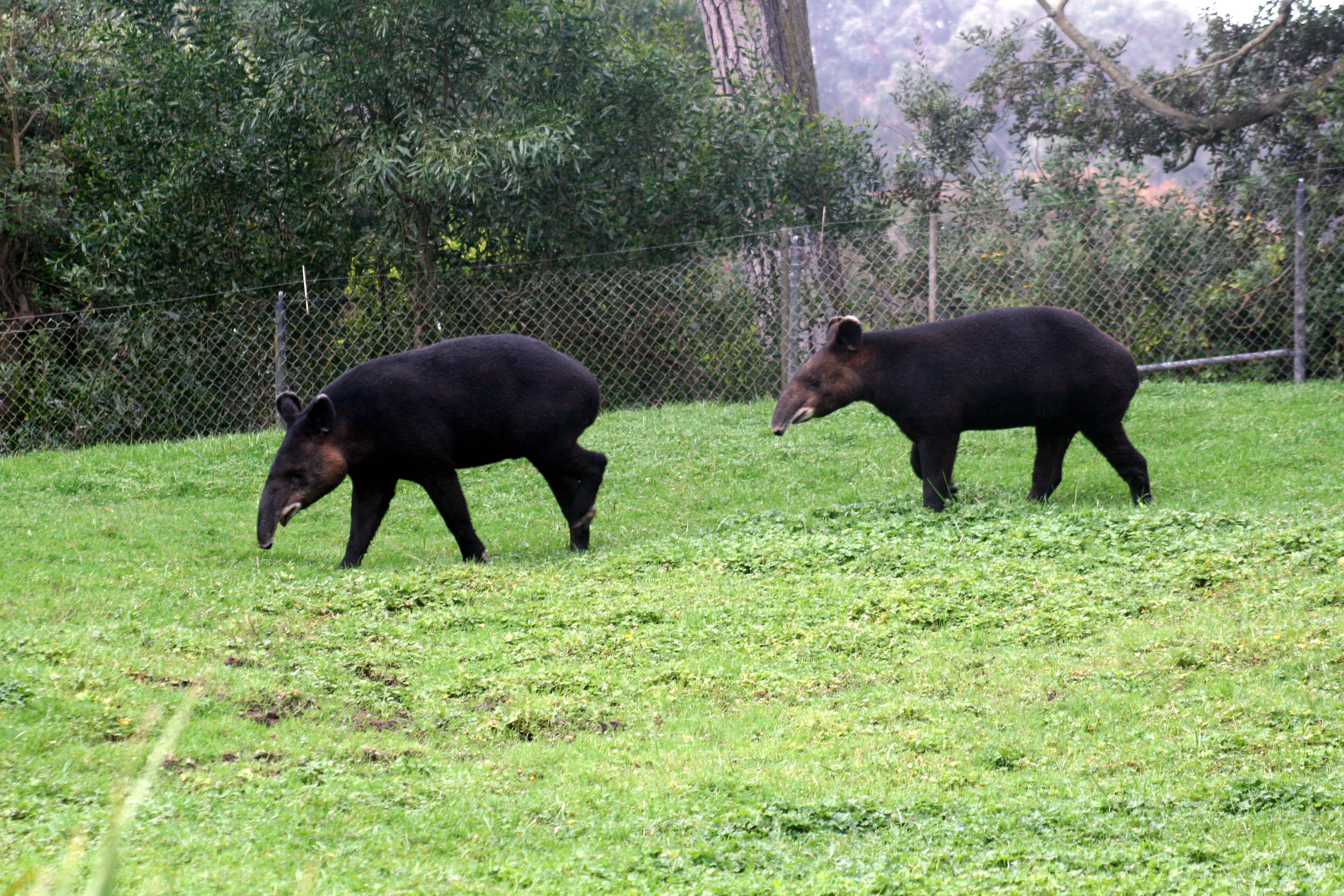
Two mountain tapirs in San Francisco Zoo

The mountain tapir is the most threatened of the five Tapirus species, classified as "Endangered" by the IUCN in 1996. According to the IUCN, there was a 20% chance the species could have been extinct as early as 2014. Due to the fragmentation of its surviving range, populations may already have fallen below the level required to sustain genetic diversity.

Historically, mountain tapirs have been hunted for their meat and hides, while the toes, proboscises, and intestines are used in local folk medicines and as aphrodisiacs. Since they will eat crops when available, they are also sometimes killed by farmers protecting their produce. Today, deforestation for agriculture and mining, along with poaching are the main threats to the species.

There may be only 2,500 individuals left in the wild today, making it all the more difficult for scientists to study them. Additionally, the species is also incredibly rare in captivity, with only a handful of breeding pairs left in zoos worldwide. Currently, only the Los Angeles Zoo and the Cali Zoo in Colombia still keep and display mountain tapirs.

In Canada, a mating pair was kept in Langley, BC, at the Mountain View Conservation and Breeding Centre prior to its closure. All of the individuals in captivity are descendants of just two founder animals. This represents a distinct lack of genetic diversity and may not bode well for their continued existence in human care.

== Video/Multimedia ==
- Video - Mountain Tapirs at the San Francisco Zoo
