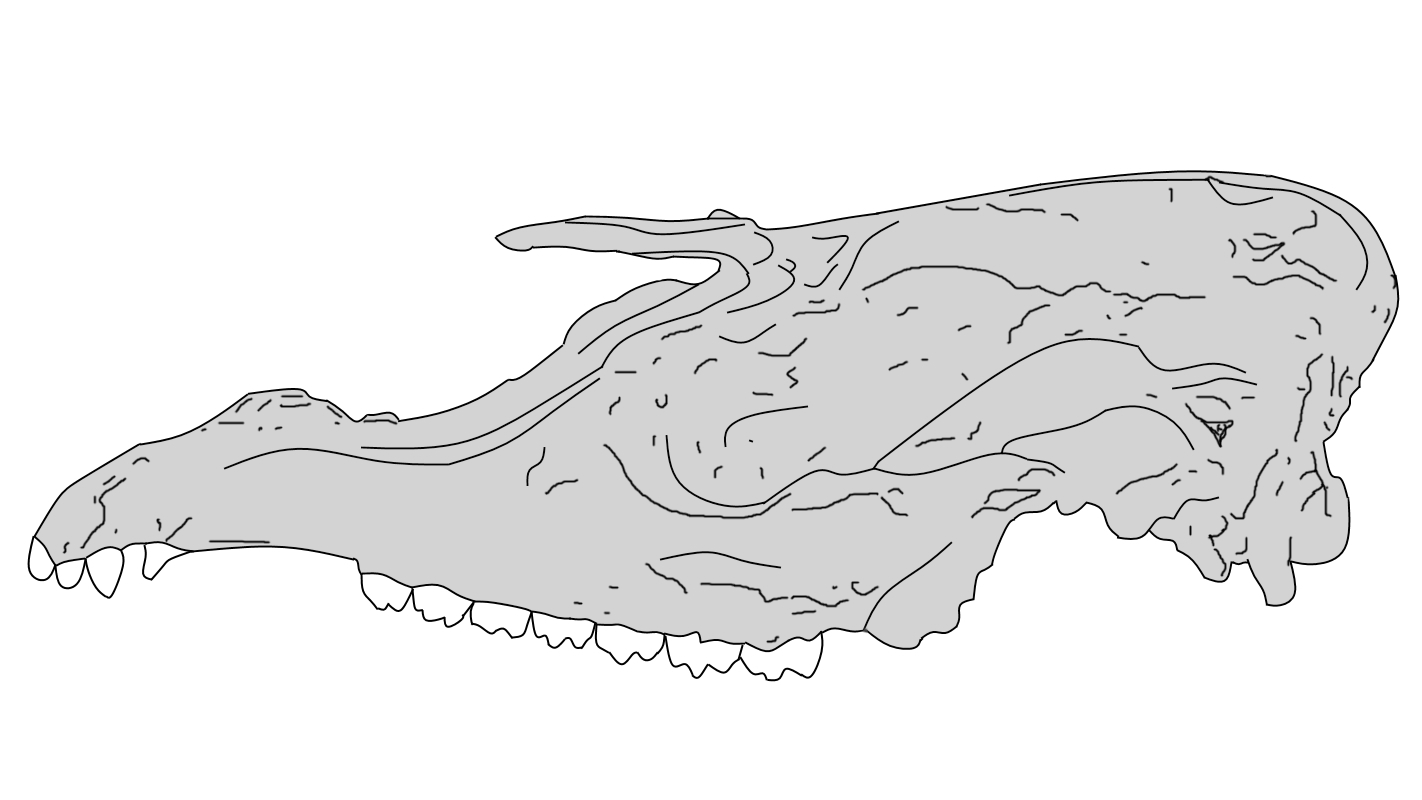

Scientific classification
- Kingdom: Animalia
- Phylum: Chordata
- Class: Mammalia
- Infraclass: Placentalia
- Order: Perissodactyla
- Family: Tapiridae
- Genus: Tapirus
- Species: †T. johnsoni

Binomial name
- †Tapirus johnsoni Schultz et al., 1975

= Tapirus johnsoni =

Tapirus johnsoni Temporal range: Pliocene

Extinct species of tapir

Tapirus johnsoni is an extinct species of tapir that lived in Nebraska during the Pliocene epoch.

Tapirus johnsoni is one of the older known tapirs and shows an increase in size from the earlier Tapirus polkensis. It was described in 1975 together with Tapirus simpsoni.
