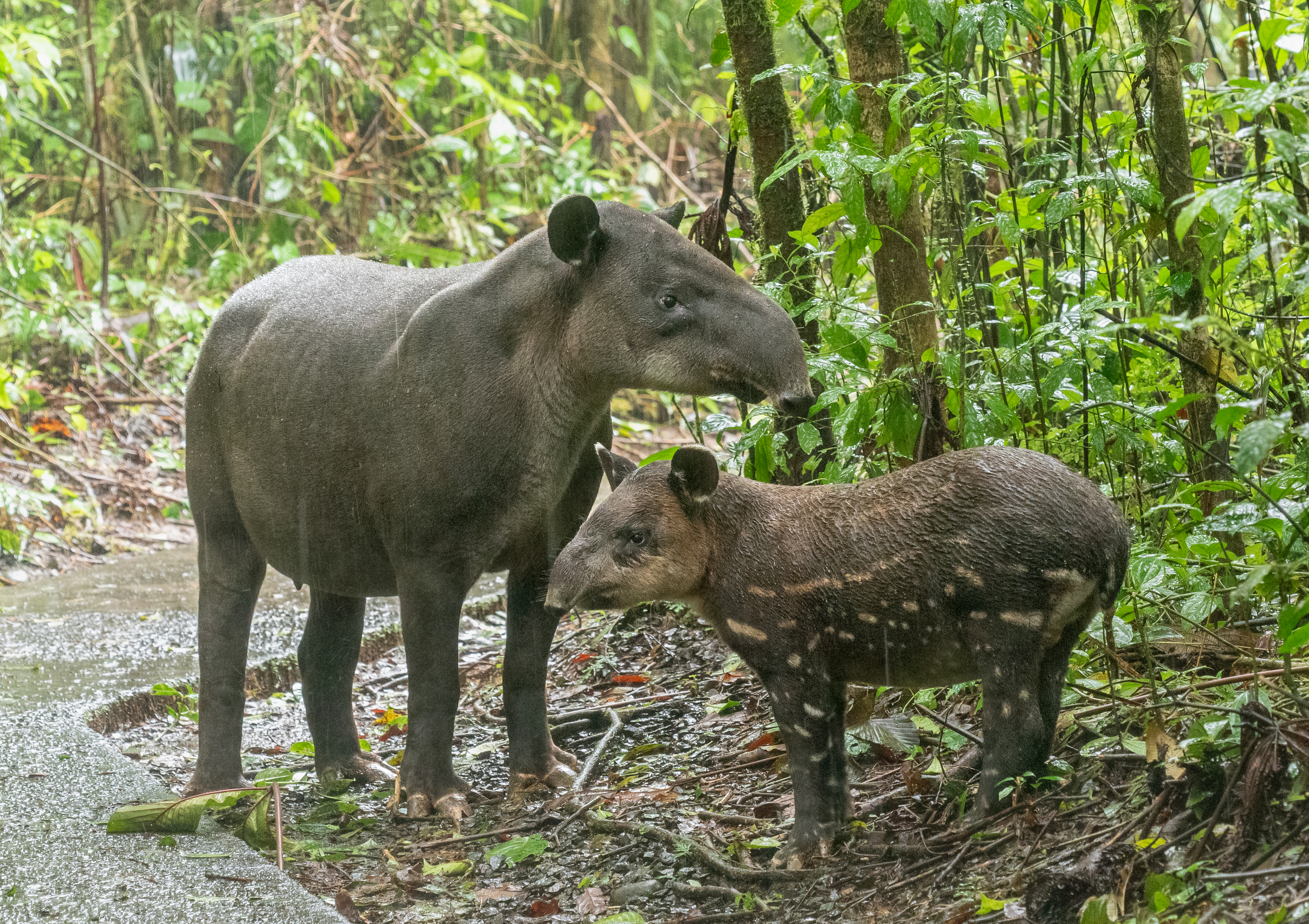
- Baird's tapir mother and juvenile in Alajuela Province, Costa Rica

Conservation status
- Endangered (IUCN 3.1)
- CITES Appendix I

Scientific classification
- Kingdom: Animalia
- Phylum: Chordata
- Class: Mammalia
- Order: Perissodactyla
- Family: Tapiridae
- Genus: Tapirus
- Species: T. bairdii

Binomial name
- Tapirus bairdii (Gill, 1865)
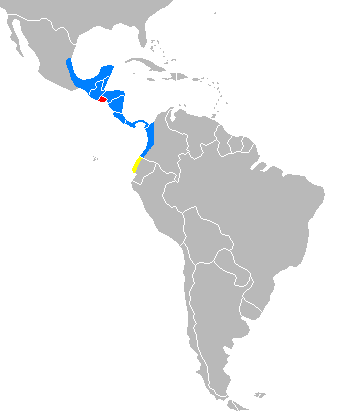
- Current distribution in blue, historic distribution in red, uncertain range in yellow

Synonyms
- Tapirella bairdii

= Baird's tapir =

Species of mammal

The Baird's tapir (Tapirus bairdii), also known as the Central American tapir, is a species of tapir native to Mexico, Central America, and northwestern South America. It is the largest of the three species of tapir native to the Americas, as well as the largest native land mammal in both Central and South America.

== Names ==
The Baird's tapir is named after the American naturalist Spencer Fullerton Baird, who traveled to Mexico in 1843 and observed the animals. However, the species was first documented by another American naturalist, W. T. White.

Like the other American tapirs (the mountain tapir and the South American tapir), the Baird's tapir is commonly called danta by people in all areas. In the regions around Oaxaca and Veracruz, it is referred to as the anteburro. Panamanians, and Colombians call it macho de monte, and in Belize, where the Baird's tapir is the national animal, it is known as the mountain cow.

In Mexico, it is called tzemen in Tzeltal; in Lacandon, it is called cash-i-tzimin, meaning "jungle horse" and in Tojolab'al it is called niguanchan, meaning "big animal". In Panama, the Guna people call the Baird's tapir moli in their colloquial language (Tule kaya), oloalikinyalilele, oloswikinyaliler, or oloalikinyappi in their political language (Sakla kaya), and ekwirmakka or ekwilamakkatola in their spiritual language (Suar mimmi kaya).

== Habitat ==
The Baird's tapir is found in many diverse vegetation types. They can withstand elevations from sea level to up to 3,600 m (11,800 ft). The animal can be found in wet areas like mangrove forests, marshes, swamp areas, and wet tropical rainforests. It also resides in drier areas like riparian woodlands, deciduous forests, and mountainous cloud forests. It prefers secondary growth forests, when available, due to increase in understory plants for foraging and protection. Food and water availability as well as protection are key factors in habitat selection.

== Description ==
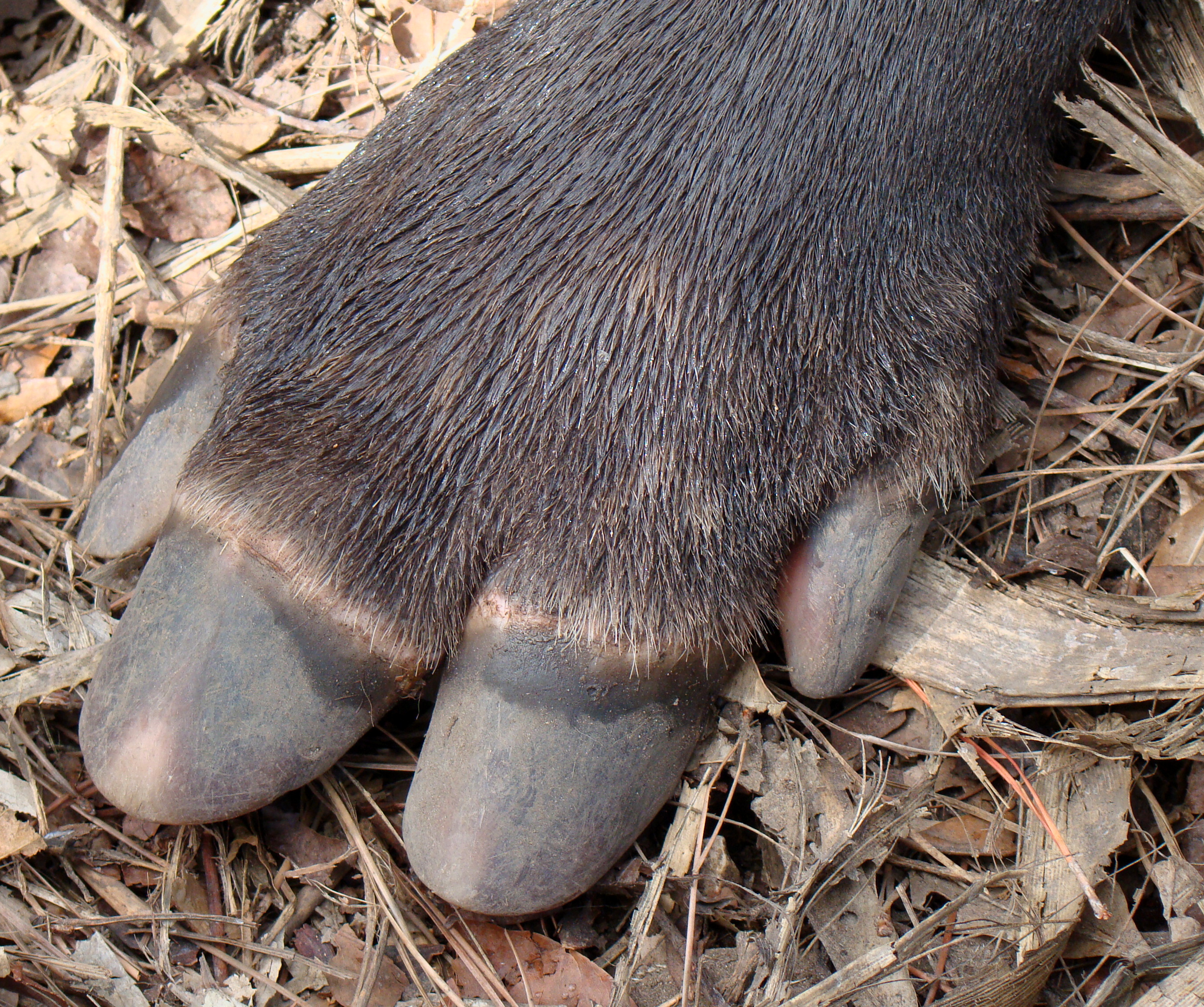
Front foot

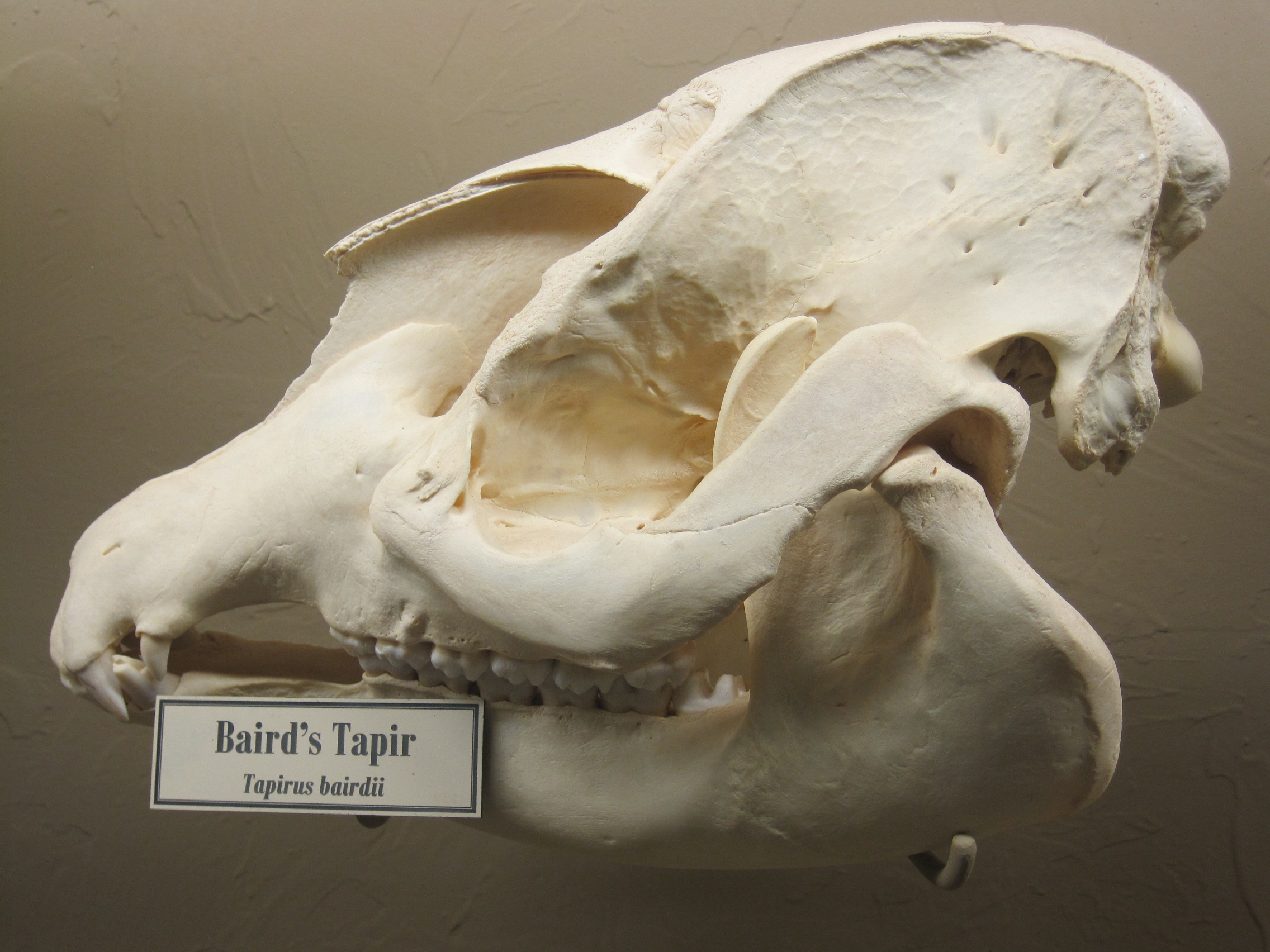
A Baird's tapir skull on display at the Museum of Osteology, Oklahoma City, Oklahoma

The Baird's tapir has a distinctive cream-colored marking on its face, throat, and tips of its ears, with a dark spot on each cheek, behind and below the eye. The rest of its bristly hair is dark brown or grayish brown. The animal is very muscly, and about the size of a small donkey. A long thin mane is present but not always conspicuous. It has two small oval shaped eyes flush with the side of the head. Its ears are large, oval-shaped and not very mobile. Baird's tapirs average 2 m (6 ft 7 in) in length, but can range between 1.8 and 2.5 m (5 ft 11 in and 8 ft 2 in), not counting a stubby, vestigial tail of 5–13 cm (2.0–5.1 in), and 73–120 cm (29–47 in) in height. Body mass in adults can range from 150 to 300 kg (330 to 660 lb). Like the other species of tapirs, they have small, stubby tails. Their snout and upper lips project forward to create a fleshy and flexible proboscis. This proboscis is their strongest sense organ that aids in finding food and detecting physical stimuli. Their legs are short and slender, well adapted to rapid movement through underbrush. They have four toes on each front foot, and three toes on each back foot.

== Lifecycle ==
The gestation period is about 400 days, after which one offspring is born to an average mass of 9.4 kg (21 lb). Multiple births are extremely rare, but in September 2020, a Baird's tapir in Boston's Franklin Park Zoo birthed twins. The babies, as with all species of tapir, have reddish-brown hair with white spots and stripes. This pattern creates a camouflage which affords them excellent protection in the shady understory of the forest. This pattern eventually fades into the adult coloration.

For the first week of their lives, infant Baird's tapirs are hidden in secluded locations while their mothers forage for food and return periodically to nurse them. Later, the young follow their mothers on feeding expeditions. At three weeks of age, the young are able to swim. Weaning occurs after one year, and sexual maturity is usually reached 6 to 12 months later. Baird's tapirs can live for over 30 years.

== Behavior ==
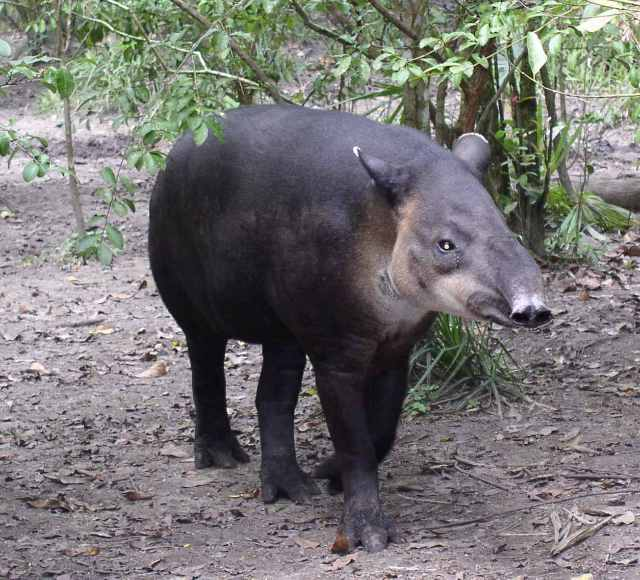
Baird's tapir: sniffing

The Baird's tapir may be active at all hours, but is primarily nocturnal. It forages for leaves and fallen fruit, using well-worn tapir paths which zigzag through the thick undergrowth of the forest. The animal usually stays close to water and enjoys swimming and wading – on especially hot days, individuals will rest in a watering hole for hours with only their heads above water. When in danger, these animals will seek water.

It generally leads a solitary life, though small feeding groups are not uncommon, and individuals, especially those of different ages (young with their mothers, juveniles with adults), are often observed together. The animals communicate with one another through shrill whistles and squeaks. In the mating season, males can engage in extreme fights to have access to females and end up with severe injuries.

When the Baird's tapir mate, they form long-term monogamous pairs. These pairs are known to defend territory. Though they can breed at any point in the year, it is most common prior to rainy seasons. Both parents take part in raising the children, as they move and sleep together as a unit. The mother will guide young by a nudging movement with her proboscis.

=== Ecological relationships ===
The Baird's tapir has a symbiotic relationship with cleaner birds that remove ticks from its fur: the yellow-headed caracara (Milvago chimachima) and the black vulture (Coragyps atratus) have both been observed removing and eating ticks from tapirs. Baird's tapirs often lie down for cleaning, and also present tick-infested areas to the cleaner birds by lifting its limbs and rolling from one side to the other.

These animals also have a marginal but noted effect as seed dispersers. Guanacaste (Enterolobium cyclocarpum), Sapodilla (Manilkara zapota), and Encina (Quercus oleoides) have all found to be sometimes passable through the tapir digestive system. The intense chewing of these hard seeds serve to scarify them before germination and can improve the seed's likelihood of success.

=== Diet ===
The Baird's tapir is herbivorous, rummaging from the forest floor to 1.5 metres (4 ft 11 in) over the ground. Leaves from an assortment of plant types provide the greater part of their eating regimen, yet they likewise eat twigs, blossoms, hedges, grasses, and fruits. Fruits tend to be favorable when in season, but it depends on its availability. Dietary makeup of plant species additionally fluctuates with season. The presence of armor or biting insects on a plant does not hinder them from consuming that plant. They burn through the majority of their waking hours foraging in a zigzag fashion.

These animals lean toward plant types of medium to tall level, yet the main plants that are totally kept away from are small, widely dispersed seedlings and large shade-level trees. By and large, it will move onto another plant before each of the leaves are consumed on the one it is presently eating. They commonly feed in enormous tree falls or secondary forests because of the great thickness of understory plants which are for, the most part, exceptionally digestible and have not many protective poisons. Once in a while they will ascend on their rear feet to arrive at leaves past their ordinary reach, or knock down slim or dead plants to get fruit or leaves. The absorption of nutrients in light of the huge volume and extreme diversity of recognizable plant parts in their excrement is by all accounts poor.

=== Potential danger to humans ===
Attacks on humans are rare and normally in self-defense. In 2006, Carlos Manuel Rodríguez Echandi, the former Costa Rican Minister of Environment and Energy, was attacked and injured by a Baird's tapir after he followed it off the trail.

Due to their size, adults can be potentially dangerous to humans, and should not be approached if spotted in the wild. The animal is most likely to follow or chase a human for a bit, though they have been known to charge and bite humans on rare occasions.

== Threats ==
According to the IUCN, the Baird's tapir is endangered. There are many contributing factors in the decline of the species, including loss of habitat from deforestation, forest fires, and large scale industrial projects. In certain areas, poaching, disease transmission from domesticated animals, pollution of native water bodies, and the developing effects of climate change all threaten this species. Though the animal is only hunted by a few humans, any loss of life is a serious blow to the tapir population, especially because their reproductive rate is so slow.

== Conservation ==
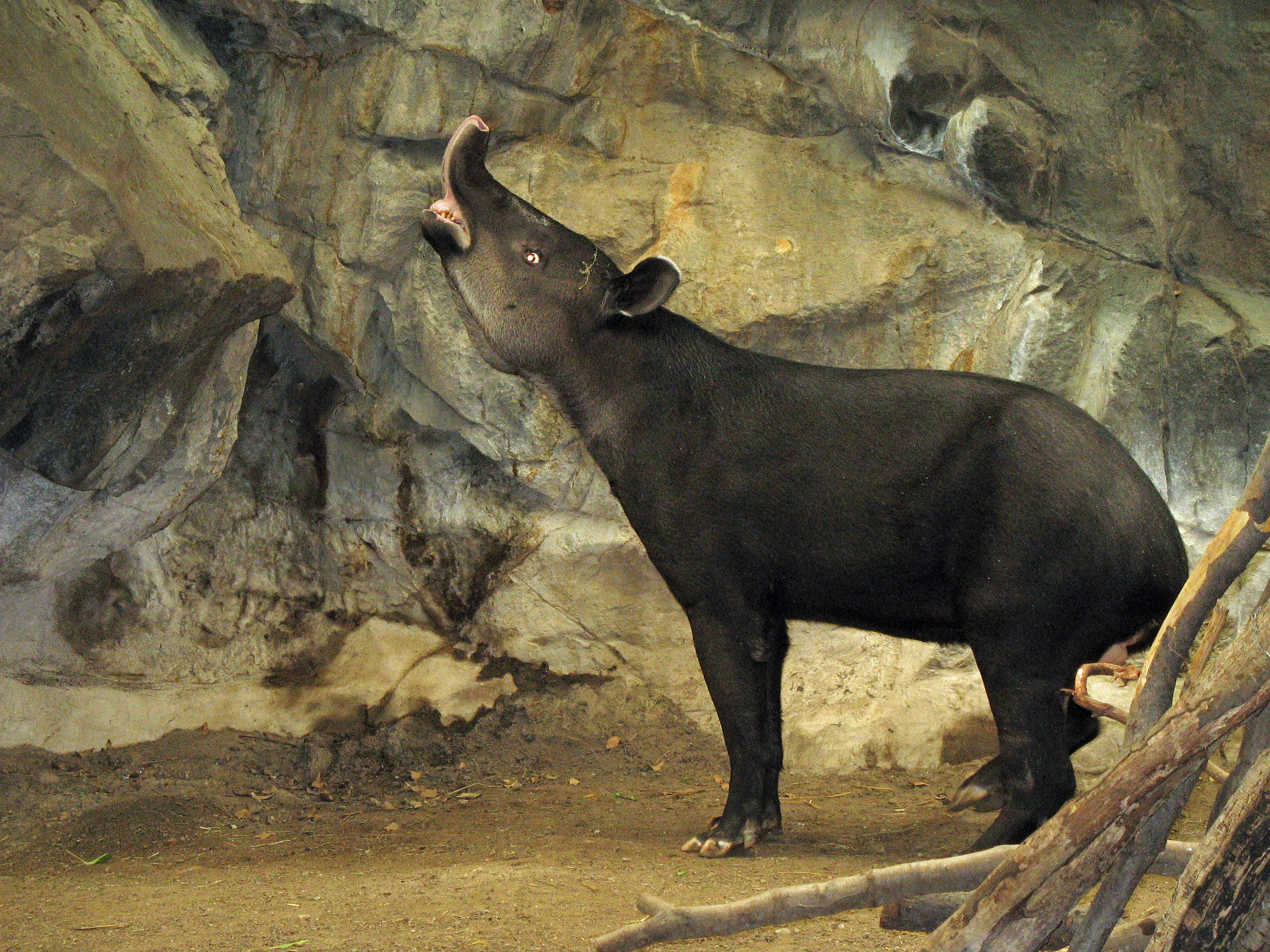
A Baird's tapir in a zoo, exhibiting the flehmen response

In Mexico, Belize, Guatemala, Costa Rica, and Panama, hunting of the Baird's tapirs is illegal, but the laws protecting them are often unenforced. The issues of illegal logging in conserved areas also threaten these animals. Therefore, many conservationists are urging for the protection of existing habitat by improving maintenance and protection in existing habitat, through strengthening partnership with indigenous territories. Goals also include re-establishing corridors of connection between existing habitat including the Mesoamerican Biological Corridor, and improving education of locals to uphold and protect biodiversity.

Captive breeding programs are helpful with many large terrestrial species, but there is a study showing a small population of Baird's tapirs in North American and Central American zoos had inbreeding and divergence from the wild population. Conservationists are urging for thoughtful approaches to breeding programs that focus on maintaining genetic diversity.

== Predators ==
Due to its size, an adult Baird's tapir has very few natural predators, with only large adult American crocodiles (4 metres or 13 feet or more) and adult jaguars capable of preying on Baird's tapirs. Even in these cases, the outcomes are unpredictable and often in the Baird's tapir's favor, as is evident on multiple Baird's tapirs documented in Corcovado National Park with large claw marks covering their hides. However, juveniles may be preyed on by smaller crocodiles and by pumas. In a remote video-monitor, a spectacled bear was captured attacking an adult tapir perhaps nearly twice its own body mass.
