= Libertad Formation =

Geologic formation in Uruguay

- Stratigraphic range: Lujanian; ~0.8–0.008 Ma
- Type: Geological formation
- Overlies: Raigón Formation

Location
- Country: Uruguay

Type section
- Named for: Libertad, Uruguay

The Libertad Formation is a Lujanian geologic formation in Uruguay.

== Fossil content ==
The following fossils have been reported from the formation:

Mammals

- Glyptodon
- Notiomastodon platensis
- Tapirus olivaresi

Birds

- Giganhinga

== See also ==
- List of fossiliferous stratigraphic units in Uruguay
