= Cali Zoo =

Zoo in Cali, Colombia

Zoologico de Cali
- Flamingos
- Interactive map of Zoologico de Cali
- 3°26′55″N 76°33′31″W
- Date opened: 1981
- Location: Santiago de Cali, Valle del Cauca
- Land area: 10 hectares (25 acres)
- No. of animals: 1200
- No. of species: 180
- Memberships: ALPZA
- Website: www.zoologicodecali.com.co

Cali Zoo is located in the city of Cali in the country of Colombia. The Zoo belongs to a foundation that carries its name and whose mission, since it took the zoo's administration in 1981, has been to improve the animals' diet, their natural environment, and the medical care of the existing fauna.

Cali Zoo promotes and performs different educational, recreational and investigative programs.

The Cali Zoo's 10 hectares (25 acres) are home to about 1,200 animals, representing some 180 species – from lemurs to condors. The Cali River runs through the zoo's park-like grounds.

== History ==
The zoo started with animals in narrow and dirty cages, with basic levels of care and feeding. With local government support and contributions from citizens, Cali Zoo began a transformation into a modern zoo. The old cages were replaced with new comfortable and spacious exhibits. Animals were relocated according to their species, rather than the prior indistinct organization. The Cali Zoo Foundation started focusing on the dietary requirements of each species. Finally, preventative medicine became a new focus. The zoo's surroundings were also redesigned and restored.

Later, Cali Zoo's administration started a complete medical collection of each animal's records, which allowed it to have accurate and organized information so it could provide better care. With these basic necessities satisfied, Cali Zoo could lead its objectives to research and preserve the different Colombian wild species.

== Exhibits ==
The zoo has five sections for different kinds of species: primates, butterflies, ocean and river fish, amphibians and reptiles, and birds.

- Primates: These species have six different environments with artificial trees, walls and elements that resemble own features of the ecosystems where primates inhabit. Colombia has more than 450 mammalian species - 7% of the world total. The country has 30 primates species, the second highest of any tropical country in the Americas. and the fifth most diverse country in the world.
- Butterflies: Cali Zoo has more than 800 different butterflies species. They are located in a place called mariposario where they are free and the visitors can walk within the place. The mariposario also shows a video that depicts the butterfly's metamorphosis in all its stages.
- Ocean and River fish: This exhibition consists of 9 fresh water aquariums and 10 salt water aquariums.
- Amphibians and Reptiles: Serpents, crocodiles and poison frogs are a small sample of the extensive Colombian biodiversity. Colombia has 520 reptile species, the third most of any country.
- Birds: Cali Zoo offers a real humid tropical forest that shelters diverse Colombian species. The Country has more than 1.800 different bird species, some 20% of the world total and 60% of those that inhabit South America.
- Owls, and Pacaranas: this exhibit was opened in early 2011 and contains 5 species of owls and 1 species of mammal which is the pacarana (Dinomys branickii) it has an education centre and a trail with binoculars and telescopes pointing at some owl nests and houses. it is also divided in 4 aviaries.
- Teatrino: The teatrino is an amphitheatre for roleplays and animal shows.

== Services ==
Cali Zoo offers summer camps during school vacations where children between 4 and 12 years old learn how the animals live in the zoo, their behaviors and current habits. They also learn how veterinarians take care of them and how to prepare food for the animals. These activities are complemented with recreational activities as well. The zoo also offers Environment Formation Workshops for professors.

== Animals ==
Birds at the zoo include scarlet macaws, blue-and-yellow macaws, red-and-green macaws, great green macaws, chestnut-fronted macaws, amazon parrots, keel-billed toucans,white cockatoos, Andean condors, black-chested buzzard-eagles, laughing kookaburra, black swans, emus, common ostriches, grey crowned cranes, jabiru, American flamingos, helmeted curassows,spectacled owls, great hornbills and Andean cock-of-the-rock.

Mammals at the zoo include giant otters, Neotropical otters, red kangaroos, capybaras, giant anteaters, coppery titis, tufted capuchins, Colombian spider monkeys, Guianan squirrel monkeys, ring-tailed lemurs, collared brown lemurs,red-necked wallabies, meerkats, hamadryas baboons, african painted dogs, lar gibbons, lions, Bengal tigers (including a white tiger), jaguars, pumas, spectacled bears,pacaranas, South American coatis, blackbuck, white-tailed deer, collared peccaries, mountain tapirs, South American tapirs and Grant's zebras.

Reptiles and amphibians at the zoo include poison dart frogs, gold tegus, central bearded dragons, Burmese pythons, green anacondas, Orinoco crocodiles, spectacled caimans,Komodo dragons, perenties, and several species of turtles and venomous snakes.

== The Future ==
- Australian outback: This exhibit is in the design stage and consists of an innmertion exhibit with parma and bennets wallaby, emus, kookaburras, cockatoos and black swan. There will be a gift shop at the end of the exhibit.
- Jaziquima: Currently under construction, this new habitat is an Amazon themed area, with 6 species of primates, from woolly monkeys to capuchin monkeys. It will be elevated and for this the old exhibits will be demolished.
