= Tapirus greslebini =

Tapirus greslebini Temporal range: Pleistocene

Scientific classification
- Domain: Eukaryota
- Kingdom: Animalia
- Phylum: Chordata
- Class: Mammalia
- Order: Perissodactyla
- Family: Tapiridae
- Genus: Tapirus
- Species: †T. greslebini

Binomial name
- †Tapirus greslebini Rusconi, 1934

Species of mammal

Tapirus greslebini is an extinct species of tapir that lived in South America during the Pleistocene.

It was originally described by Carlos Rusconi in 1934, from remains collected in the Puelchense sands of Villa Ballester in Buenos Aires, Argentina.

T. greslebini is one of seven Pleistocene South American tapirs to be considered valid.
