= Neodiapterna =

Scientific classification
- Kingdom: Animalia
- Phylum: Arthropoda
- Clade: Pancrustacea
- Class: Insecta
- Order: Coleoptera
- Suborder: Polyphaga
- Infraorder: Scarabaeiformia
- Family: Scarabaeidae
- Subfamily: Aphodiinae
- Tribe: Aphodiini
- Genus: Neodiapterna; Dellacasa, 1984

Genus of beetles

Neodiapterna is a genus of beetles of the family Scarabaeidae.

== Species ==
- Neodiapterna erichsoni (Harold, 1861)
- Neodiapterna tognoni (Dellacasa & Dellacasa, 1997)
