= Tapirus rioplatensis =

Tapirus rioplatensis Temporal range: 2–1 Ma Pleistocene

Scientific classification
- Domain: Eukaryota
- Kingdom: Animalia
- Phylum: Chordata
- Class: Mammalia
- Order: Perissodactyla
- Family: Tapiridae
- Genus: Tapirus
- Species: †T. rioplatensis

Binomial name
- †Tapirus rioplatensis Cattoi, 1957

Species of mammal

Tapirus rioplatensis is an extinct species of tapir that lived in South American swamps and forests during the Pleistocene and was probably the ancestor of all South American tapirs alive today.
