= Tapirus oliverasi =

Tapirus oliverasi Temporal range: Early Pleistocene

Scientific classification
- Domain: Eukaryota
- Kingdom: Animalia
- Phylum: Chordata
- Class: Mammalia
- Order: Perissodactyla
- Family: Tapiridae
- Genus: Tapirus
- Species: †T. oliverasi

Binomial name
- †Tapirus oliverasi Ubilla, 1983

Extinct species of mammal

Tapirus oliverasi is likely an invalid extinct species of tapir from South America.

T. oliverasi was described based on dentary remains from the Early Pleistocene deposits at the Libertad Formation in Uruguay that were of larger size than that of T. terrestris but smaller than T. rioplatensis. However, the validity of species has been questioned and it is considered dubious.
