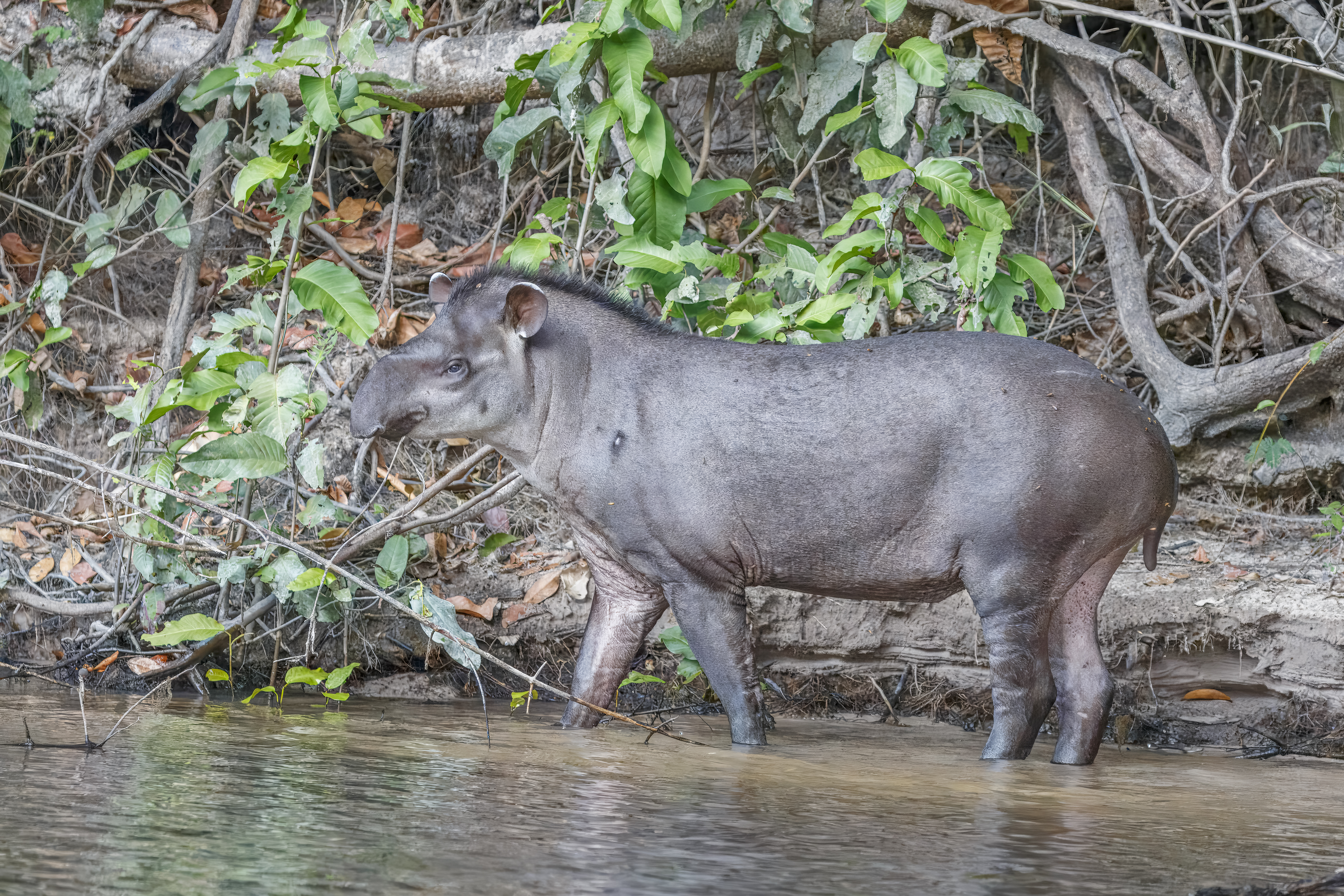
- South American tapir, a type species of Tapirus

Scientific classification
- Kingdom: Animalia
- Phylum: Chordata
- Class: Mammalia
- Infraclass: Placentalia
- Order: Perissodactyla
- Family: Tapiridae
- Genus: Tapirus; Brisson, 1762

Type species
- Hippopotamus terrestris (=today is Tapirus terrestris) Linnaeus, 1758

Species
- T. bairdii; T. indicus; T. pinchaque; T. terrestris; For extinct species, see text

Synonyms
- About 12: Acrocodia Goldman, 1913 (also as an independent genus or subgenus); Chinchecus Trouessart, 1898; Cinchacus Gray, 1873; Elasmognathus Gill, 1865; Hydrochoerus Gray, 1821 (nomen nudum); Pinchacus Hershkovitz, 1954 (also as an subgenus of Tapirus); Rhinochoerus Wagler, 1830; Syspotamus Billburg, 1827; Tapir Blumenbach, 1779; Tapyra Liais, 1872; Tapirella Palmer, 1903 (also as an subgenus of Tapirus); Tapirussa Frisch, 1775

= Tapirus =

Tapirus Temporal range: 16–0 Ma Miocene – Recent

Genus of tapir

Tapirus is a genus of tapir which contains the living tapir species. The Malayan tapir is usually included in Tapirus as well, although some authorities have moved it into its own genus, Acrocodia.

== Extant species ==
Image	Common name	Scientific name	Distribution
	Baird's tapir (also called the Central American tapir)	Tapirus bairdii (Gill, 1865)	Mexico, Central America and northwestern South America.
	South American tapir (also called the Brazilian tapir or lowland tapir)	Tapirus terrestris (Linnaeus, 1758)	Venezuela, Colombia, and the Guianas in the north to Brazil, Argentina, and Paraguay in the south, to Bolivia, Peru, and Ecuador in the West
	Mountain tapir (also called the woolly tapir)	Tapirus pinchaque (Roulin, 1829)	Eastern and Central Cordilleras mountains in Colombia, Ecuador, and the far north of Peru.
	Malayan tapir (also called the Asian tapir, Oriental tapir or Indian tapir)	Tapirus indicus (Desmarest, 1819)	Indonesia, Malaysia, Myanmar, and Thailand

The Kabomani tapir was at one point recognized as another living member of the genus, but is now considered to be nested within T. terrestris.

== Evolution ==
The genus Tapirus first appeared during the Middle Miocene (around 16-10 million years ago), known fossils in both Europe (T. telleri) and North America (T. johnsoni and T. polkensis). The youngest tapir in Europe, Tapirus arvernensis became extinct at the end of the Pliocene, around 2.6 million years ago. In a 2011 mapping of mitochondrial DNA relationships between perissodactyls, the Malayan tapir was estimated to have diverged from the rest of the genus in Asia during the Oligocene. Tapirus dispersed into South America during the Early Pleistocene as part of the Great American Interchange, around 2.6-1 million years ago.

Tapirs suffered considerable extinctions at the end of the Pleistocene, and went completely extinct north of southern Mexico.

=== Fossil species ===
- †Tapirus arvernensis Croizet & Jobert, 1828
- †Tapirus augustus Matthew & Granger, 1923 - Formerly Megatapirus
- †Tapirus californicus Merriam, 1912
- †Tapirus cristatellus Winge, 1906
- †Tapirus greslebini Rusconi, 1934
- †Tapirus haysii Simpson, 1945
- †Tapirus johnsoni Schultz et al., 1975
- †Tapirus lundeliusi Hulbert, 2010
- †Tapirus merriami Frick, 1921
- †Tapirus mesopotamicus Ferrero & Noriega, 2007
- †Tapirus oliverasi Ubilla, 1983 - Invalid
- †Tapirus polkensis Olsen, 1860
- †Tapirus rioplatensis Cattoi, 1957
- †Tapirus rondoniensis Holanda et al., 2011
- †Tapirus sanyuanensis Huang & Fang, 1991
- †Tapirus simpsoni Schultz et al., 1975
- †Tapirus sinensis Owen, 1870
- †Tapirus tarijensis Ameghino, 1902
- †Tapirus veroensis Sellards, 1918
- †Tapirus webbi Hulbert, 2005
