= Tapirus tarijensis =

Tapirus tarijensis Temporal range: Pleistocene (Ensenadan) ~2.6–0.8 Ma

Scientific classification
- Kingdom: Animalia
- Phylum: Chordata
- Class: Mammalia
- Order: Perissodactyla
- Family: Tapiridae
- Genus: Tapirus
- Species: †T. tarijensis

Binomial name
- †Tapirus tarijensis Ameghino, 1902

Extinct species of mammal

Tapirus tarijensis is an extinct species of tapir that lived during the Pleistocene epoch. Fossils of the species have been found in the Tarija Formation of Bolivia.

== Palaeoecology ==
T. tarijensis is considered to have been a browsing herbivore, being one of the key members of the browser guild in the Tarija palaeocommunity.
