= François Désiré Roulin =

French explorer and scientist

François Désiré Roulin (August 1796 – 5 June 1874) was a French naturalist, physician and illustrator born in Rennes.

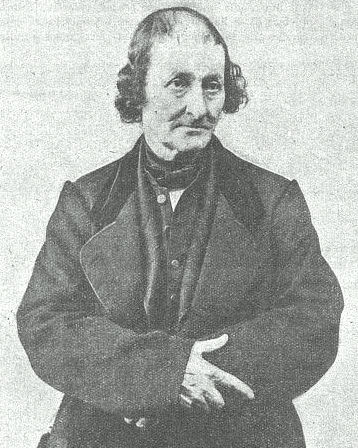
François Désiré Roulin in 1865

From 1815 to 1820, he studied medicine at the University of Paris. Roulin visited Colombia from 1822 to 1828, becoming an expert on the natural history of the country. In 1824 he served as a scientist on an expedition funded by the Colombian government to survey the Meta River, a tributary of the Orinoco River. In Colombia, he also inspected the gold mines at La Vega de Supía y Marmato, and traveled the Magdalena River. In addition, while in South America, he visited Venezuela, Peru and Ecuador.

Illustrations from his travels were used by Georges Cuvier in Le Règne Animal, and by Gaspard Theodore Mollien in Voyage dans la République de Colombie. Several of his watercolors were employed (with minor modifications) for the engravings that adorned Voyage pittoresque dans les deux Amériques (Paris, 1836), a book by Alcide Dessalines d'Orbigny.

In Paris, he served as a librarian at the Bibliothèque de l'Arsenal (from 1832), and later as a librarian of the Institut de France (from 1865). He published numerous articles in the following magazines: Le Globe, Le Temps, La Revue des Deux Mondes and Le Magasin picturesque.

Roulin was son-in-law to politician Joseph Blin (1764–1834), and an uncle to mathematician Joseph Bertrand (1822–1900) and archaeologist Alexandre Bertrand (1820–1902).
