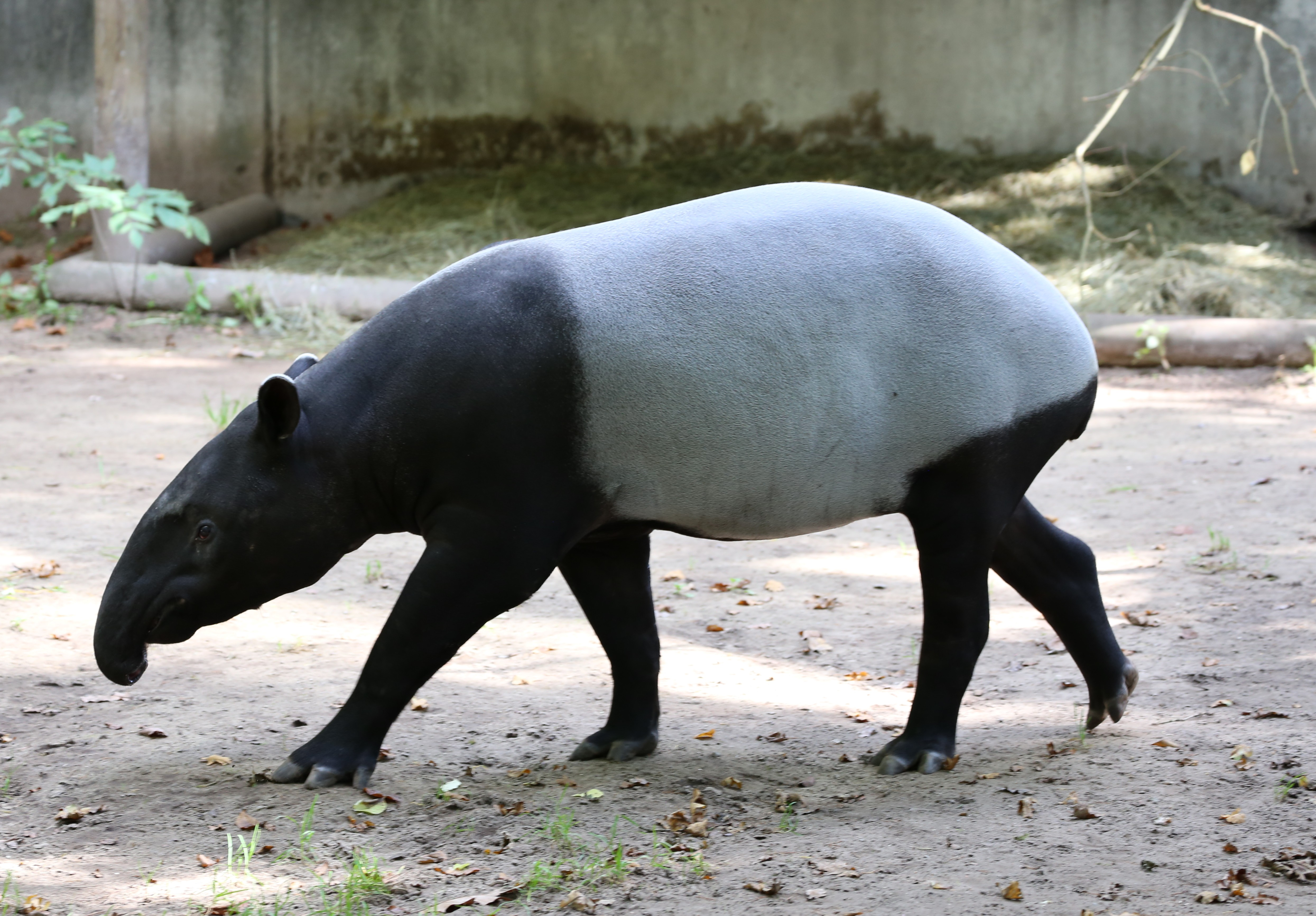
- Malayan tapir at Tiergarten Nürnberg in Nuremberg, Germany

Conservation status
- Endangered (IUCN 3.1)
- CITES Appendix I

Scientific classification
- Kingdom: Animalia
- Phylum: Chordata
- Class: Mammalia
- Order: Perissodactyla
- Family: Tapiridae
- Genus: Tapirus
- Species: T. indicus

Binomial name
- Tapirus indicus (Desmarest, 1819)

Subspecies
- T. indicus indicus, Desmarest, 1819; T. indicus brevetianus, Kuiper, 1926
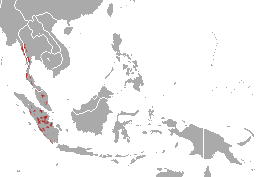
- Malayan tapir range

Synonyms
- Acrocodia indica

= Malayan tapir =

Species of mammal

The Malayan tapir (Tapirus indicus), also called Asian tapir, Asiatic tapir, oriental tapir, Indian tapir, piebald tapir, or black-and-white tapir, is the only living tapir species outside of the Americas. It is native to Southeast Asia from the Malay Peninsula to Sumatra. It has been listed as Endangered on the IUCN Red List since 2008, as the population is estimated to comprise fewer than 2,500 mature individuals.

== Taxonomy ==
The scientific name Tapirus indicus was proposed by Anselme Gaëtan Desmarest in 1819 who referred to a tapir described by Pierre-Médard Diard. Tapirus indicus brevetianus was coined by a Dutch zoologist in 1926 who described a black Malayan tapir from Sumatra that had been sent to Rotterdam Zoo in the early 1920s.

Phylogenetic analyses of 13 Malayan tapirs showed that the species is monophyletic. It was placed in the genus Acrocodia by Colin Groves and Peter Grubb in 2011. A comparison of mitochondrial DNA of 16 perissodactyl species revealed that the Malayan tapir forms a sister group to the Tapirus species native to the Americas. It was the first Tapirus species that genetically diverged from the group, and is estimated to have done so about 25 million years ago in the Late Oligocene.

== Description ==
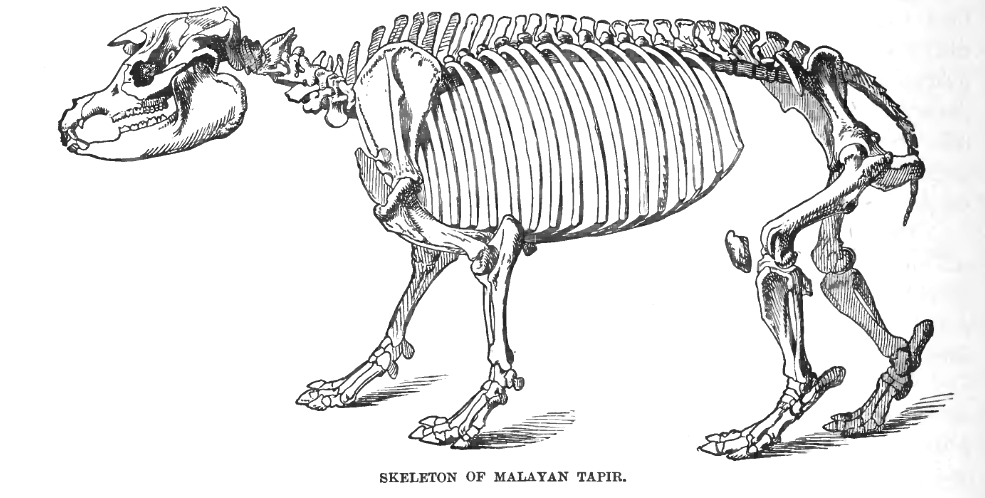
Sketch of a Malayan tapir skeleton

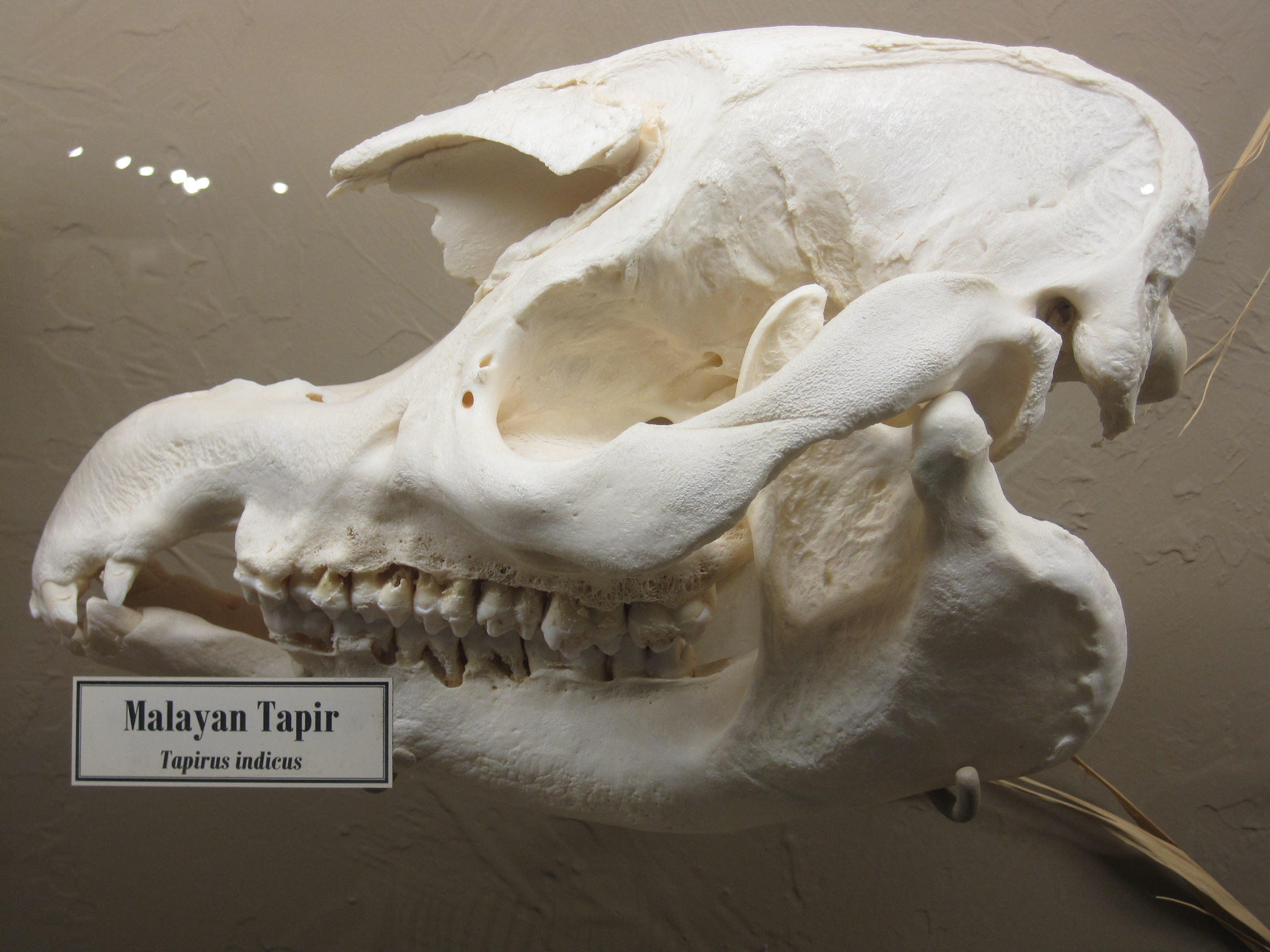
Photo of a Malayan tapir skull on display at the Museum of Osteology

The Malayan tapir is easily identified by its markings, most notably the light-colored patch that extends from its shoulders to its hindquarters. Black hair covers its head, shoulders, and legs, while white hair covers its midsection, rear, and the tips of its ears; these white edges around the rims of the outer ear as is true of other tapirs. The disrupted coloration breaks up its outline, providing camouflage by making the animal difficult to recognize against the varied terrain and dense flora of its habitat; potential predators may mistake it for a large rock, rather than prey, when it is lying down to sleep.

The Malayan tapir is the largest of the four extant tapir species and grows to between 1.8 and 2.5 m (5 ft 11 in and 8 ft 2 in) in length, not counting a stubby tail of only 5 to 10 cm (2.0 to 3.9 in) in length, and stands 90 to 110 cm (2 ft 11 in to 3 ft 7 in) tall. It typically weighs between 250 and 320 kg (550 and 710 lb), although some adults can weigh up to 540 kg (1,190 lb). The females are usually larger than the males. Like other tapir species, it has a small, stubby tail and a long, flexible proboscis. It has four toes on each front foot and three toes on each back foot. The Malayan tapir has rather poor eyesight, but excellent hearing and sense of smell.

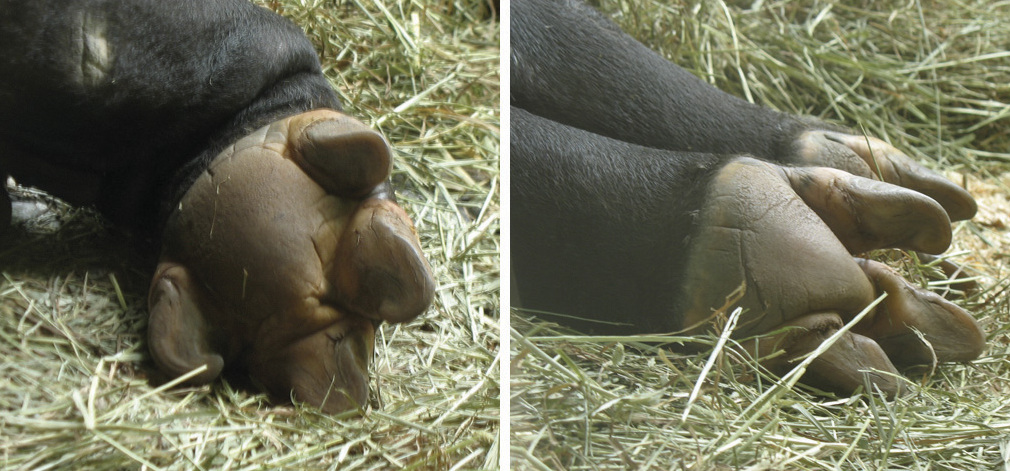
Underside of front (left) and back (right) hooves of the Malayan tapir

The tapir's unique proboscis is supported by several evolutionary adaptations of its skull. It has a large sagittal crest, unusually positioned orbits, an unusually shaped cranium with elevated frontal bones, and a retracted nasal incision as well as retracted facial cartilage. This evolutionary process is believed to have caused the loss of some cartilages, facial muscles, and the bony wall of the tapir's nasal chamber.

=== Vision ===
Malayan tapirs have very poor eyesight, both on land and in water, instead relying heavily on their excellent senses of smell and hearing to navigate and forage. Their eyes are small and, like many herbivores, positioned on the sides of the face. They have brown irises, but the corneas are often covered in a blue haze; this corneal cloudiness is thought to be caused by repetitive exposure to light. This loss of transparency impacts the ability of the cornea to transmit and focus outside light as it enters the eye, impairing the animal's overall vision. As these tapirs are most active at night on top of having poor eyesight, this habit may make it harder for them to search for food and avoid predators.

=== Color variation ===
Two melanistic Malayan tapirs were observed in Jerangau Forest Reserve in Malaysia in 2000. A black Malayan tapir was also recorded in Tekai Tembeling Forest Reserve in Pahang state in 2016.

== Distribution and habitat ==
The Malayan tapir lives throughout primary and secondary lowland tropical forests of Southeast Asia, including Sumatra in Indonesia, Peninsular Malaysia, Myanmar, and Thailand.

Pleistocene fossils were found in Java and other locations accompanied by herbivores more typical of grasslands, indicating that it evolved in more open habitats and retreated to closed forests in later times. It was found in Borneo until at least 8,000 years ago during the early Holocene in the Niah Caves of Sarawak, and some 19th century writers mentioned it as a contemporary species in Borneo, likely based on native accounts. It has been proposed to reintroduce the tapir to the island as a conservation measure.

In the continent, the Malayan tapir was found in historical times as far north as China. Tapir fossils establish a presence of the species in India and a stone carving on a coping stone from a Buddhist Site in Bhahrut, Madhya Pradesh, from the 2nd Century BC displays what is believed to be a Tapir with the author's description stating "angry, attacking sturdy animal with short limbs, with clear hooves, two in the front feet and three in the hind feet, a small trunk, oval-shaped and erect ears, and a smooth tail ending in a whisk".

== Behaviour and ecology ==
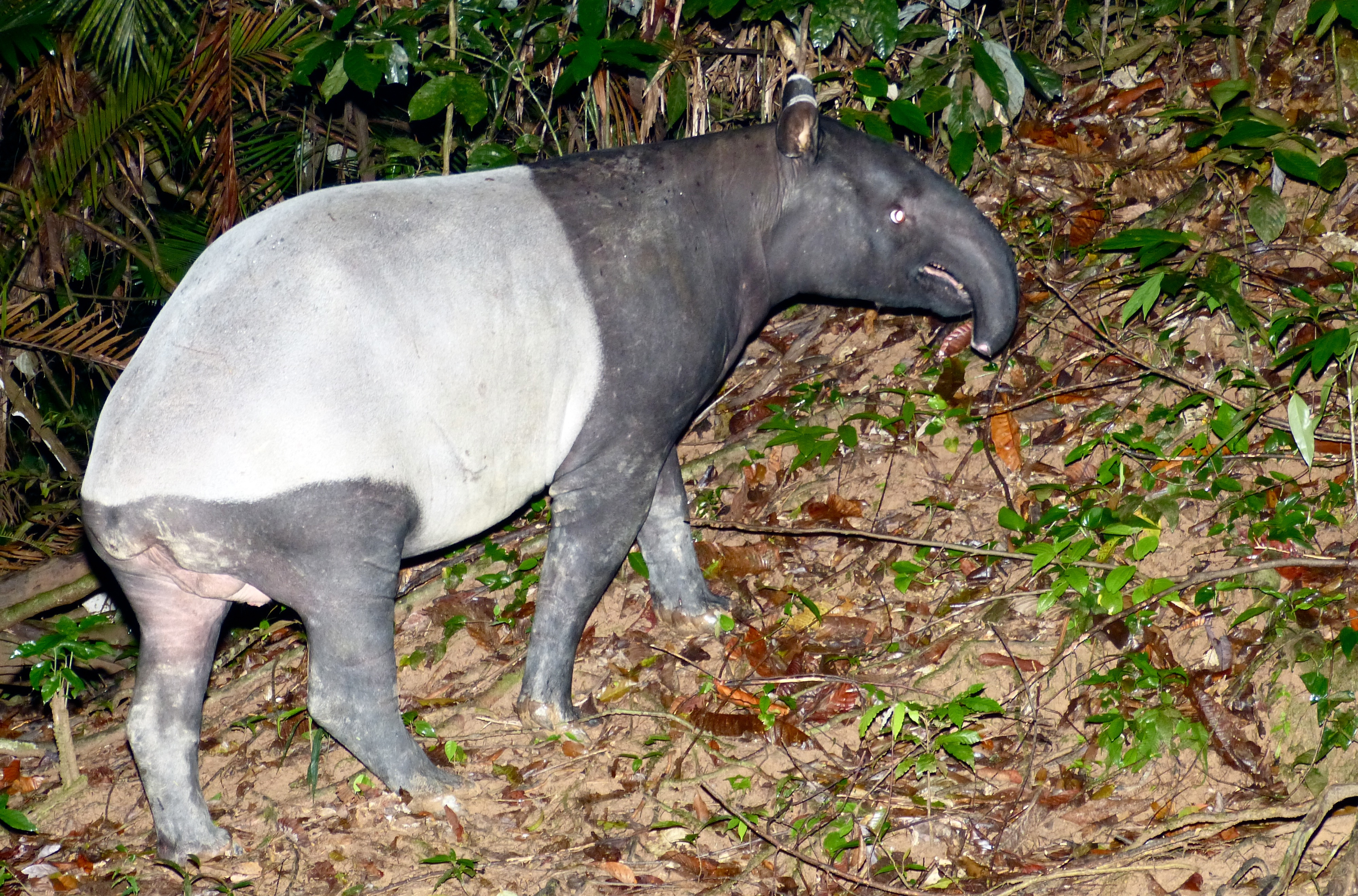
A Malayan tapir in Taman Negara National Park

Malayan tapirs are primarily solitary, marking out large tracts of land as their territory, though these areas usually overlap with those of other individuals. Tapirs mark out their territories by spraying urine on plants, and they often follow distinct paths which they have bulldozed through the undergrowth. Exclusively herbivorous, the animal forages for the tender shoots and leaves of more than 115 species of plants, of which around 30 are particularly preferred, moving slowly through the forest and pausing often to eat and note the scents left behind by other tapirs in the area. The tapir can run quickly when threatened or frightened, and if forced to fight can defend itself with its strong jaws and sharp teeth. Malayan tapirs communicate with high-pitched squeaks and whistles. They usually prefer to live near water and often bathe and swim, and they are also able to climb steep slopes. Tapirs are mainly active at night, though they are not exclusively nocturnal; because they tend to eat soon after sunset or before sunrise, and they will often nap in the middle of the night, they are considered to be crepuscular animals.

=== Life cycle ===
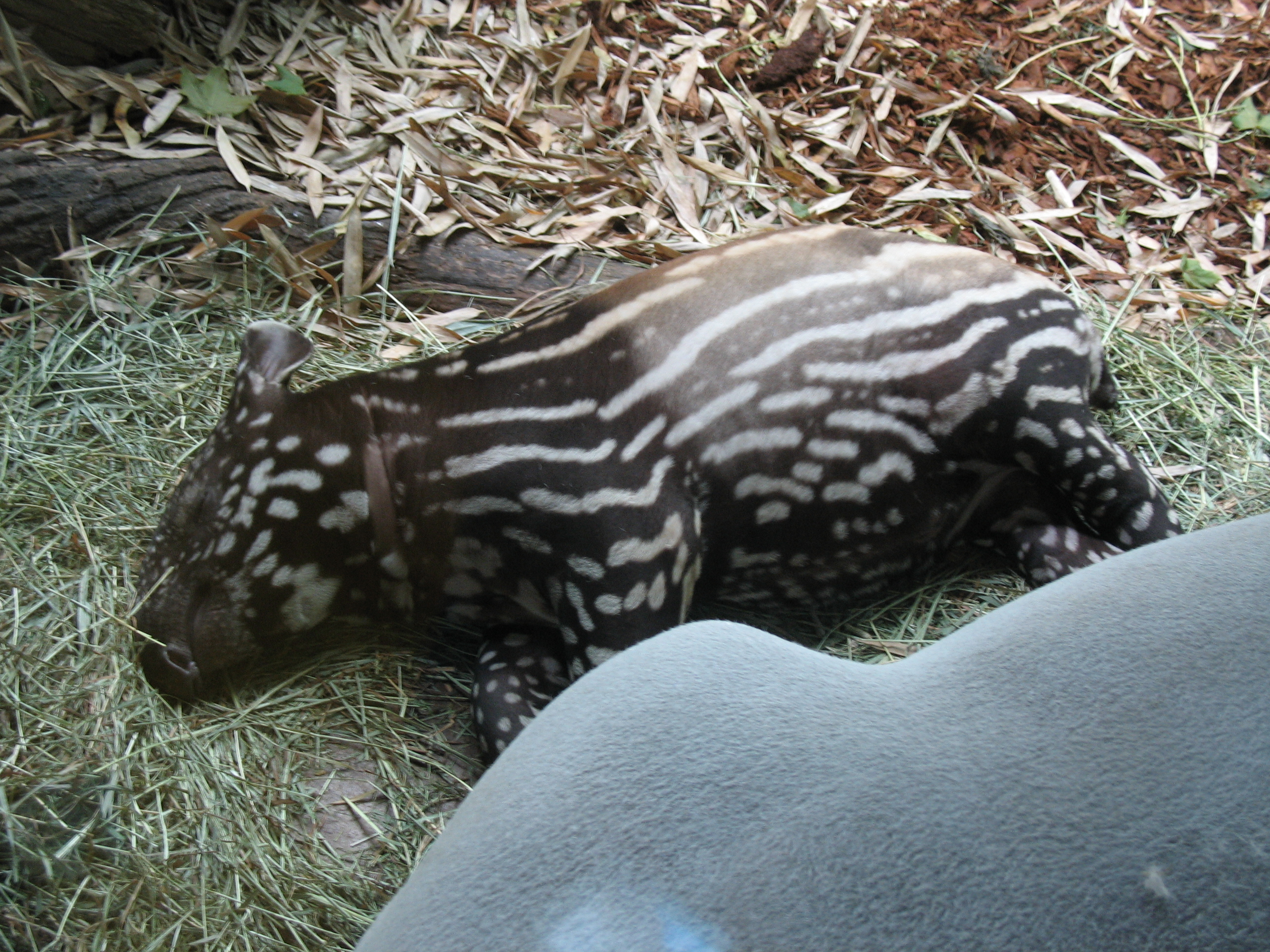
A juvenile Malayan tapir

The gestation period of the Malayan tapir is about 390–395 days, after which a single calf is born that weighs around 6.8 kg (15 lb). Malayan tapirs are the largest of the four tapir species at birth and tend to grow more quickly than their relatives. Young tapirs of all species have brown hair with white stripes and spots, a pattern that enables them to hide effectively in the dappled light of the forest. This baby coat fades into adult coloration between four and seven months after birth. Weaning occurs between six and eight months of age, at which time the babies are nearly full-grown, and the animals reach sexual maturity around age three. Breeding typically occurs in April, May or June, and females generally produce one calf every two years. Malayan tapirs can live up to 30 years, both in the wild and in captivity.

=== Predators ===
Because of its size, the Malayan tapir has few natural predators, and even reports of killings by tigers (Panthera tigris) are scarce. Malayan tapirs can defend themselves with their very powerful bite; in 1998, the bite of a captive female Malayan tapir severed a zookeeper's left arm at the mid-bicep, likely because she stood between her and her offspring.

== Threats ==
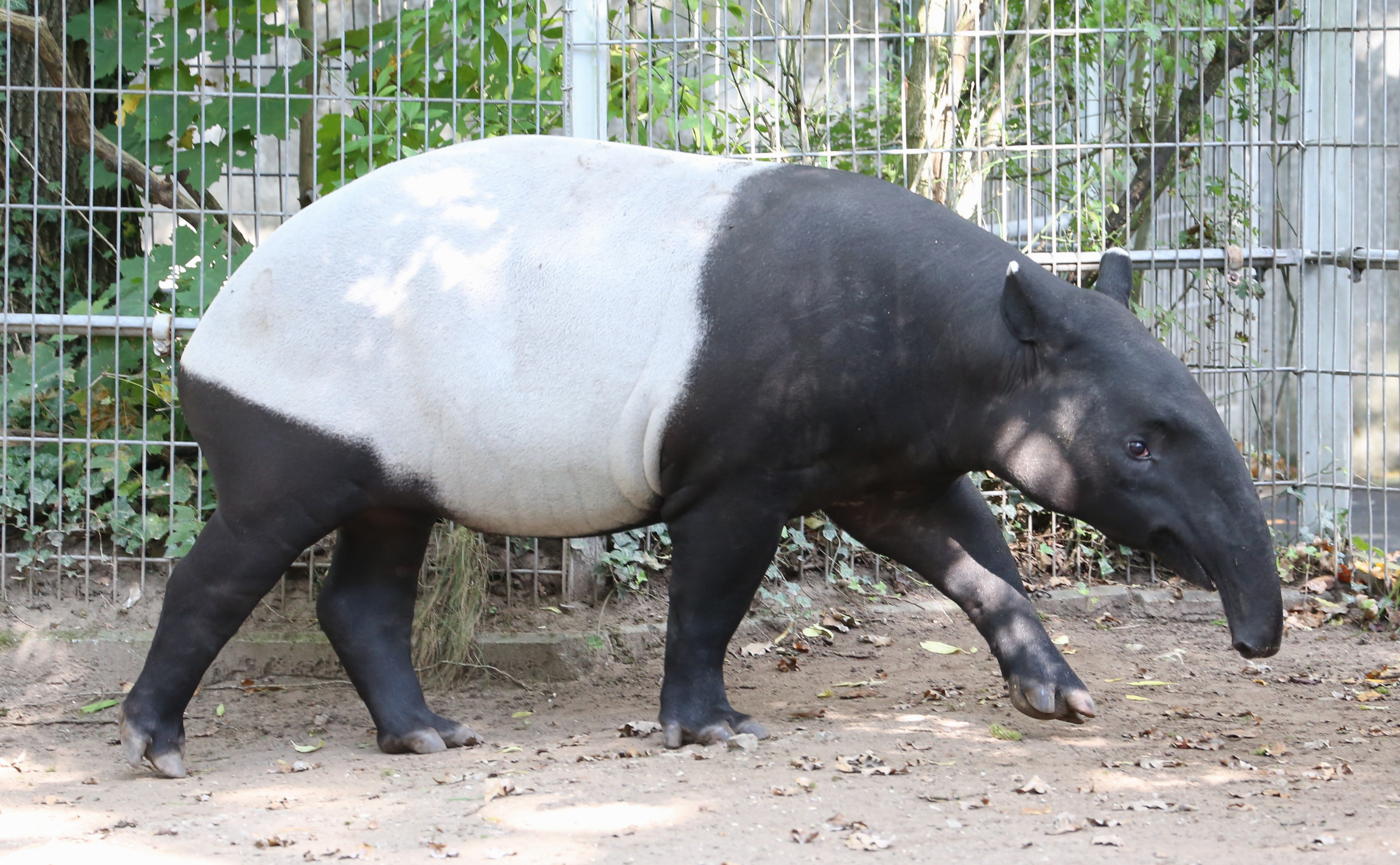
Individual at Nuremberg Zoo

The main threats to the Malayan tapir are loss and destruction of habitat through deforestation. Large tracts of forests in Thailand and Malaysia have been converted for planting oil palms. Habitat fragmentation in peninsular Malaysia caused displacement of 142 Malayan tapirs between 2006 and 2010; some were rescued and relocated, while 15 of them were killed in vehicle collisions.
