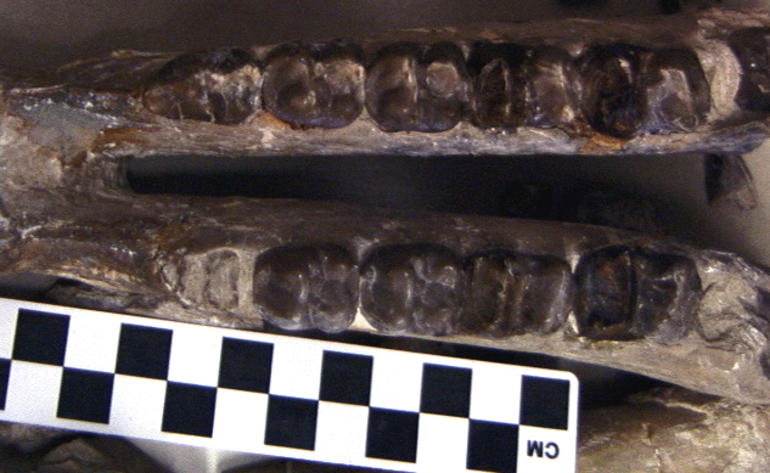
- Nexuotapirus robustus jawbone

Scientific classification
- Domain: Eukaryota
- Kingdom: Animalia
- Phylum: Chordata
- Class: Mammalia
- Order: Perissodactyla
- Family: Tapiridae
- Genus: †Nexuotapirus; Albright, 1998

Type species
- †Nexuotapirus marslandensis Schoch, 1984

Species
- N. marslandensis; N. robustus

= Nexuotapirus =

Nexuotapirus Temporal range: Late Oligocene - Early Miocene

Extinct genus of tapir

Nexuotapirus is an extinct genus of tapir from the Late Oligocene and Early Miocene of North America.

== Taxonomy ==
Nexuotapirus was erected in 1998. The type species, N. marslandensis, was originally classified under Miotapirus. The second species, N. robustus, was originally placed in Protapirus but was also moved to Nexuotapirus based on comparable lower dentition.

== Description ==
Nexuotapirus shows both plesiomorphic and derived features compared to other early tapirs, making its exact relationship with them difficult to place.

Primitive traits of the genus include less molar-like premolars and incisive foramina that extend posteriorly through the postcanine diastema, as well as a braincase that tapers towards the back. More advanced features include deep retraction of the nasal incision, nasal shortening, frontal shortening, and reduction of the supraorbital process, features comparable to the modern Tapirus.
