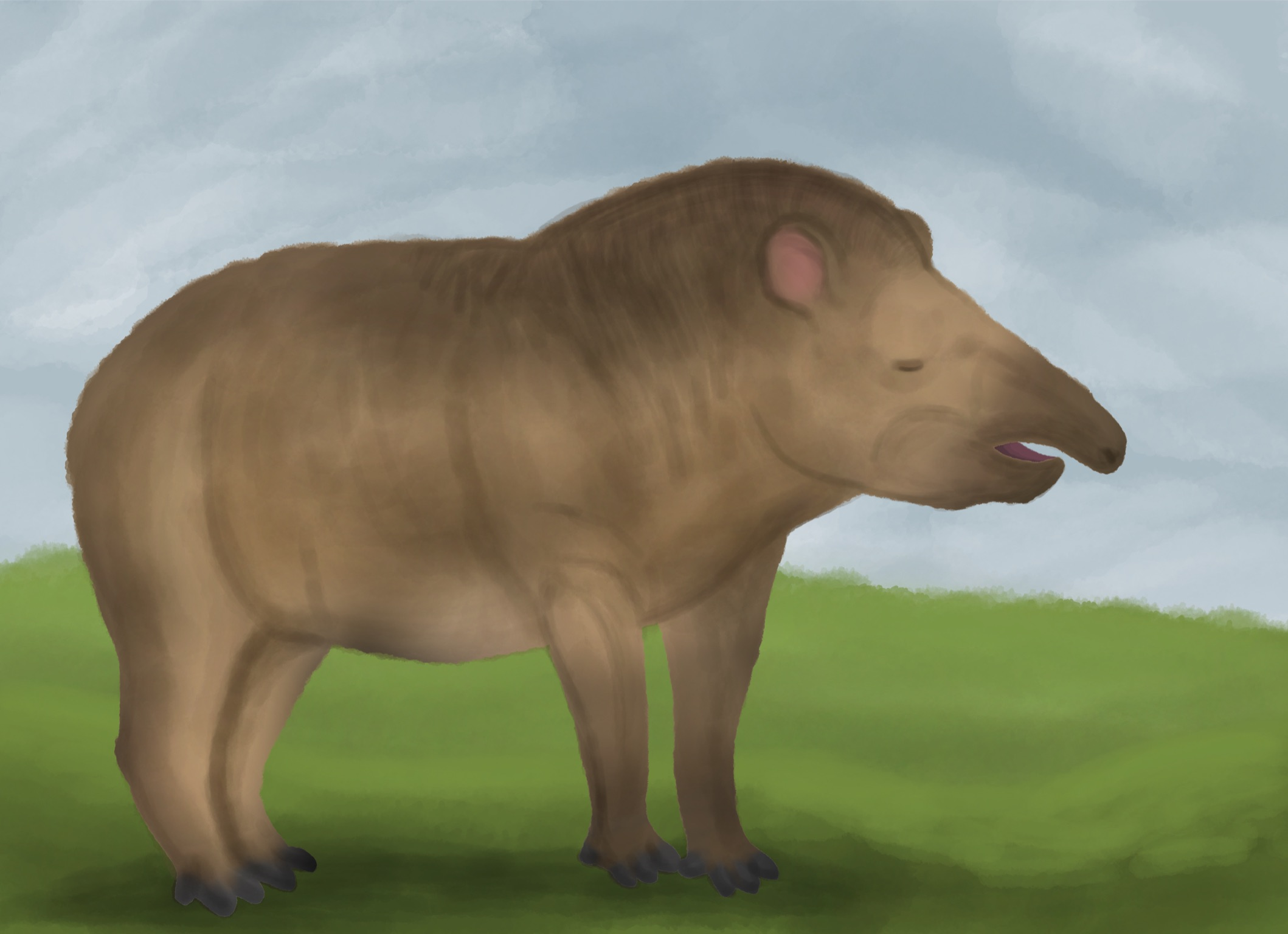
- Life reconstruction of T. californicus

Scientific classification
- Kingdom: Animalia
- Phylum: Chordata
- Class: Mammalia
- Order: Perissodactyla
- Family: Tapiridae
- Genus: Tapirus
- Species: †T. californicus

Binomial name
- †Tapirus californicus (Merriam, 1912)

Synonyms
- Tapirus haysii californicus

= Tapirus californicus =

Tapirus californicus Temporal range: middle–late Pleistocene

Extinct species of tapir

Tapirus californicus, the California tapir, is an extinct species of tapir that inhabited North America during the Pleistocene. It became extinct about 13,000 years ago.

Like other perissodactyls, tapirs originated in North America and lived on the North American continent for most of the Cenozoic Era. Fossils of ancient tapirs in North America can be dated back to 50 million-year-old Eocene rocks on Ellesmere Island, Canada, which was then a temperate climate. By 13 million years ago, tapirs very much like extant tapirs existed in Southern California.

During the Pleistocene epoch, there were at least four species of tapir on the North American continent. Along with Tapirus californicus, Tapirus merriami was found in California and Arizona, Tapirus veroensis was found in Florida, Georgia, Kansas, Missouri, and Tennessee, and Tapirus copei was found from Pennsylvania to Florida. By the end of the Pleistocene around 12,000 years ago, all tapirs disappeared from North America, which coincided with the extinctions of many other groups of megafauna in the Americas.

Tapirus californicus, like most extant tapirs, was believed to have been a largely solitary animal, and inhabited primarily the coastal regions of Southern California (although one specimen has been found in Oregon), preferring forested environments and possibly grasslands near rivers and lakes. Its maximum weight was about 225 kg (496 lb) and the estimated body length was 140 cm (4.6 ft), although no known complete fossil skeletal remains have been collected. Study of the skull shows T. californicus had shortened nasal bones to allow for attachment of strong muscles and ligaments to form a fleshy, prehensile snout like all extant tapirs. It was herbivorous, and its diet is believed to have consisted of shrubs, leaves, aquatic plants, fruits, and seeds. T. californicus was most likely prey to such predators as Smilodon, dire wolves, American lions and paleo-Indians.

A number of fossils of T. californicus have been collected at the La Brea Tar Pits in the modern urban center of Los Angeles. The cluster of tar pits have trapped and preserved many specimens of Pleistocene-era fauna.

== Taxonomy ==
There are multiple pieces of evidence which indicate most, if not all, of the 5 accepted Pleistocene tapir species found in North America (T. californicus, T. haysii (T. copei), T. lundeliusi, T. merriami, T. veroensis) may actually belong to the same species. T. californicus was considered to be a subspecies of T. haysii by Merriam, T. californicus and T. veroensis are nearly impossible to distinguish morphologically and occupy the same time frame, being separated only by location, and T. haysii, T. veroensis, and T. lundeliusi are already considered so closely related that they occupy the same subgenus (Helicotapirus). Additionally, few details distinguish T. haysii and T. veroensis except size, date, and wear of teeth; and the intermediate sizes overlap greatly with many specimens originally assigned to one species, then later switched over to another.
