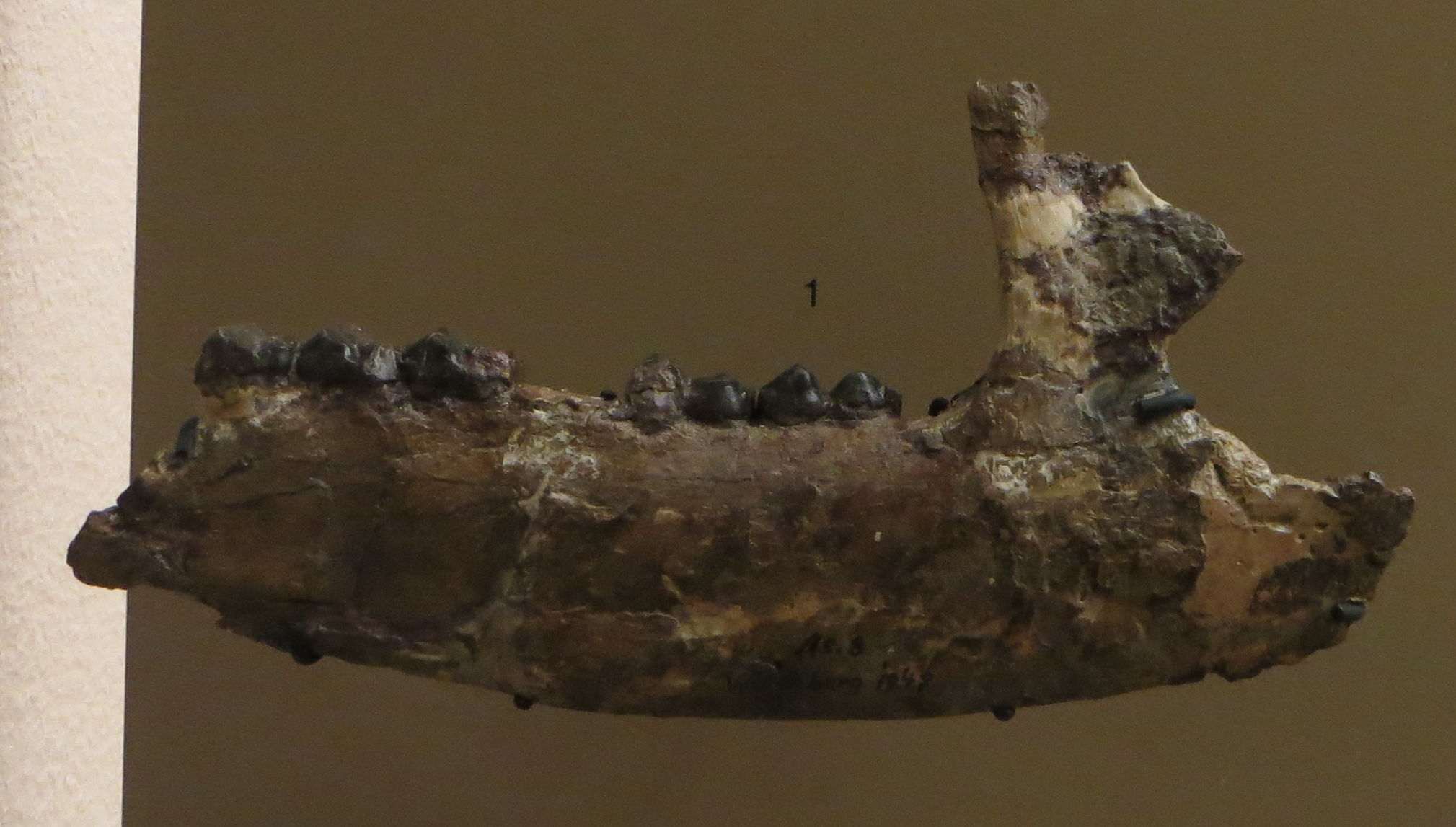
- Paratapirus intermedius mandible

Scientific classification
- Kingdom: Animalia
- Phylum: Chordata
- Class: Mammalia
- Order: Perissodactyla
- Family: Tapiridae
- Genus: †Paratapirus; Depéret & Douxami, 1902

Type species
- †Paratapirus helveticus Meyer, 1867

Species
- P. helveticus; P. intermedius

= Paratapirus =

Paratapirus Temporal range: Late Oligocene - Early Miocene

Extinct genus of tapir

Paratapirus is an extinct genus of tapir known from the Late Oligocene and Early Miocene of Europe.

== Taxonomy ==
Two species are considered valid:

- P. helveticus
- P. intermedius

The species P. moguntiacus and P. robustus are considered synonyms of P. intermedius. Members of this genus were originally described under the name Palaeotapirus along with several other tapir genera, but that name is now considered abandoned since it was described from poor diagnostic material.

== Description ==
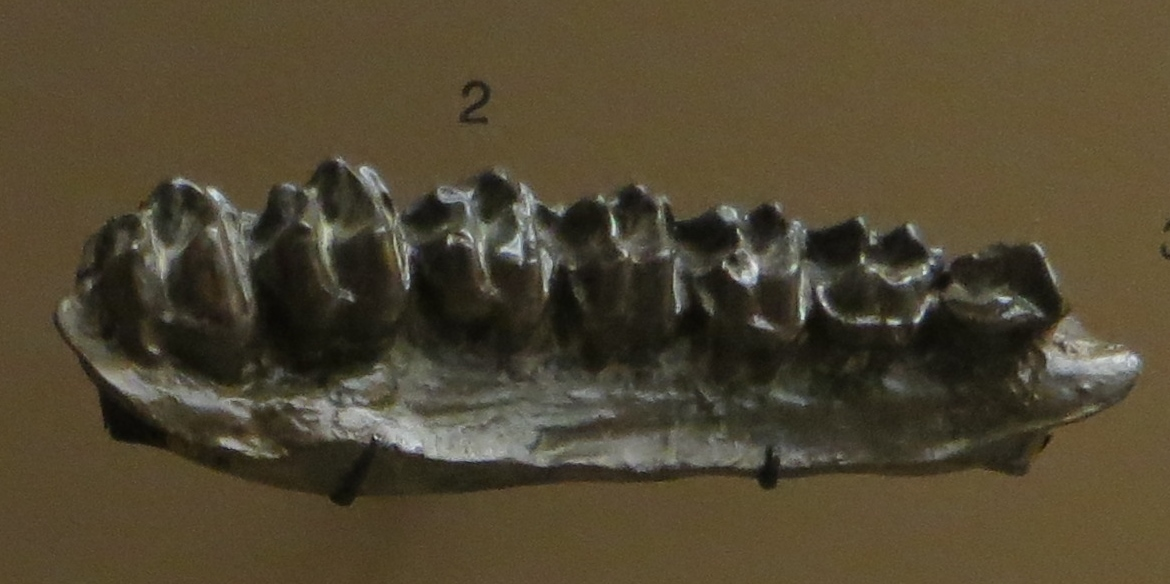
Fossil of P. helveticus

Paratapirus was among the earliest known tapirs, and probably evolved from Protapirus which had migrated into Eurasia from North America near the end of the Oligocene.

In comparison to Protapirus it had more derived dentition, such as molar-like premolars.
