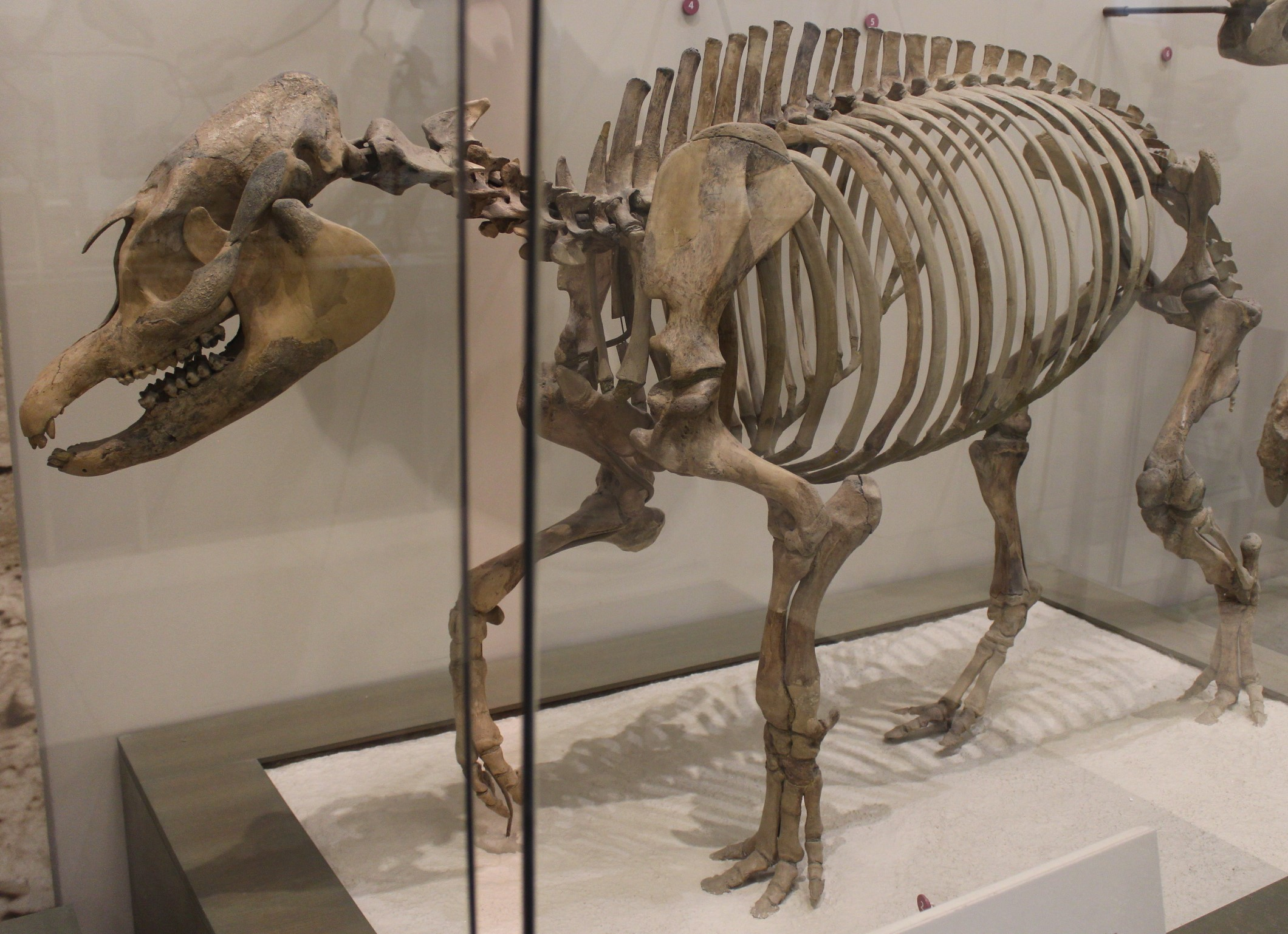
- Skeletal mount, American Museum of Natural History

Scientific classification
- Kingdom: Animalia
- Phylum: Chordata
- Class: Mammalia
- Order: Perissodactyla
- Family: Tapiridae
- Genus: Tapirus
- Species: †T. veroensis

Binomial name
- †Tapirus veroensis Sellards, 1918
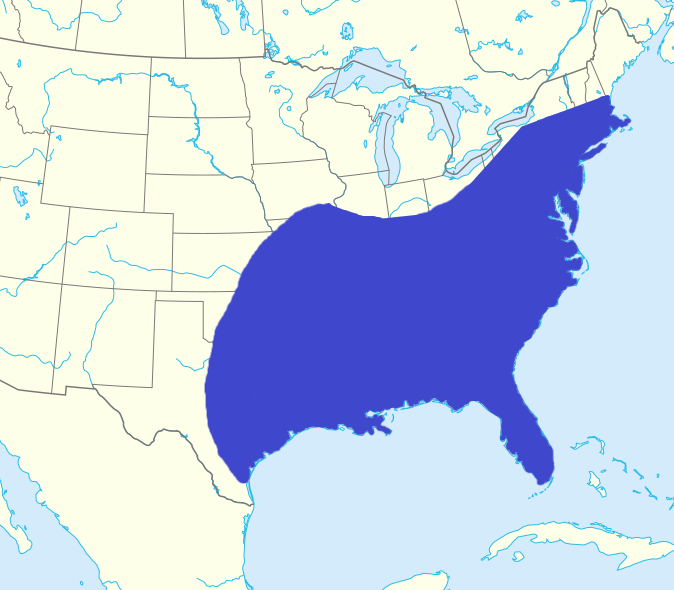

= Tapirus veroensis =

Tapirus veroensis Temporal range: Pleistocene

Extinct species of mammal

Tapirus veroensis, commonly called the vero tapir, is an extinct tapir species that lived in the area of the modern Eastern and Southern United States during the Pleistocene epoch (Irvingtonian-Rancholabrean). Tapirus veroensis is thought to have gone extinct around 11,000 years ago as part of the end-Pleistocene extinction event.

== History ==
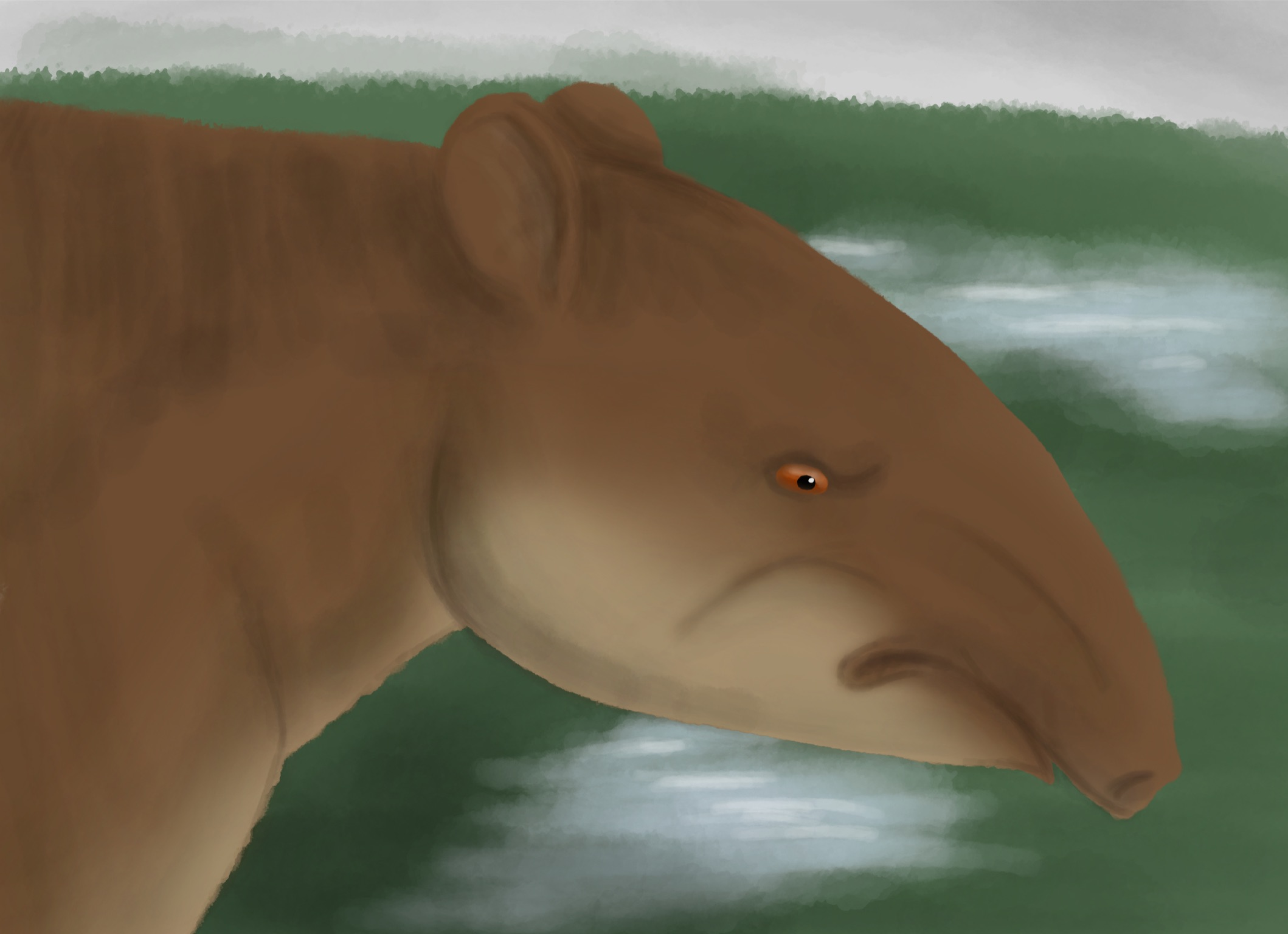
Life reconstruction

The first complete skull with full dentition of T. veroensis fossil was found at Vero Beach, Florida, in 1915 and named in 1918 by the Florida State Geologist E. H. Sellards. Fragmentary specimens had been described by Leidy as early as 1852.

=== Taxonomy ===
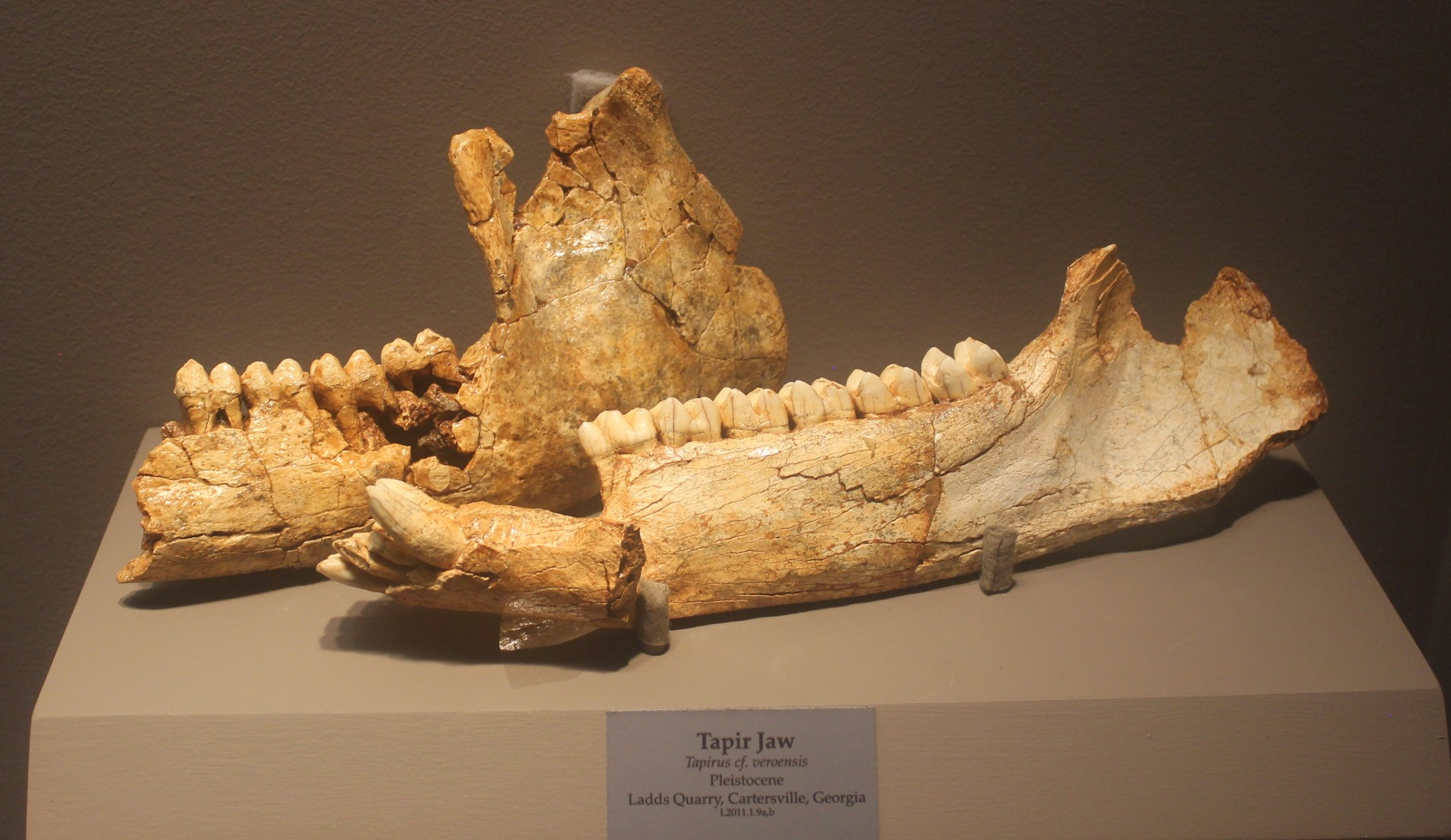
T. veroensis jaws, Tellus Science Museum

The taxonomy of Pleistocene North American tapirs has long been the subject of confusion, with many named species now recognised as synonyms of T. veroensis. Tapirus veroensis is the type species of the subgenus Helicotapirus, which includes several other species of extinct tapir from North America like T. lundeliusi and T. haysii. These tapirs are thought to be more closely related to living South American tapirs than to the Malayan tapir. T. veroensis was coeval with T. merriami and T. californicus, native to Western North America, but their poor preservation makes their relationships to other tapirs uncertain.

== Distribution ==
Tapirus veroensis inhabited the Southern and Eastern United States, ranging as far west as Texas and as far north as Illinois and New York, with a large number of finds being known from Florida.

== Physical characteristics ==
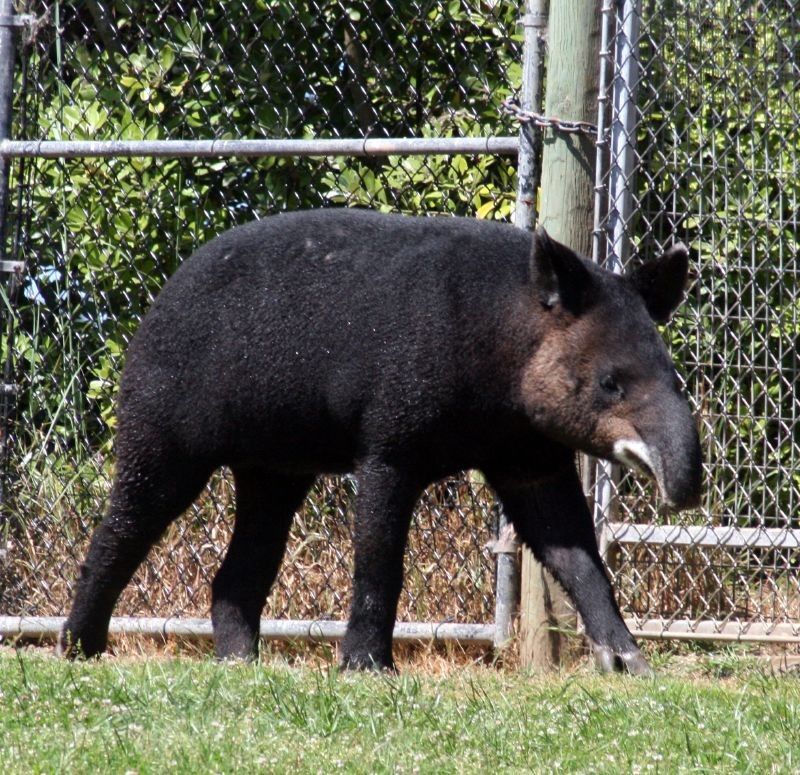
Tapirus veroensis was adapted to living in cold environments like the living mountain tapir (pictured)

Diagram of skull in side-on view

Tapirus veroensis is thought to have been more tolerant of cold environments than most living tapirs, similar to the living mountain tapir (Tapirus pinchaque). It was mid-sized for a tapir, comparable in size to Baird's tapir or the South American tapir, with an estimated body weight of approximately 230 kilograms (510 lb). The sagittal crest was low in comparison to some other tapir species. It has been estimated to have had a relatively high bite force, and was probably capable of consuming a wide variety of vegetation.

== Palaeobiology ==
=== Palaeoecology ===
T. veroensis has been found in Jones Springs (Missouri) deposits in association with deciduous trees and American alligators. The age of the deposits are older than 40,000-60,000 years old, during a relatively warmer yet still temperate interglacial period. The climate would have been analogous to central and southern Arkansas. Specimens from Crankshaft Pit, Missouri, in contrast were found in association with cold adapted animals like Arctic shrews, Northern bog lemmings, snowshoe hares, southern red-backed voles, etc. As a result, T. veroensis appears to have been able to tolerate a broad range of temperatures.

^{87}Sr/^{86}Sr values from Floridian T. veroensis indicate that their lifetime movements were restricted to Florida, suggesting that individuals of the species did not migrate long distances.

T. veroensis may have been a seed disperser of certain anachronistic North American species with megafaunal dispersal syndrome, including the pawpaw.
