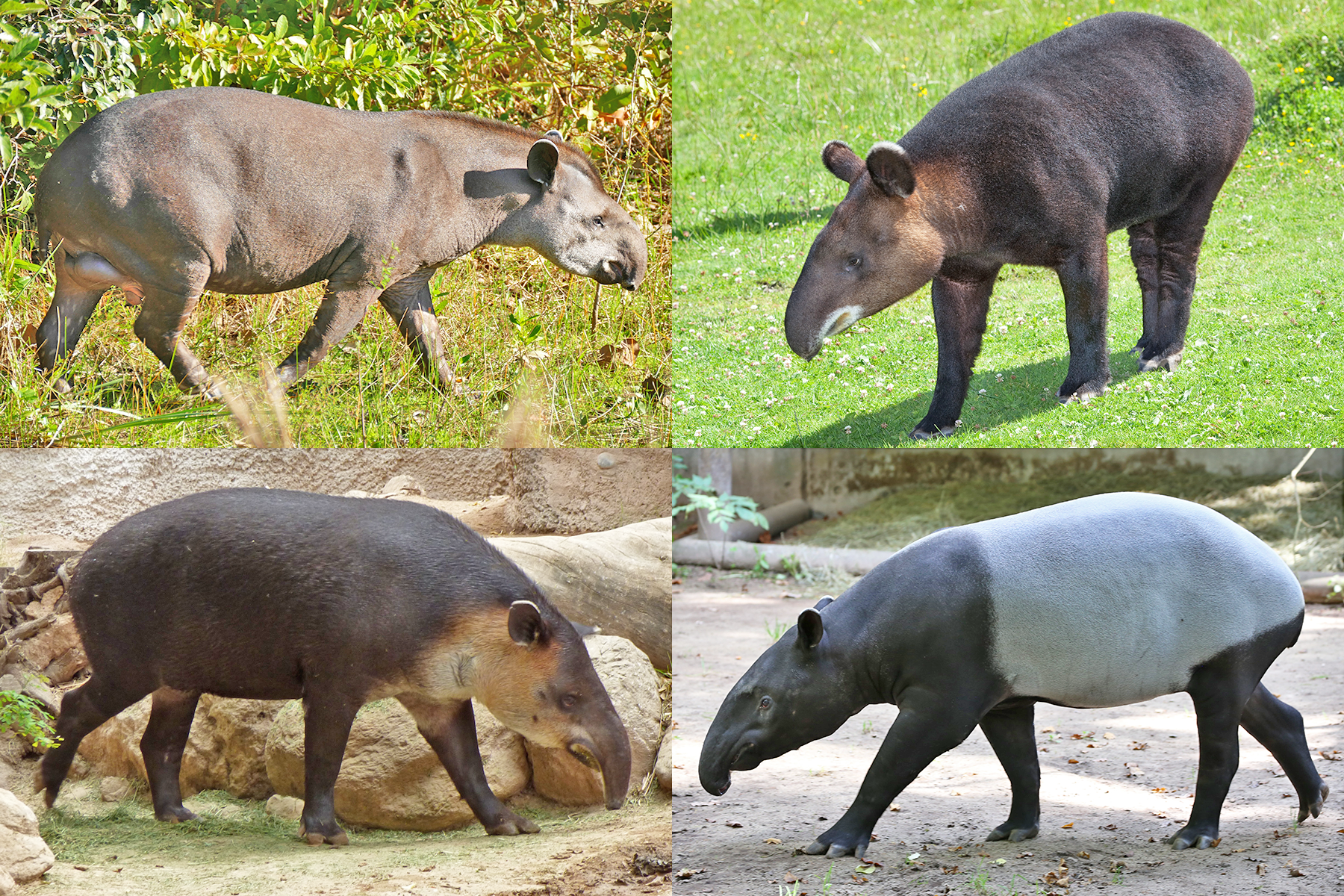
- Tapir species, from top left clockwise: South American tapir (Tapirus terrestris), mountain tapir (Tapirus pinchaque), Malayan tapir (Tapirus indicus) and Baird's tapir (Tapirus bairdii)

Scientific classification
- Kingdom: Animalia
- Phylum: Chordata
- Class: Mammalia
- Order: Perissodactyla
- Clade: Tapiromorpha
- Suborder: Ceratomorpha
- Superfamily: Tapiroidea
- Family: Tapiridae; Gray, 1821

Type genus
- Tapirus Brisson, 1762

Genera
- †Eotapirus; †Hesperaletes; †Miotapirus; †Nexuotapirus; †Paratapirus; †Plesiocolopirus; †Plesiotapirus; †Protapirus; †Selenolophodon; †Tapiravus; †Tapiriscus; Tapirus
- Distribution of extant species

Synonyms
- Elasmognathinae Gray, 1867

= Tapir =

Tapir Temporal range: 33.9–0 Ma Early Oligocene – Recent

Herbivorous mammal

Tapirs (/ˈteɪpər/ TAY-pər) are large herbivorous mammals belonging to the family Tapiridae. They are similar in shape to a pig, with a short, prehensile nose trunk (proboscis). Tapirs inhabit jungle and forest regions of South and Central America and Southeast Asia. They are one of three extant branches of Perissodactyla (odd-toed ungulates), alongside equines and rhinoceroses. Only a single genus, Tapirus, is extant. Tapirs migrated into South America from North America during the Pleistocene epoch after the formation of the Isthmus of Panama as part of the Great American Interchange. Tapirs were present across North America, but became extinct in the region at the end of the Late Pleistocene, around 12,000 years ago.

== Etymology ==
The term tapir comes from the Portuguese-language words tapir, tapira and Old Tupi tapi'ira, and roughly translates to thick, due to the thickness of its hide.

== Species ==
There are four widely recognized extant species of tapir, all in the genus Tapirus of the family Tapiridae. They are the South American tapir, the Malayan tapir, Baird's tapir, and the mountain tapir. In 2013, a group of researchers said they had identified a fifth species of tapir, the kabomani tapir. However, the existence of the kabomani tapir as a distinct species has been widely disputed, and recent genetic evidence further suggests that it actually is part of the species South American tapir.

=== Extant species ===
Photo	Common name	Scientific name	Distribution
	Baird's tapir (also called the Central American tapir)	Tapirus bairdii (Gill, 1865)	Mexico, Central America and northwestern South America
	South American tapir (also called the Brazilian tapir or lowland tapir)	Tapirus terrestris (Linnaeus, 1758)	Venezuela, Colombia, and the Guianas in the north to Brazil, Argentina, and Paraguay in the south, to Bolivia, Peru, and Ecuador in the West.
	Mountain tapir (also called the woolly tapir)	Tapirus pinchaque (Roulin, 1829)	Eastern and Central Cordilleras mountains in Colombia, Ecuador, and the far north of Peru.
	Malayan tapir (also called the Asian tapir, Oriental tapir or Indian tapir)	Tapirus indicus (Desmarest, 1819)	Indonesia, Malaysia, Myanmar, and Thailand

The four species are all classified on the IUCN Red List as either Endangered or Vulnerable. The tapirs have a number of extinct relatives in the superfamily Tapiroidea. The closest extant relatives of the tapirs are the other odd-toed ungulates, which include horses, wild asses, zebras and rhinoceroses.

=== Extinct species ===
During the Late Pleistocene, several other species inhabited North America, including Tapirus veroensis, native to the southern and eastern United States (with its northernmost records being New York State), and Tapirus merriami and Tapirus californicus, native to Western North America. These became extinct during the Quaternary extinction event around 12,000 years ago, along with most of the other large mammals of the Americas, co-inciding with the first arrival of humans to the continent. Tapirus augustus (formerly placed in Megatapirus), native to Southeast and East Asia, substantially larger than the Malayan tapir, also became extinct at some point during the Late Pleistocene. Many primitive tapirs were originally classified under Palaeotapirus including members of Paratapirus and Plesiotapirus, but the original diagnostic material of the genus was too poor to characterize, leading to included species being moved to new genera.

Image	Species
	Eotapirus; E. broennimanni; E. ruber
M. harrisonensis	Miotapirus; M. harrisonensis
N. robustus	Nexuotapirus; N. marslandensis; N. robustus
P. intermedius	Paratapirus; P. helveticus; P. intermedius
P. yagii	Plesiotapirus; P. yagii
P. simplex	Protapirus; P. aginensis; P. bavaricus; P. cetinensis; P. douvillei; P. gromovae; P. obliquidens; P. priscus; P. simplex
	Tapiravus; T. rarus; T. validus
Giant tapir (T. augustus) Cope's tapir (T. haysii) T. veroensis	Tapirus; T. arvernensis Croizet & Jobert, 1828; T. augustus Matthew & Granger, 1923 - Formerly Megatapirus; T. californicus Merriam, 1912; T. cristatellus Winge, 1906; T. greslebini Rusconi, 1934; T. haysii Simpson, 1945; T. johnsoni Schultz et al., 1975; T. lundeliusi Hulbert, 2010; T. merriami Frick, 1921; T. mesopotamicus Ferrero & Noriega, 2007; T. oliverasi Ubilla, 1983 - Invalid; T. polkensis Olsen, 1860; T. rioplatensis Cattoi, 1957; T. rondoniensis Holanda et al., 2011; T. sanyuanensis Huang & Fang, 1991; T. simpsoni Schultz et al., 1975; T. sinensis Owen, 1870; T. tarijensis Ameghino, 1902; T. veroensis Sellards, 1918; T. webbi Hulbert, 2005

== General appearance ==
(video) A tapir at Ueno Zoo

Size varies between types, but most tapirs are about 2 m (6 1/2 ft) long, stand about 1 m (3 1/4 ft) high at the shoulder, and weigh between 150 and 300 kg (330 and 660 lb). Their coats are short and range in colour from reddish brown, to grey, to nearly black, with the notable exceptions of the Malayan tapir, which has a white, saddle-shaped marking on its back, and the mountain tapir, which has longer, woolly fur. All tapirs have oval, white-tipped ears, rounded, protruding rumps with stubby tails, and splayed, hooved toes, with four toes on the front feet and three on the hind feet, which help them to walk on muddy and soft ground. Baby tapirs of all types have striped-and-spotted coats for camouflage.

Females have a single pair of mammary glands, and males have long penises relative to their body size.

== Physical characteristics ==
Tapirs have brown eyes, often with a bluish cast to them, which has been identified as corneal cloudiness, a condition most commonly found in Malayan tapirs. The exact etiology is unknown, but the cloudiness may be caused by excessive exposure to light or by trauma. However, the tapir's sensitive ears and strong sense of smell help to compensate for deficiencies in vision.

Tapirs have simple stomachs and are hindgut fermenters that ferment digested food in a large cecum.

=== Proboscis ===
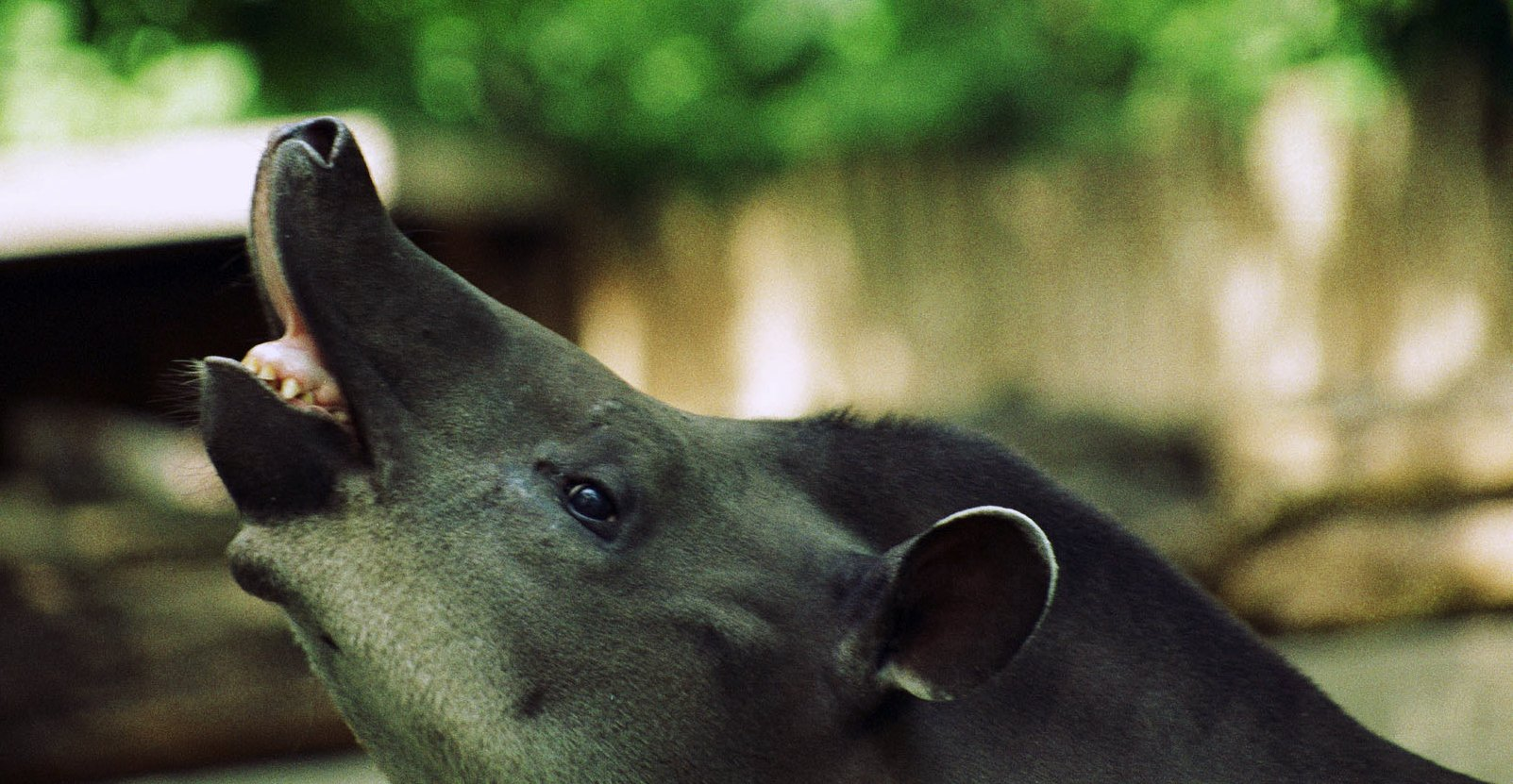
Tapir showing the flehmen response

The proboscis of the tapir is a highly flexible organ, able to move in all directions, allowing the animals to grab foliage that would otherwise be out of reach. Tapirs often exhibit the flehmen response, a posture in which they raise their snouts and show their teeth to detect scents. This response is frequently exhibited by bulls sniffing for signs of other males or females in oestrus in the area. The length of the proboscis varies among species; Malayan tapirs have the longest snouts and Brazilian tapirs have the shortest. The evolution of tapir probosces, made up almost entirely of soft tissues rather than bony internal structures, gives the Tapiridae skull a unique form in comparison to other perissodactyls, with a larger sagittal crest, orbits positioned more rostrally, a posteriorly telescoped cranium, and a more elongated and retracted nasoincisive incisure.

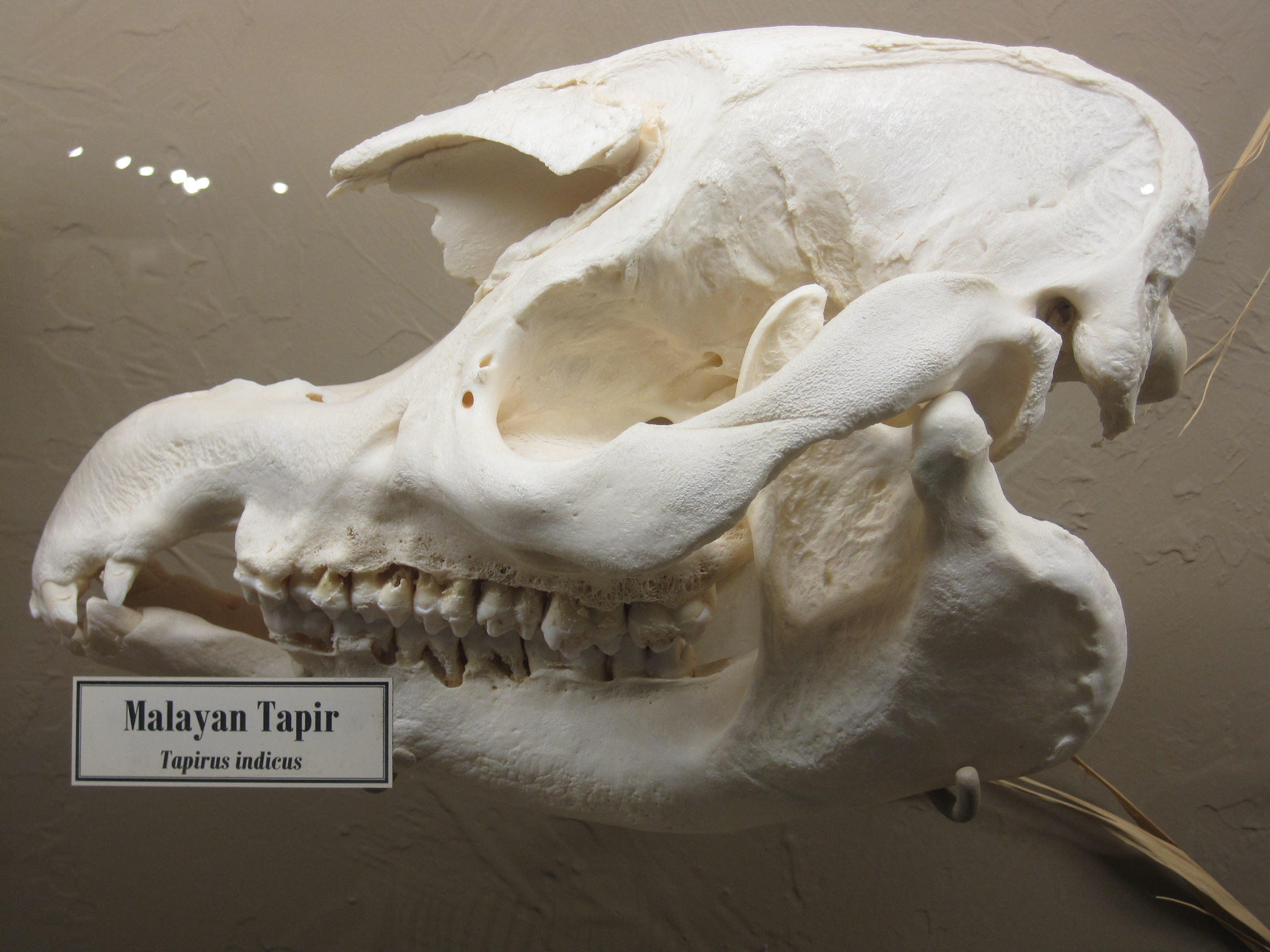
Malayan tapir skull

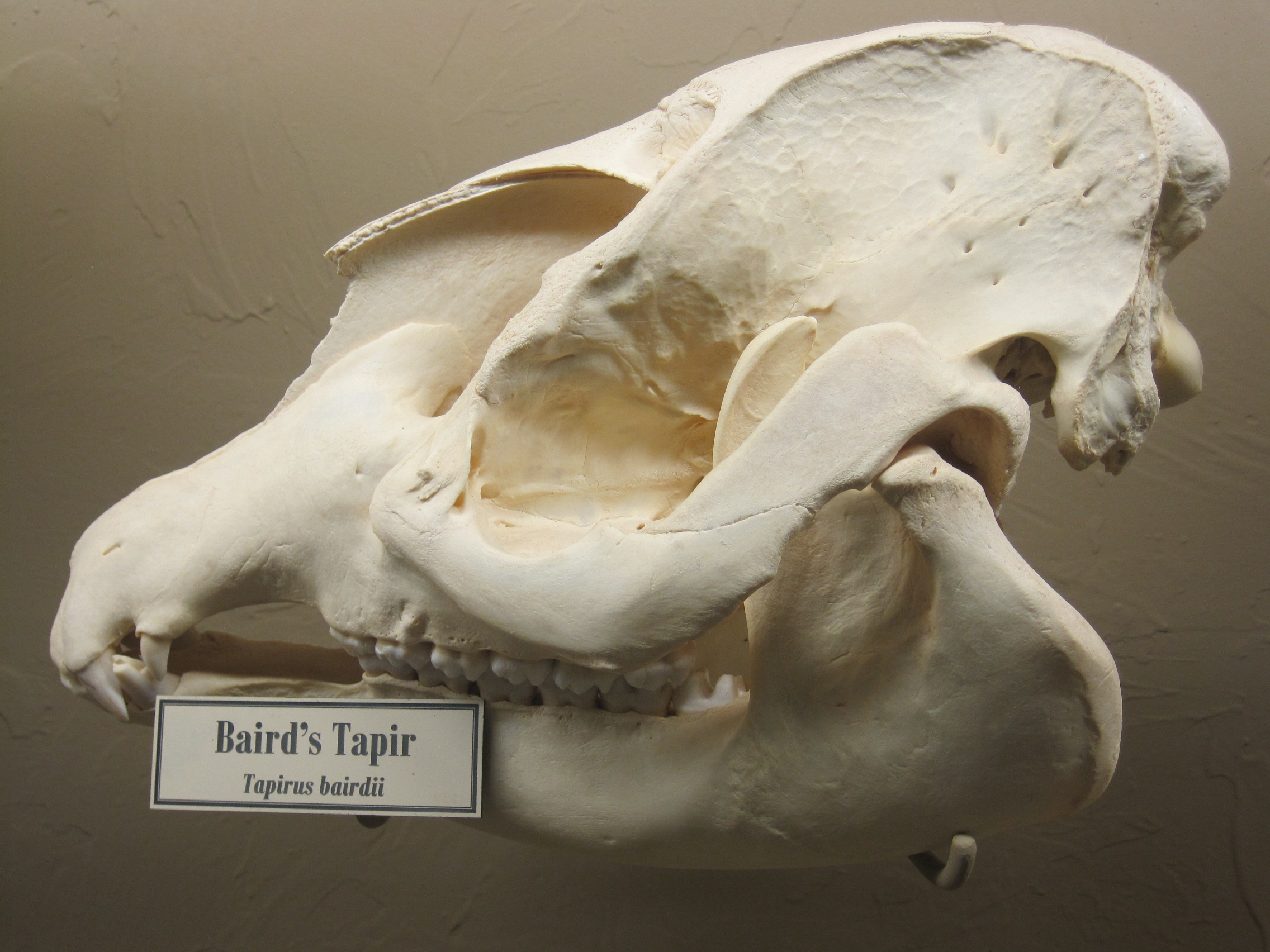
Baird's tapir skull

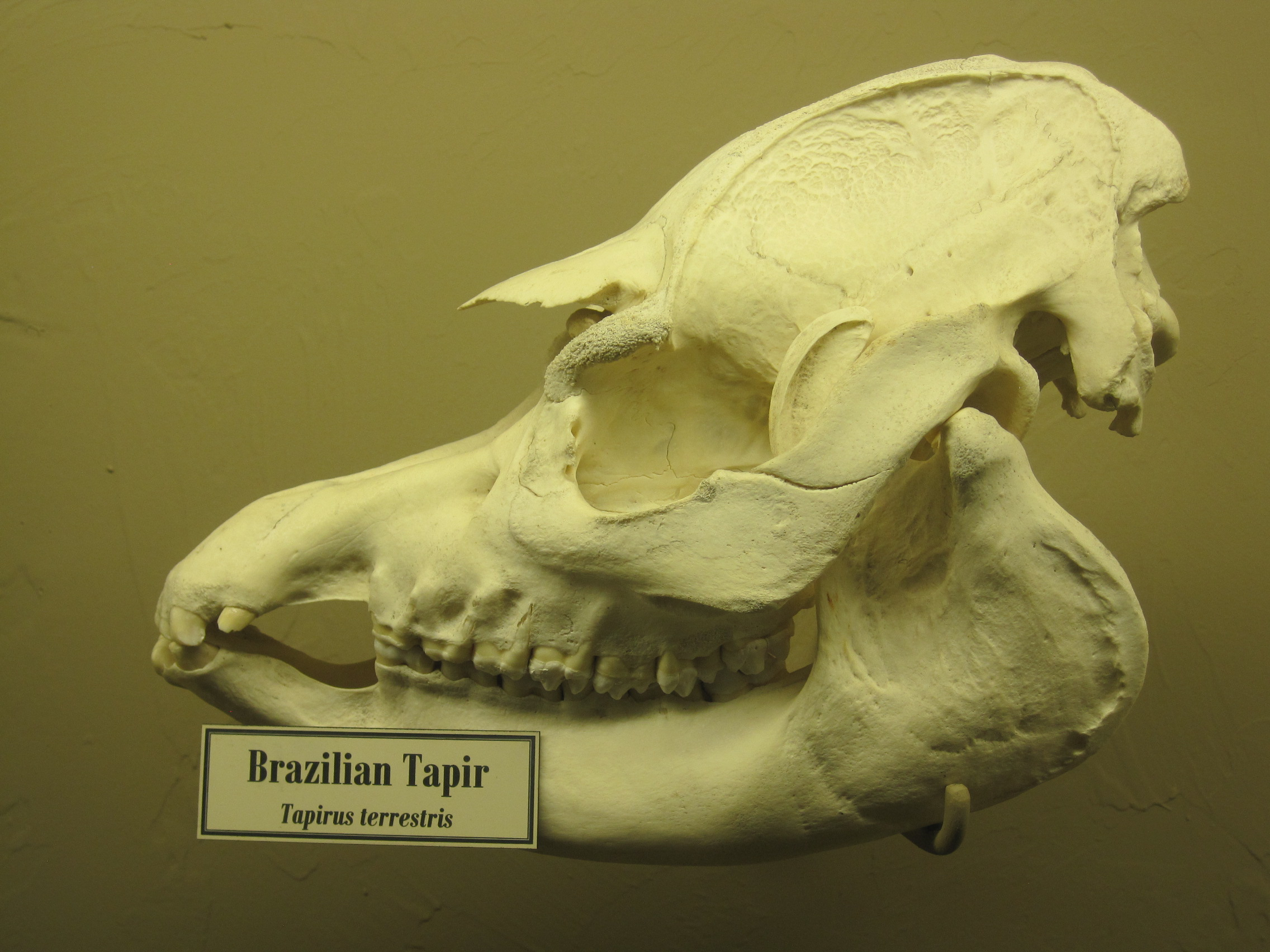
South American tapir skull

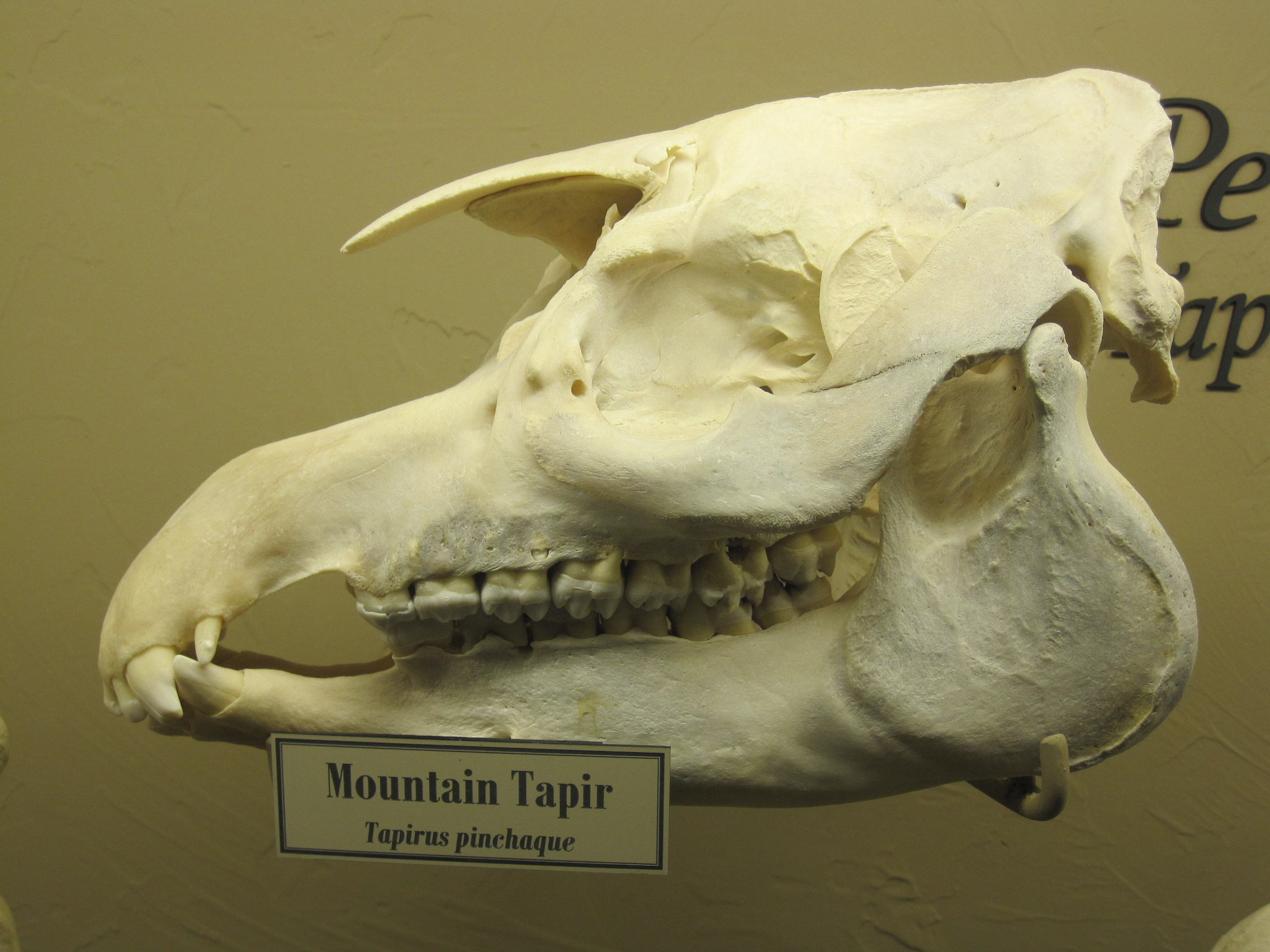
Mountain tapir skull

=== Dentition ===
Tapirs have brachyodont, or low-crowned teeth, that lack cementum. Their dental formula is:

Dentition
3.1.4.3
3.1.3–4.3

Totaling 42 to 44 teeth, this dentition is closer to that of equids, which may differ by one less canine, than their other perissodactyl relatives, rhinoceroses. Their incisors are chisel-shaped, with the third large, conical upper incisor separated by a short gap from the considerably smaller canine. A much longer gap is found between the canines and premolars, the first of which may be absent. Tapirs are lophodonts, and their cheek teeth have distinct lophs (ridges) between protocones, paracones, metacones and hypocones.

== Life cycle ==
Young tapirs reach sexual maturity between three and five years of age, with females maturing earlier than males. Under good conditions, a healthy female tapir can reproduce every two years; a single young, called a calf, is born after a gestation of about 13 months. The natural lifespan of a tapir is about 25 to 30 years, both in the wild and in zoos. Apart from mothers and their young offspring, tapirs lead almost exclusively solitary lives.

== Behaviour ==
Although they frequently live in dryland forests, tapirs with access to rivers spend a good deal of time in and under water, feeding on soft vegetation, taking refuge from predators, and cooling off during hot periods. Tapirs near a water source will swim, sink to the bottom, and walk along the riverbed to feed, and have been known to submerge themselves to allow small fish to pick parasites off their bulky bodies. Along with freshwater lounging, tapirs often wallow in mud pits, which helps to keep them cool and free of insects.

In the wild, the tapir's diet consists of fruit, berries, and leaves, particularly young, tender vegetation. Tapirs will spend many of their waking hours foraging along well-worn trails, snouts to the ground in search of food. Baird's tapirs have been observed to eat around 40 kg (85 lb) of vegetation in one day.

Tapirs are largely nocturnal and crepuscular, although the smaller mountain tapir of the Andes is generally more active during the day than its congeners. They have monocular vision.

Copulation may occur in or out of water. In captivity, mating pairs will often copulate several times during oestrus. Intromission lasts between 10 and 20 minutes.

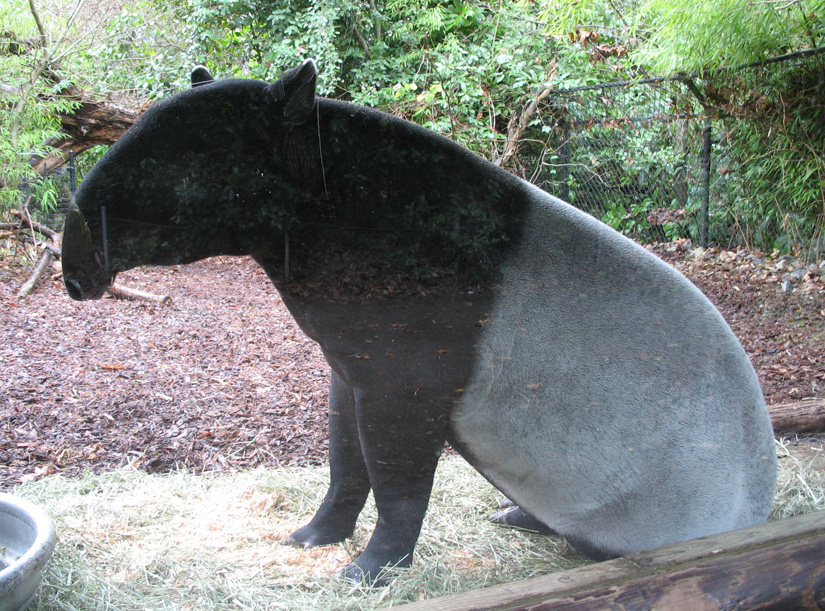
An adult Malayan tapir sitting

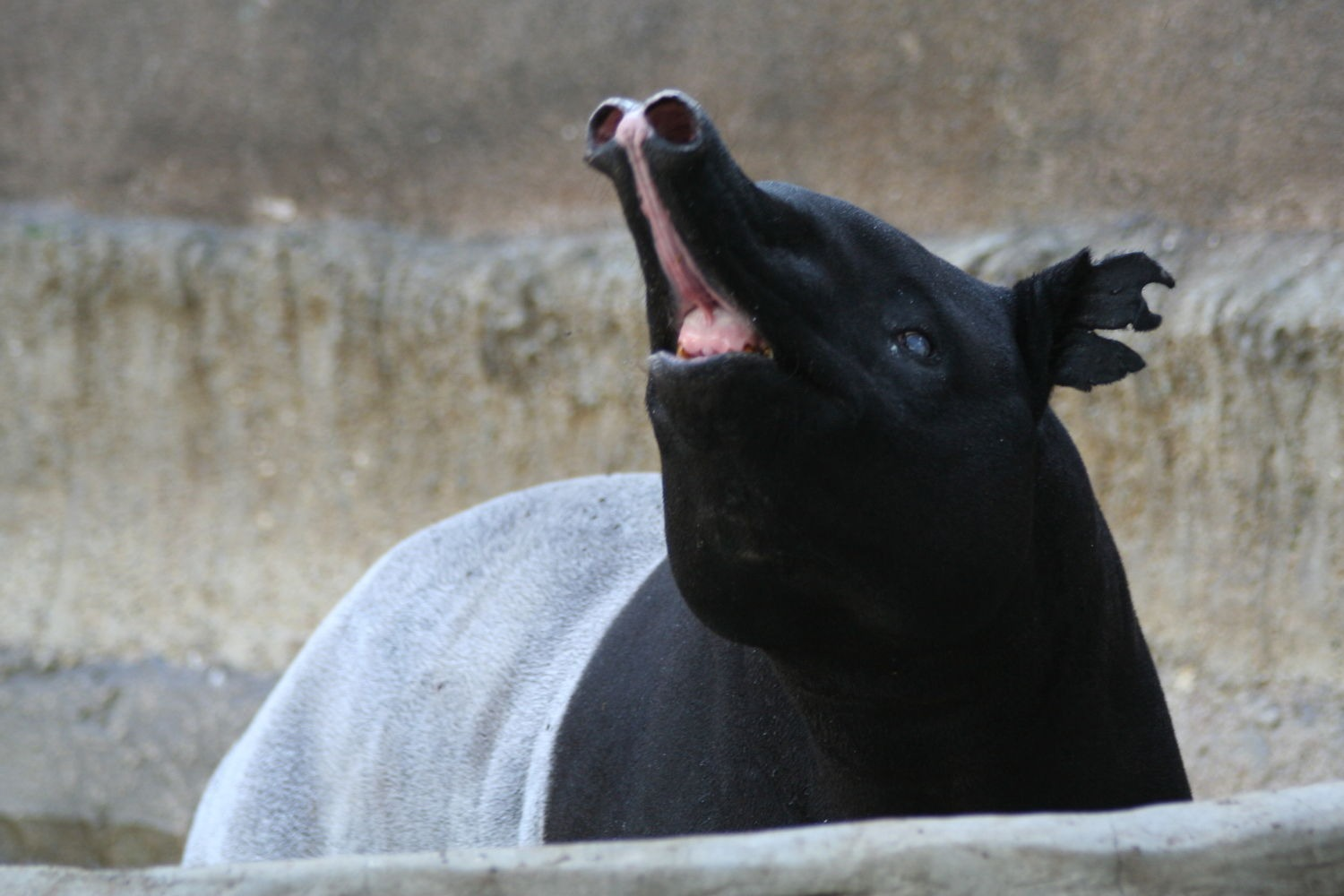
Adult Malayan tapir exhibiting the flehmen response

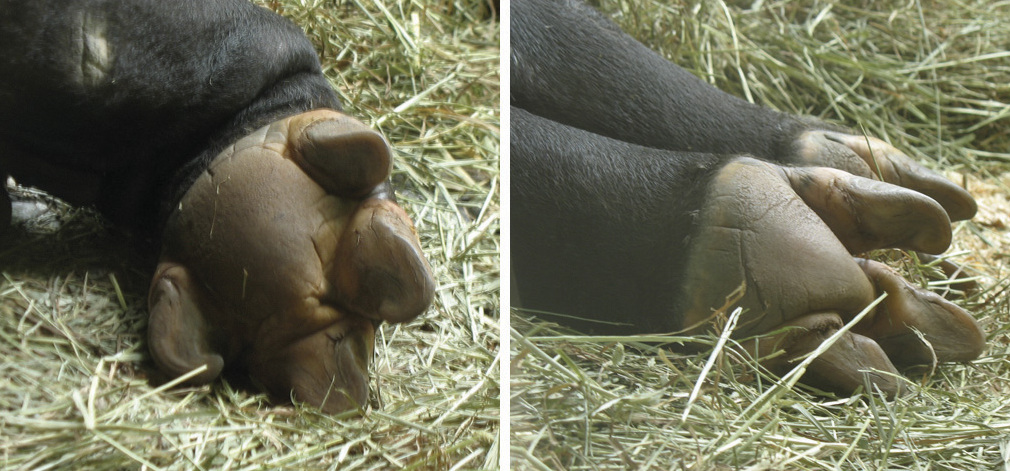
The undersides of the front feet (left, with four toes) and back feet (right, with three toes) of a Malayan tapir at rest

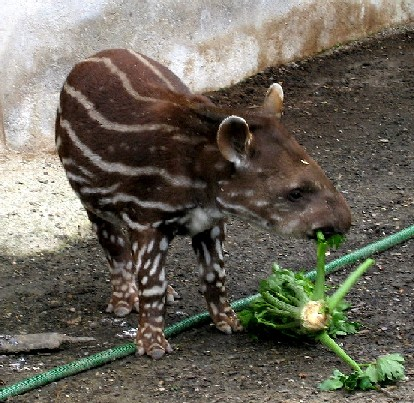
A baby South American tapir, with spots and stripes characteristic of all juvenile tapirs

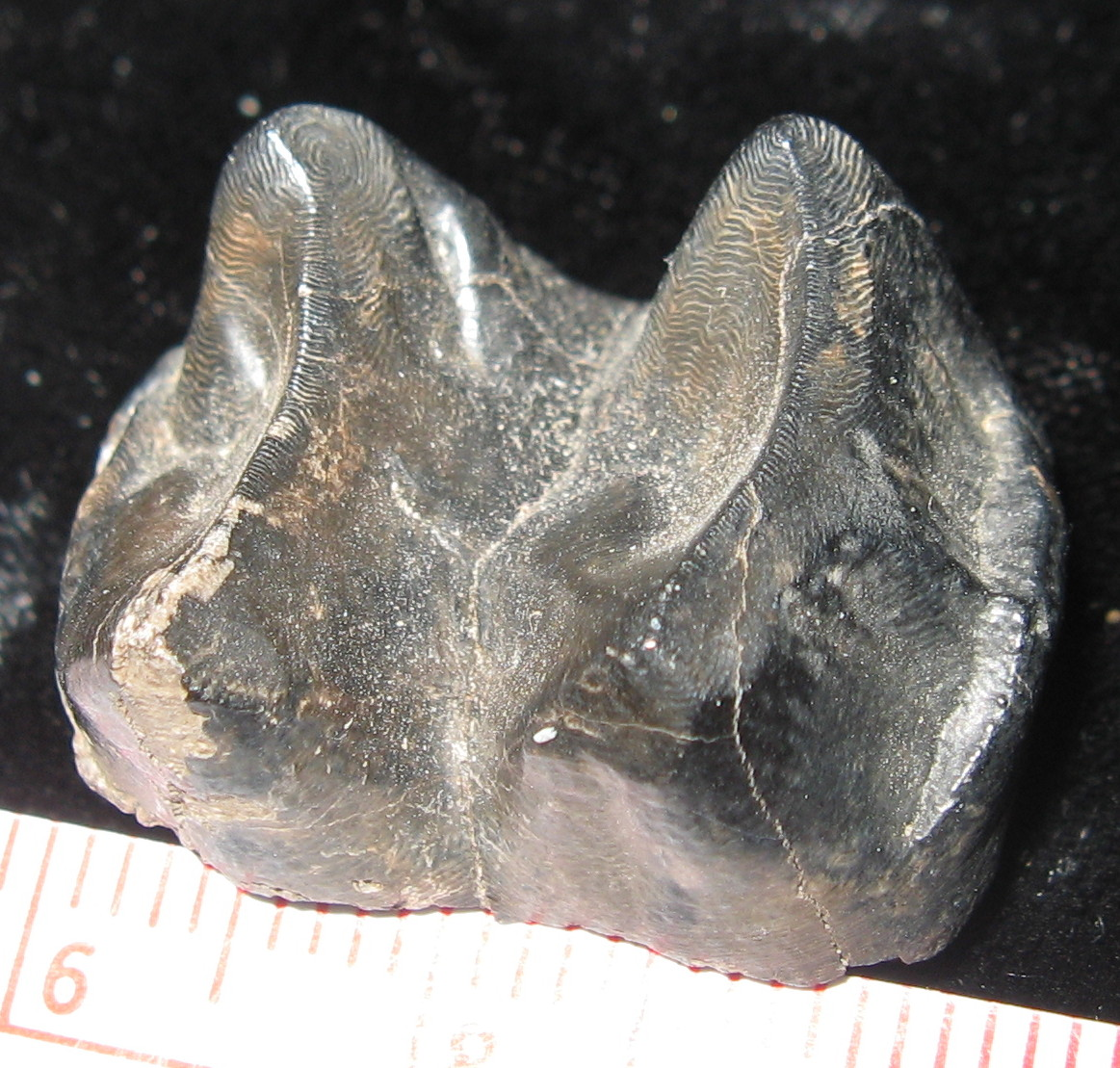
Tooth from the extinct Tapirus veroensis, 2.5 cm (1 in) wide, about 1 million years old, alluvial deposits, Florida, US

== Habitat, predation, and vulnerability ==
Adult tapirs are large enough to have few natural predators, and the thick skin on the backs of their necks helps to protect them from threats such as jaguars, crocodiles, anacondas, and tigers. The creatures are also able to run fairly quickly, considering their size and cumbersome appearance, finding shelter in the thick undergrowth of the forest or in water. Hunting for meat and hides has substantially reduced their numbers and, more recently, habitat loss has resulted in the conservation watch-listing of all four species; the Brazilian tapir is classified as vulnerable, and Baird's tapir, the mountain tapir, and the Malayan tapir are endangered. According to 2022 study published in the Neotropical Biology and Conservation, the lowland tapir in the Atlantic Forest is at risk of complete extinction as a result of anthropogenic pressures, in particular hunting, deforestation and population isolation.

== Evolution and natural history ==
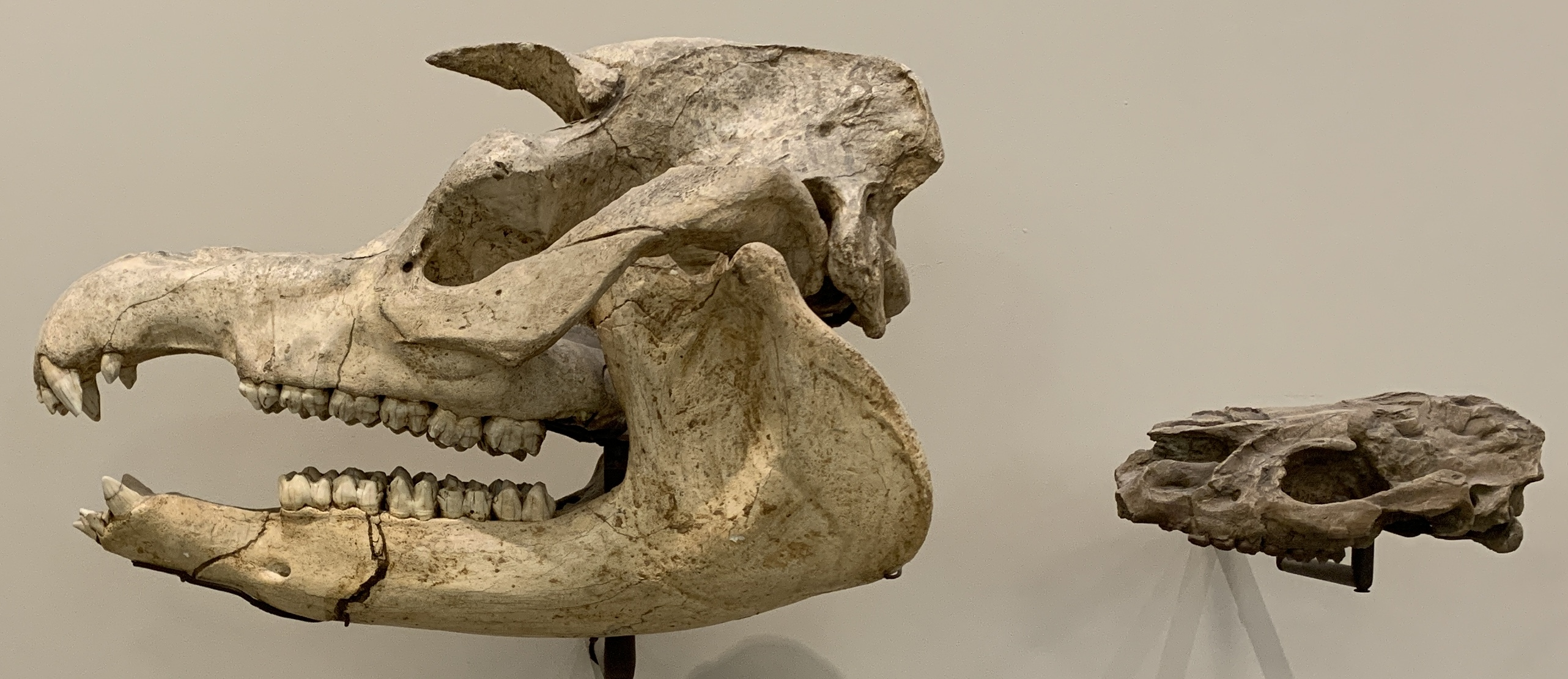
Tapirus augustus skull compared to a Protapirus simplex skull

Tapirs originated from the "tapiroids", a group of primitive perissodactyls that inhabited North America and Asia during the Eocene epoch, with tapirs probably originating from the family Helaletidae. The oldest known members of the family Tapiridae such as Protapirus are known from the Early Oligocene of Europe. The oldest representatives of the modern genus Tapirus appeared in Europe during the Mid-Miocene, with Tapirus dispersing into Asia and North America by the late Miocene. The last species of tapir native to Europe, Tapirus arvernensis, became extinct around the end of the Pliocene, approximately 2.6 million years ago. Tapirs dispersed into South America during Pleistocene as part of the Great American Biotic Interchange with their oldest records on the continent dating to around 2.6-1 million years ago.

Approximate divergence times based on a 2013 analysis of mtDNA sequences are 0.5 Ma for T. kabomani and the T. terrestris–T. pinchaque clade, 5 Ma for T. bairdii and the three South American tapirs, and 9 Ma for the branching of T. indicus. T. pinchaque arises from within a paraphyletic complex of T. terrestris populations.

- Tapirus
  - T. indicus (Malayan tapir)
  - - - - - T. terrestris (South American tapir, Ecuador cluster)
          - T. pinchaque (mountain tapir)
          - T. terrestris (South American tapir, other clusters)
      - - T. bairdii (Baird's tapir)

== Genetics ==
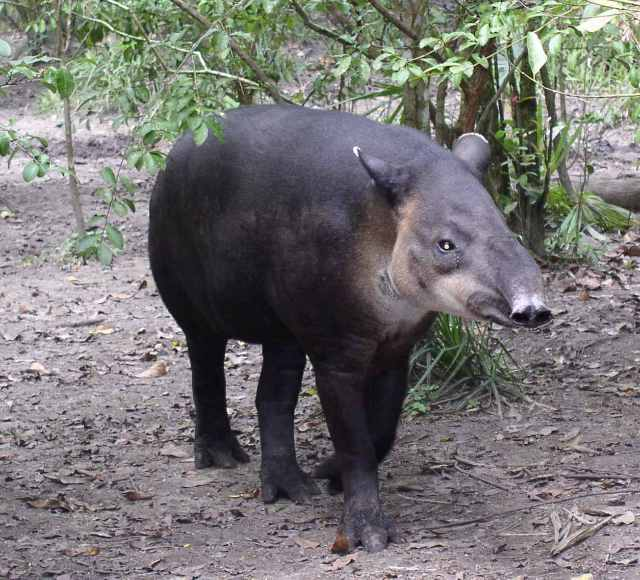
Baird's tapir

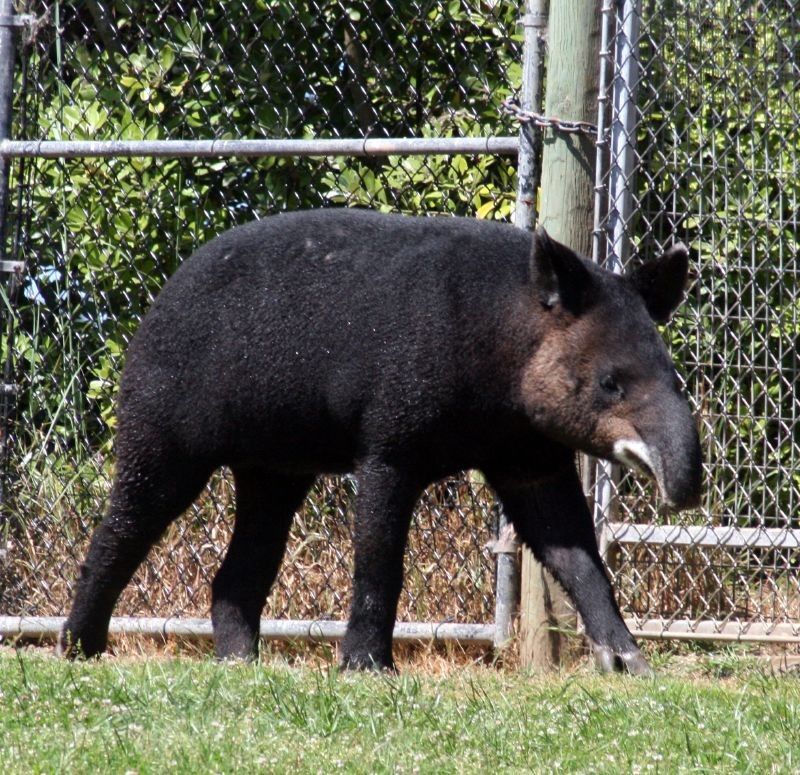
A mountain tapir, the woolliest and most threatened species of tapir

The species of tapir have the following chromosomal numbers:

Malayan tapir, T. indicus	2n = 52
Mountain tapir, T. pinchaque	2n = 76
Baird's tapir, T. bairdii	2n = 80
South American tapir, T. terrestris	2n = 80

The Malayan tapir, the species most isolated geographically and genetically, has a significantly smaller number of chromosomes and has been found to share fewer homologies with the three types of American tapirs. A number of conserved autosomes (13 between karyotypes of Baird's tapir and the South American tapir, and 15 between Baird's and the mountain tapir) have also been found in the American species that are not found in the Asian animal. However, geographic proximity is not an absolute predictor of genetic similarity; for instance, G-banded preparations have revealed Malayan, Baird's and South American tapirs have identical X chromosomes, while mountain tapirs are separated by a heterochromatic addition/deletion.

Lack of genetic diversity in tapir populations has become a major source of concern for conservationists. Habitat loss has isolated already small populations of wild tapirs, putting each group in greater danger of dying out completely. Even in zoos, genetic diversity is limited; all captive mountain tapirs, for example, are descended from only two founder individuals.

Hybrids of Baird's and the South American tapirs were bred at the San Francisco Zoo around 1969 and later produced a backcross second generation.

== Conservation ==
A number of conservation projects have been started around the world. The Tapir Specialist Group, a unit of the IUCN Species Survival Commission, strives to conserve biological diversity by stimulating, developing, and conducting practical programs to study, save, restore, and manage the four species of tapir and their remaining habitats in Central and South America and Southeast Asia.

The Baird's Tapir Project of Costa Rica, begun in 1994, is the longest ongoing tapir project in the world. It involves placing radio collars on tapirs in Costa Rica's Corcovado National Park to study their social systems and habitat preferences.

The Lowland Lowland Tapir Conservation Initiative is a conservation and research organization founded by Patrícia Medici, focused on tapir conservation in Brazil.

== Attacks on humans ==
Tapirs are generally shy, but when scared they can defend themselves with their very powerful jaws. Frank Buck wrote about an attack by a tapir in 1926, which he described in his book, Bring 'Em Back Alive. In 1998, a zookeeper in Oklahoma City was mauled and had an arm severed after opening the door to a female Malayan tapir's enclosure to push food inside (the tapir's two-month-old baby also occupied the cage at the time). In 2006, Carlos Manuel Rodriguez Echandi (who was then the Costa Rican Environmental Minister) became lost in the Corcovado National Park and was found by a search party with a "nasty bite" from a wild tapir. In 2013, a two-year-old girl suffered stomach and arm injuries after being mauled by a South American tapir in Dublin Zoo during a supervised experience in the tapir enclosure. Dublin Zoo pleaded guilty to breaching health and safety regulations and was ordered to pay €5,000 to charity.

However, such examples are rare; for the most part, tapirs are likely to avoid confrontation in favour of running from predators, hiding, or if possible, submerging themselves in nearby water until a threat is gone.

== Culture ==
Tapirs feature in the folklore of several cultures around the world. In Japan, tapirs are associated with the mythological Baku, believed to ward off nightmares. In South America, tapirs are associated with the creation of the earth.
