= Tapiravus =

Scientific classification
- Domain: Eukaryota
- Kingdom: Animalia
- Phylum: Chordata
- Class: Mammalia
- Order: Perissodactyla
- Family: Tapiridae
- Genus: †Tapiravus; Marsh 1877

Species
- Tapiravus rarus; Tapiravus validus

Extinct family of mammals

Tapiravus is an extinct genus of herbivorous mammals that were related to tapirs of today.
