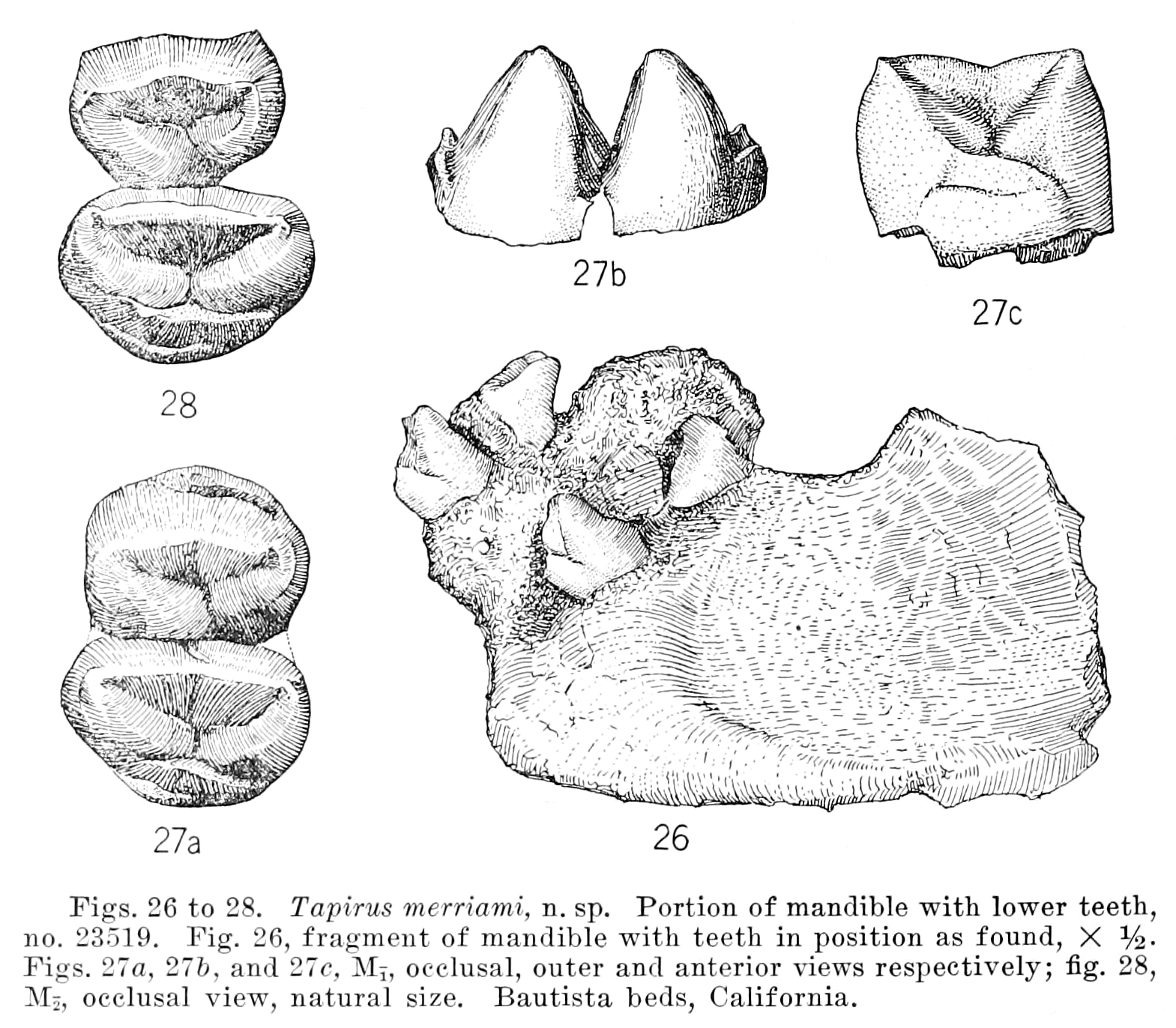

Scientific classification
- Kingdom: Animalia
- Phylum: Chordata
- Class: Mammalia
- Order: Perissodactyla
- Family: Tapiridae
- Genus: Tapirus
- Species: †T. merriami

Binomial name
- †Tapirus merriami Frick, 1921

= Tapirus merriami =

Tapirus merriami Temporal range: 2.8–0.012 Ma Middle-Late Pleistocene

Extinct species of tapir

Tapirus merriami, commonly called Merriam's tapir, is an extinct species of tapir which inhabited North America during the Pleistocene.

== Early history ==
Tapirs have a long history on the North American continent. Fossils of ancient tapirs in North America can be dated back to 50 million-year-old Eocene rocks on Ellesmere Island, Canada, which was then a temperate climate. By 13 million years before present, tapirs very much like extant tapirs existed in Southern California.

During the Pleistocene epoch, four species of tapir are known to have inhabited North America. Along with T. merriami, Tapirus californicus also lived in California, Tapirus veroensis was found in Florida, Georgia, Kansas, Missouri and Tennessee, and Tapirus copei was found from Pennsylvania to Florida.

First discovered and described in 1921 by American vertebrate paleontologist Childs Frick, T. merriami lived at the same time, and perhaps many of the same locations, as T. californicus, but is believed to have preferred more inland habitats of southern California and Arizona. Like T. californicus and all living tapirs, it is believed to have been a relatively solitary species. Of the four known Pleistocene-era tapirs found on the North American continent, T. merriami was the largest. T. merriami was a stout-bodied herbivore with short legs, a large, tapering head, and a short, muscular proboscis adept at stripping leaves from shrubs.
