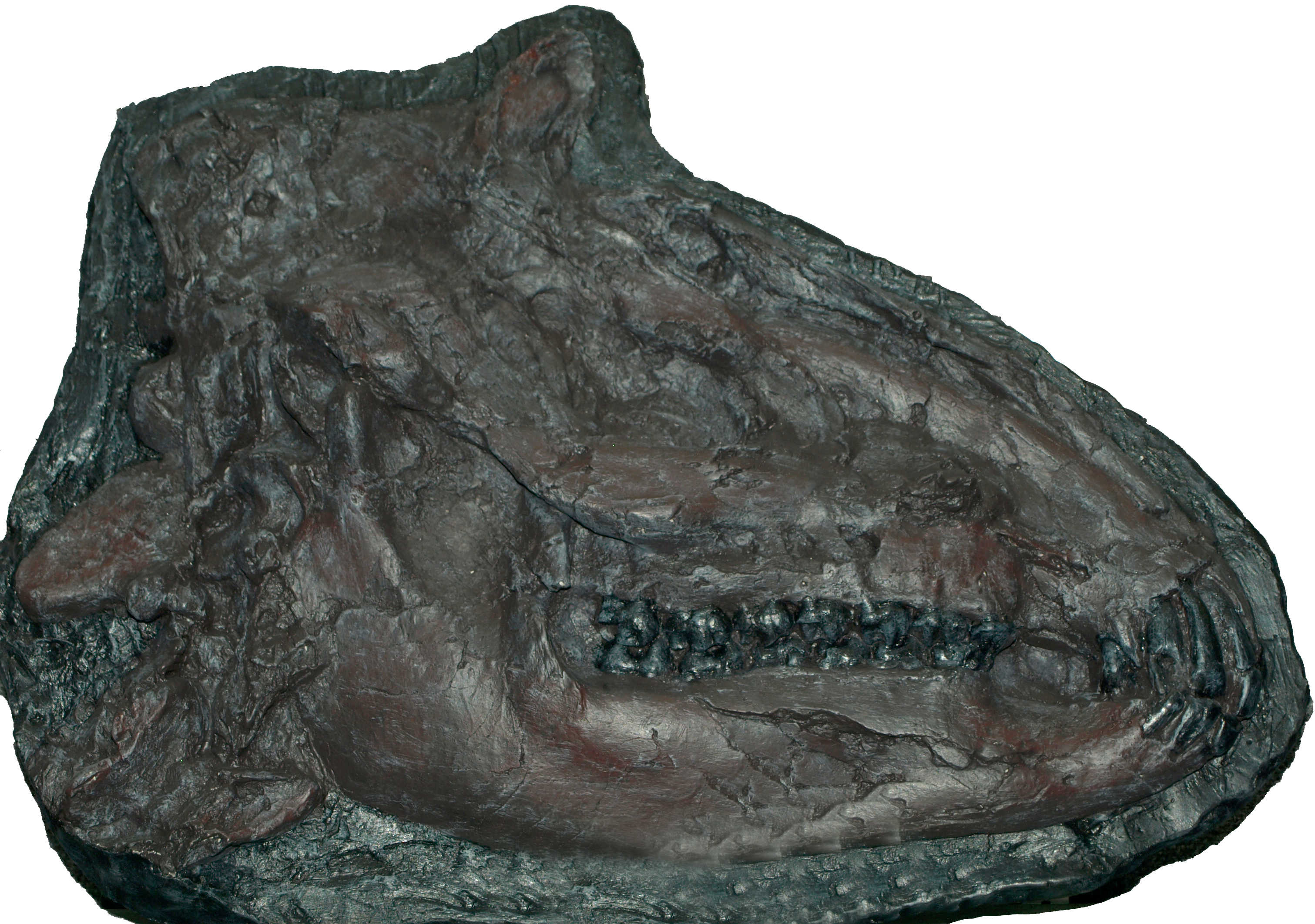
- Plesiotapirus yagii skull

Scientific classification
- Domain: Eukaryota
- Kingdom: Animalia
- Phylum: Chordata
- Class: Mammalia
- Order: Perissodactyla
- Family: Tapiridae
- Genus: †Plesiotapirus; Qiu, Yan & Sun, 1991
- Species: †P. yagii

Binomial name
- †Plesiotapirus yagii Matsumoto, 1921

= Plesiotapirus =

Plesiotapirus Temporal range: Early Miocene

Extinct genus of tapir

Plesiotapirus is an extinct genus of tapir from the Miocene of Asia. A single species is usually considered valid, Plesiotapirus yagii.

It was first described in 1921 based on fragmentary dental remains found in Japan. Fossils of P. yagii were originally classified under the defunct genus Palaeotapirus. Better material, including a complete skull, were found in China and in 1991 the genus Plesiotapirus was erected.
