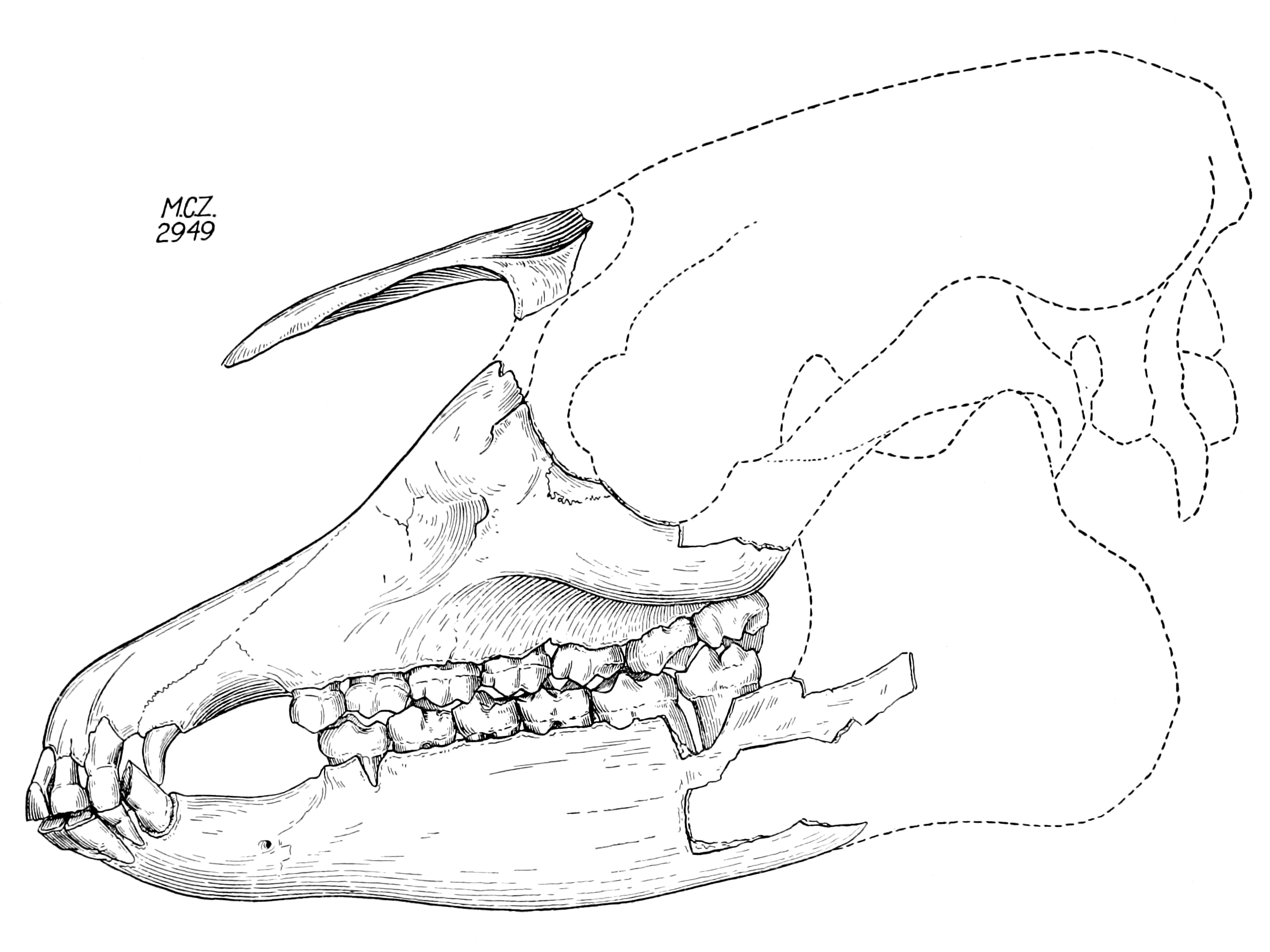
- Skull diagram
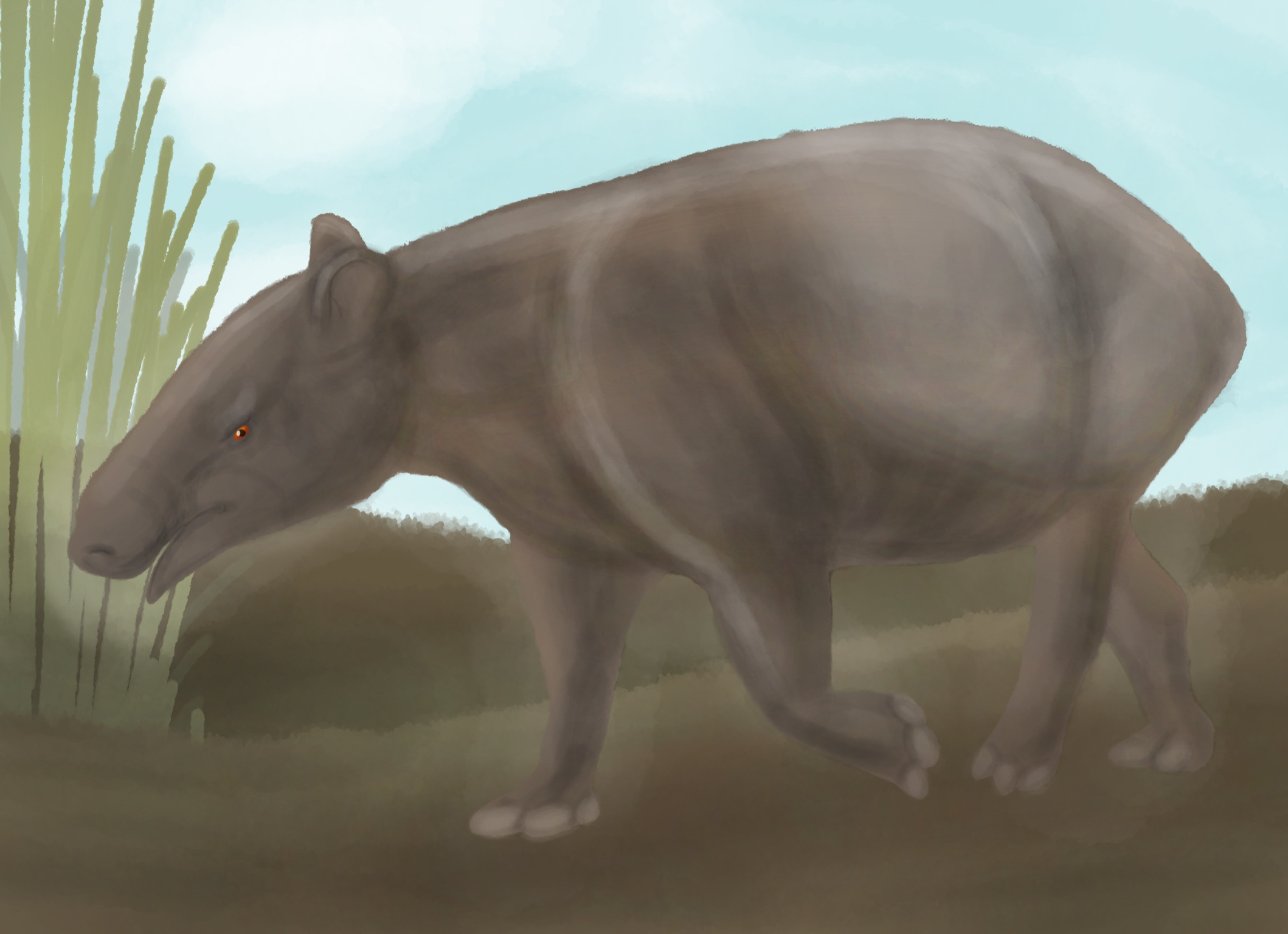
- Life reconstruction

Scientific classification
- Kingdom: Animalia
- Phylum: Chordata
- Class: Mammalia
- Order: Perissodactyla
- Family: Tapiridae
- Genus: †Miotapirus; Schlaikjer, 1937
- Species: †M. harrisonensis

Binomial name
- †Miotapirus harrisonensis Schlaikjer, 1937

= Miotapirus =

Miotapirus Temporal range: Early Miocene

Extinct genus of mammal

Miotapirus harrisonensis is an extinct species of tapir lived during the early Miocene Epoch some 20 million years ago in North America.

Physically, Miotapirus was virtually identical to its modern relatives; with a length of 2 m (6 ft 8 in) it was approximately the same size as well. Most likely it was also nocturnal and very adaptable.
