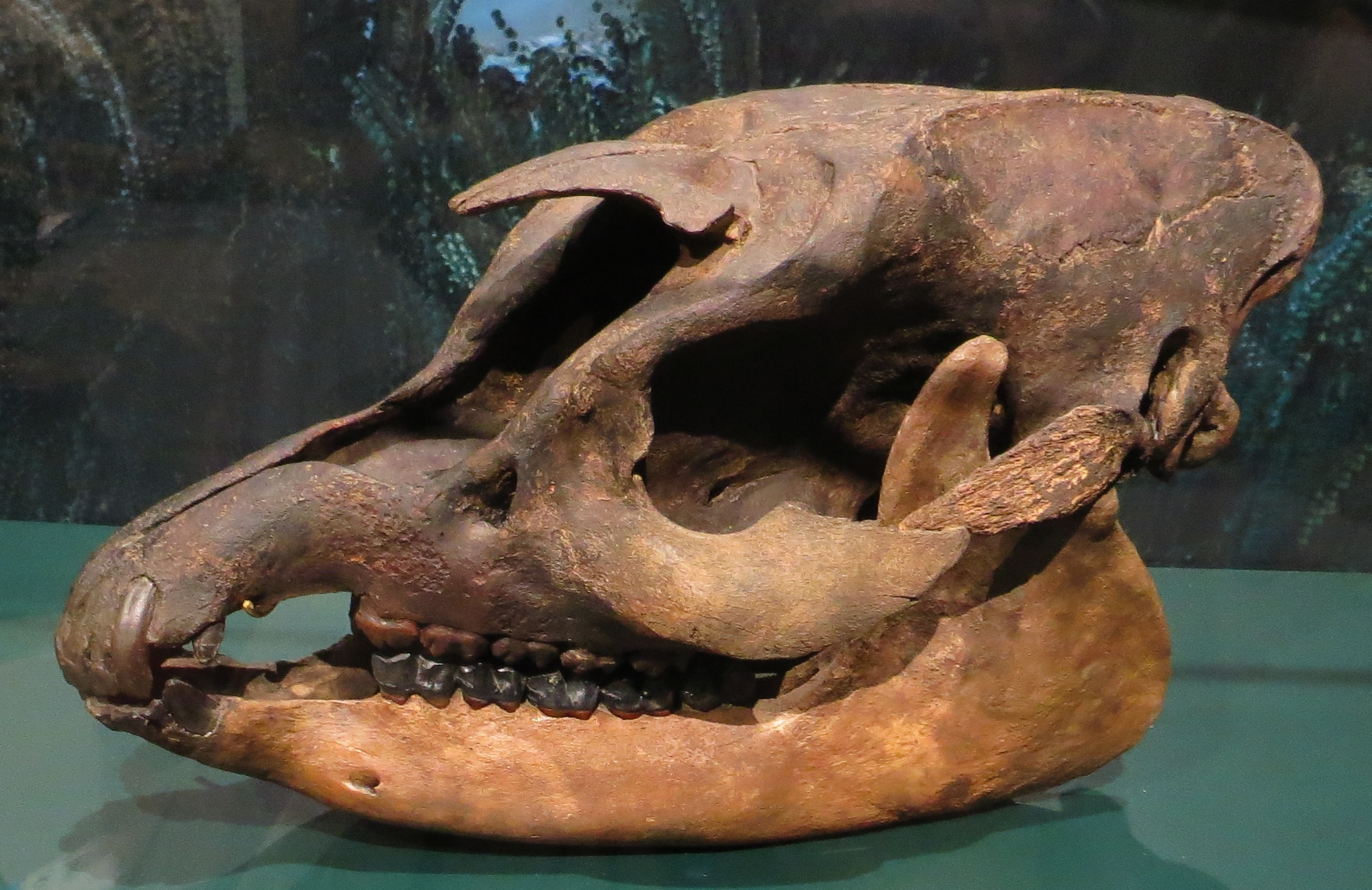
- A skull held at the Natural History Museum in Karlsruhe, Germany

Scientific classification
- Kingdom: Animalia
- Phylum: Chordata
- Class: Mammalia
- Order: Perissodactyla
- Family: Tapiridae
- Genus: Tapirus
- Species: †T. haysii

Binomial name
- †Tapirus haysii Leidy 1859

Synonyms
- Tapirus copei

= Tapirus haysii =

Tapirus haysii Temporal range: 2.5–1 Ma Early Pleistocene–Middle Pleistocene

Extinct species of mammal

Tapirus haysii is an extinct species of tapir that inhabited North America during the early to middle Pleistocene Epoch (~2.5–1 Ma). These fossil remains of two juvenile T. haysii were collected in Hillsborough County, Florida on 31 August 1963. It was classified as the second largest North American tapir; the first being T. merriami. Its mean estimated body mass is estimated at 280 kilograms (620 lb).

== Taxonomy ==
Tapirus copei is a junior synonym. Taprirus haysii is placed in the subgenus Helicotapirus, which also includes Tapirus veroensis and Tapirus lundeliusi.
