= Tapirus lundeliusi =

Tapirus lundeliusi Temporal range: 2.5–1.6 Ma Early Pleistocene

Scientific classification
- Kingdom: Animalia
- Phylum: Chordata
- Class: Mammalia
- Infraclass: Placentalia
- Order: Perissodactyla
- Family: Tapiridae
- Genus: Tapirus
- Species: †T. lundeliusi

Binomial name
- †Tapirus lundeliusi Hulbert, 2010

Extinct species of tapir

Tapirus lundeliusi is an extinct species of tapir that lived in Florida in the early Pleistocene. It was similar in size and shape to the still-living mountain tapir (T. pinchaque), with an estimated weight of 203 kg

== Taxonomy ==
Taprirus haysii is placed in the subgenus Helicotapirus, which also includes Tapirus veroensis and Tapirus haysii.
