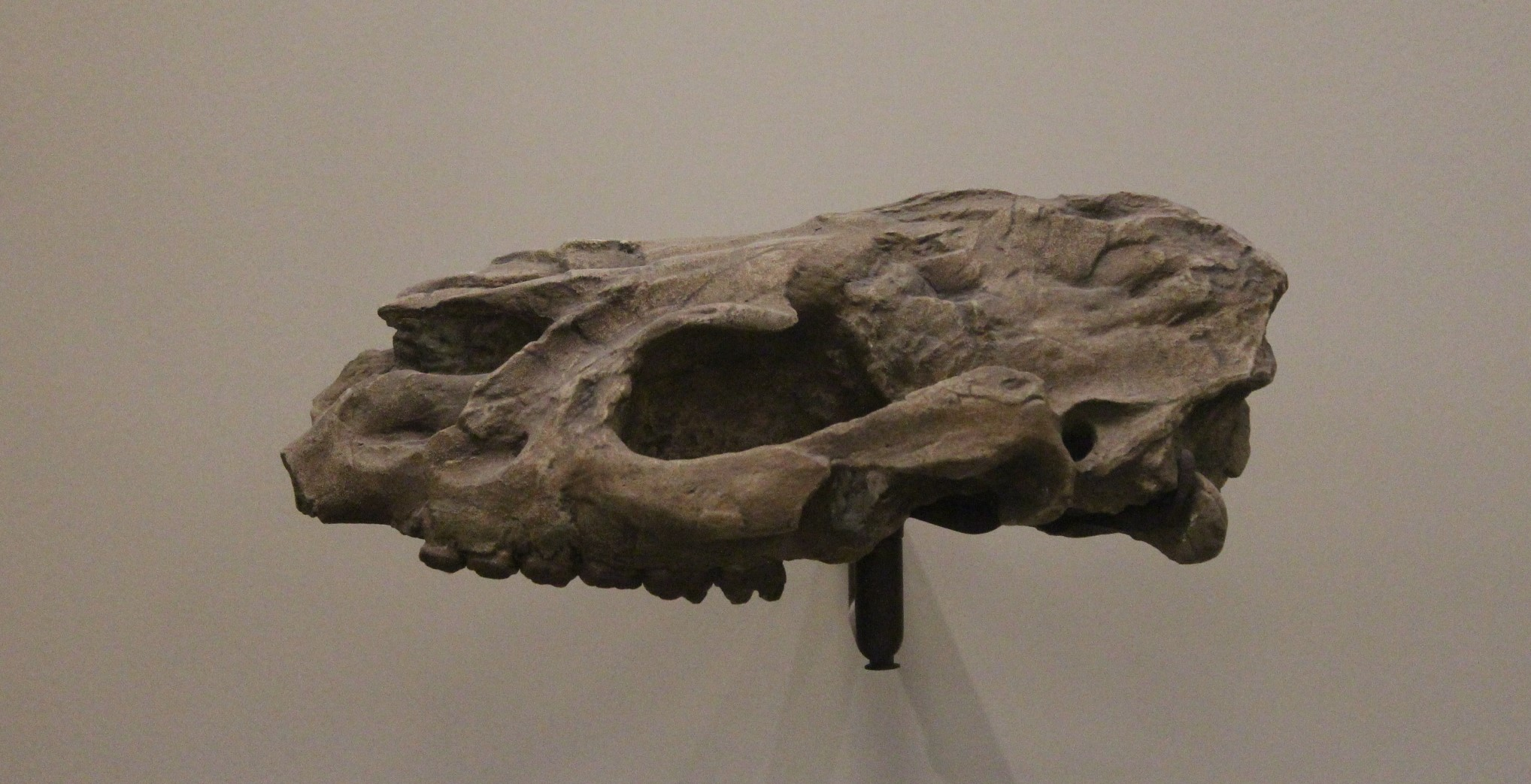
- Protapirus simplex skull from South Dakota. At the AMNH.
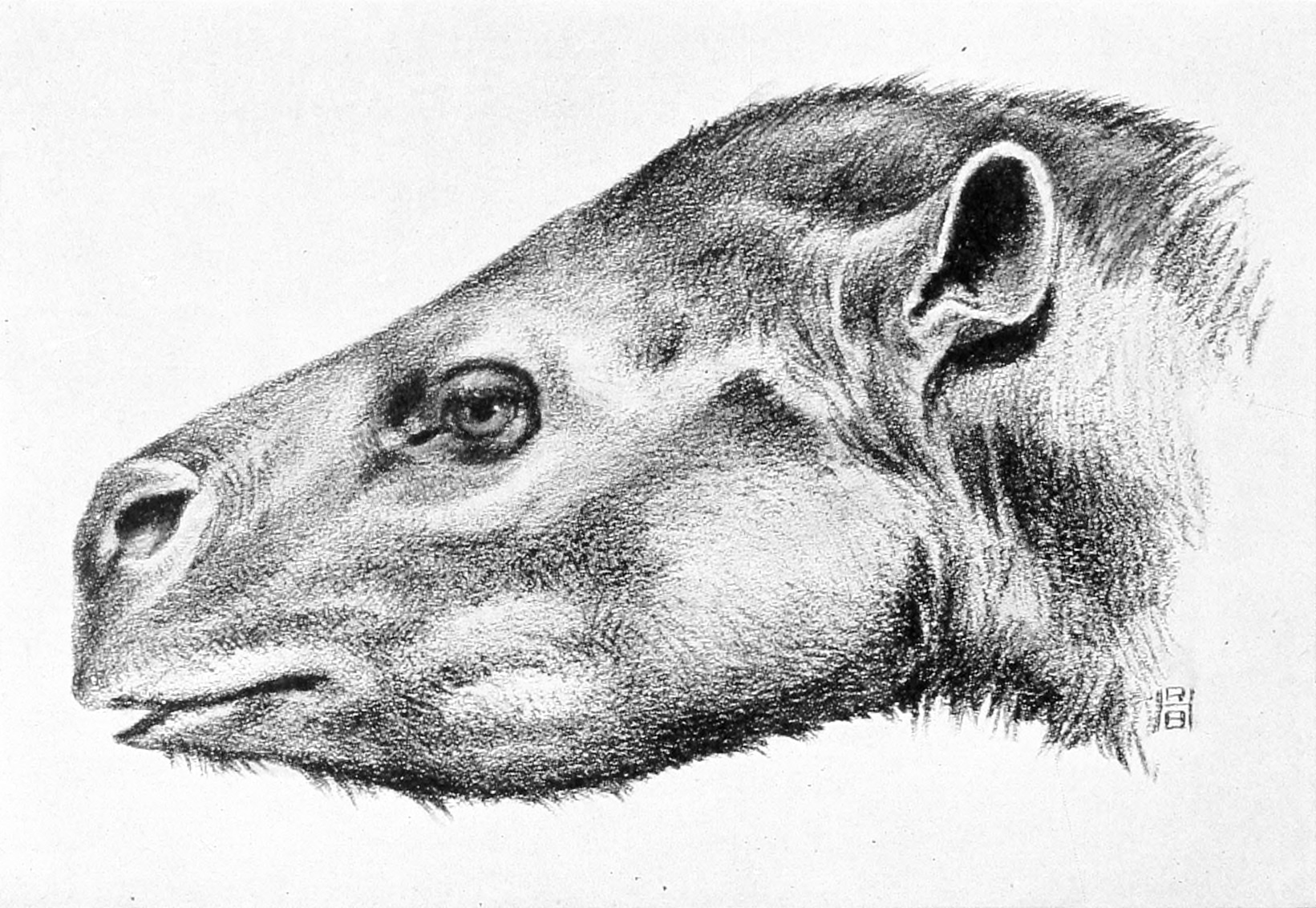
- 1913 illustration of P. simplex, depicted without a trunk.

Scientific classification
- Kingdom: Animalia
- Phylum: Chordata
- Class: Mammalia
- Order: Perissodactyla
- Family: Tapiridae
- Genus: †Protapirus; Filhol, 1877

Type species
- †Protapirus priscus Filhol, 1874

Species
- P. aginensis; P. bavaricus; P. cetinensis; P. douvillei; P. gromovae; P. obliquidens (syn. Tanyops undans); P. priscus; P. simplex (syn. P. validus)

= Protapirus =

Protapirus Temporal range: 33.9–20.6 Ma Early Oligocene-Early Miocene

Extinct genus of mammals

Protapirus (Latin: "before" (pro), + Brazilian Indian: "tapir" (tapira)) is an extinct genus of tapir known from the Oligocene and Miocene of North America and Eurasia.

== Taxonomy ==
The type species is Protapirus priscus from the Late Oligocene of Quercy, France. Protapirus is often considered the earliest true tapir, or at least a tapiroid that is the direct ancestor of the true tapir family.

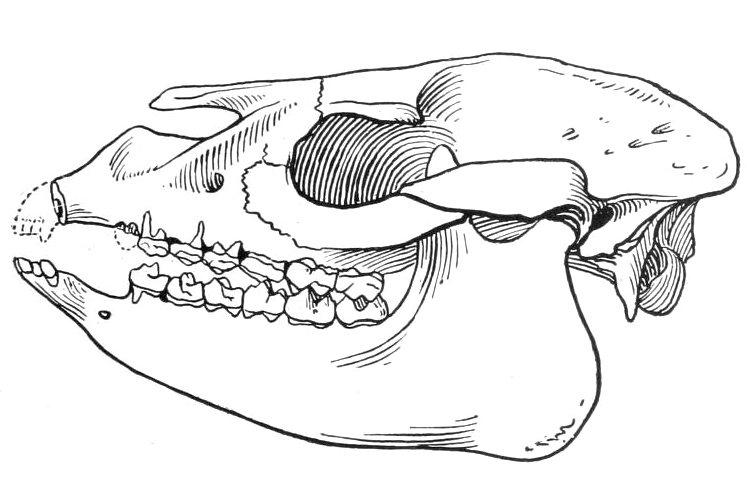
P. simplex skull illustration.

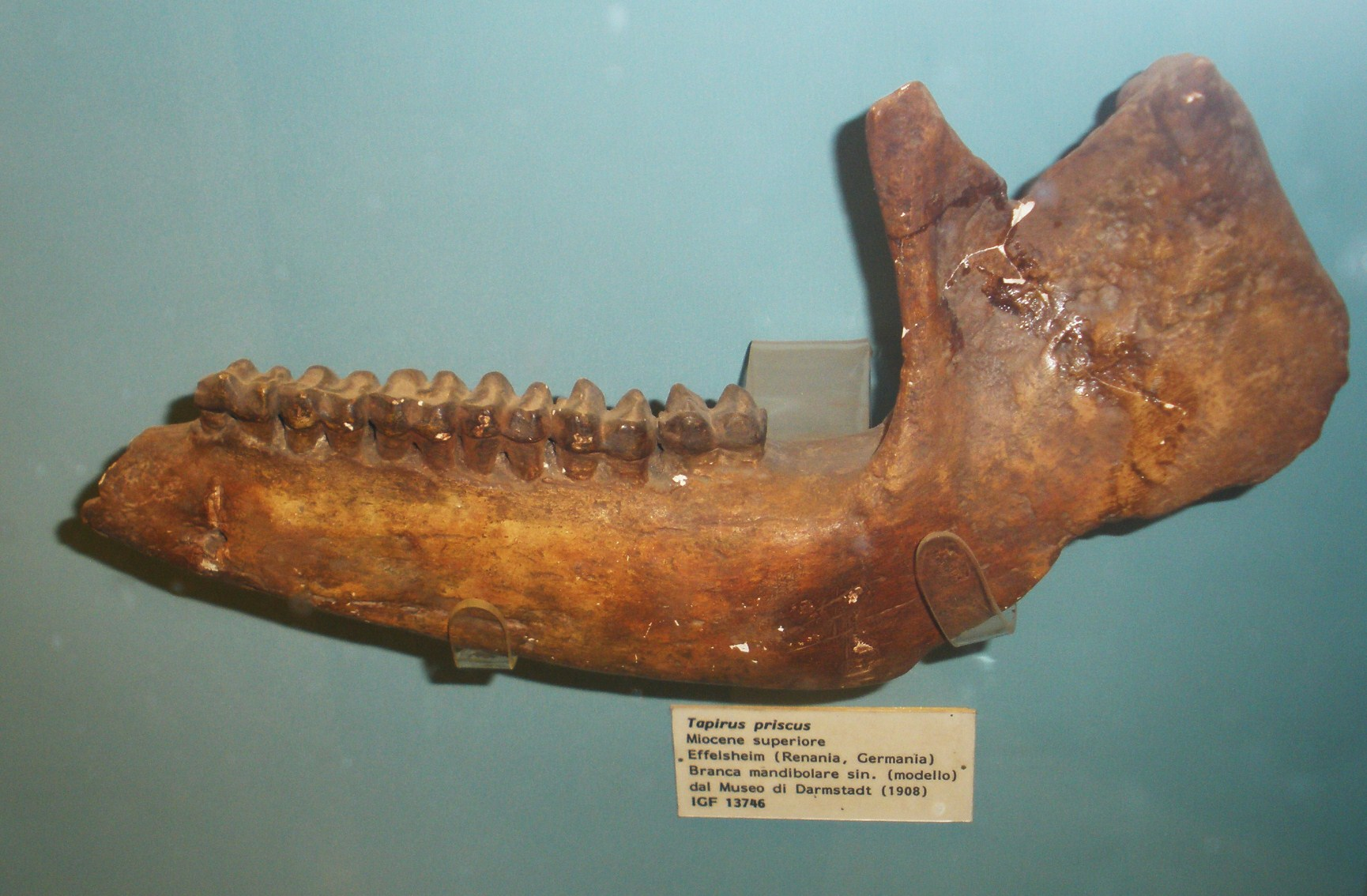
Mandible of Protapirus priscus.

== Distribution and history ==
The oldest species is the North American P. simplex from the White River Formation. A later North American species is P. obliquidens From North America, the genus spread into Eurasia during the Oligocene, with five species known from the Oligocene and Miocene of Europe and a single species (P. gromovae) from Kazakhstan.

== Description ==
They were of similar size to modern tapirs, but had more primitive features, such as premolars that were less molariform in shape. They also bore canine tusks, and the substitution of the external upper incisor for the canines is not present. In comparison to more primitive tapiroids, Protapirus had retracted nasal region which may indicate the presence of a trunk. However, the nasals were not as shortened as in modern tapirs, so the proboscis would have likely been less prominent.
